= Metropolitanate of Gothia =

Medieval Christian territorial division

See Archdiocese of the Goths and the Northlands for the 1994 establishment in Sweden.

The Metropolitanate of Gothia (also of Gothia and Caffa), also known as the Eparchy of Gothia or Metropolitanate of Doros, was a metropolitan diocese of the Patriarchate of Constantinople in the Middle Ages.

The 9th-century Metropolitanate of Doros was centered in the Crimea, but it seems to have had dioceses further afield, as far east as the Caspian coast, but they were probably short-lived, as the Khazars converted to Judaism. From the 13th century until the Ottoman conquest in 1475, the Metropolitanate of Gothia was within the Principality of Theodoro (known in Greek as Γοτθία, Gothia). In 1779, it was transferred to the Russian Orthodox Church and disestablished a few years later.

== Early history ==
The Goths came into contact with Christianity from the late 3rd century, and were Christianized in the course of the 4th century. Theophilus, the first known bishop of the Goths, defended the Trinitarian and Orthodox Christological position against the Arians at the First Ecumenical Council in Nicea 325, and signed the Nicene Creed. The evidence suggests that Theophilus was the bishop of a territorial see in area of Crimea. The bishops of Crimean Gothia were Nicene (whereas most of the Goths were Arians) and were appointed by the patriarch of Constantinople.

The Crimean Goths themselves were a remnant of the migration-era Gothic population of Oium. The Byzantine Metropolitanate, however, was limited to a remnant of the Roman Crimea (the Bosporan Kingdom), consisting only of the southeastern coastal area of the peninsula. The Crimean Goths from about 370 were thus wedged between the Hunnic Empire (and later Khazaria) to the north and the Roman (Byzantine) territory to the southeast.

The "Archdiocese of the Goths" existed autonomously during the 5th to 9th centuries, but from the 5th century there seems to have been a close relation to the Patriarchate of Constantinople. John Chrysostomos consecrated Unila (d. 404) as bishop of the Archdiocese of the Goths. John Chrysostomos preached to the Goths with aid of interpreter in the Goths' church in Constantinople, which had priests, deacons and readers whom were Goths and read, preached and sang in the Gothic language. It was he who appointed the successor of Bishop Unila to the seat of ruling bishop over the Archdiocese of the Goths, and acted as the protector and benefactor of the Archdiocese at this period.

In its disputed 28th Canon, the Council of Chalcedon in 451 recognized an expansion of the boundaries of the Patriarchate of Constantinople and of its authority over bishops of dioceses "among the barbarians", which has been variously interpreted as referring either to areas outside the Byzantine Empire or to non-Greeks.

== Byzantine metropolitanate ==
John of Gothia (John of Partenit) was a Metropolitan bishop of Doros. During the period of Byzantine Iconoclasm, John reputedly gathered Orthodox refugees from Constantinople in the Crimea. A bishop of Gothia attended the iconoclastic Council of Hieria in 754, but his flock soon expelled him and elected John in his place. John overthrew and expelled the Khazars from Gothia 787; the Khazars however managed to retake the city in less than a year, and John was imprisoned in Phoulloi. He later managed to escape, and sought refuge in Amastris in the Byzantine Empire, where he died in 791. His remains were brought home to a church on the Ayu-Dag mountain, where a memorial to him has been built. John's Vita was composed within a generation or so of his death, in the early 9th century.

The Gothic church was incorporated into the Patriarchate of Constantinople at some point between the late 8th and the late 9th century. It was the first diocese established outside the historical boundaries of the Roman Empire (just before the Metropolitanates of Alania and of Rus'). Its existence is documented in a list of Byzantine dioceses in a Paris manuscript, dated to the 14th century, published by Carl de Boor in 1891. Its continued existence is a matter of doubt, as there are practically no records on it, and it may have been little more than a missionary project with the aim of evangelizing the Khazars, or essentially a diocese in partibus infidelium. The archidiocese with its seat at Doros comprised seven dioceses (most of which correspond to unknown or uncertain locations).

The first extant medieval record which confirms that the Gothic language was still spoken in "Gothia" is the Vita of Saint Cyril, Apostle to the Slavs (also known as Constantine the Philosopher) who went to Crimea to preach the gospel to the Khazars in c. 850. He lists "Goths" as people who read and praised the Christian God "in their own language". Medieval "Gothia" was still far from uniformly Gothic-speaking. Many "Crimean Goths" were Greek speakers and many non-Gothic Byzantine citizens were settled in the region called "Gothia" by the government in Constantinople. The official language of the Principality of Theodoro was Greek, but the Gothic language remained in use in private homes at least until the 18th century (Ogier Ghiselin de Busbecq in the 16th century reported having had a conversation with two Goths in Constantinople, and left a Gothic-Latin glossary with about a hundred Gothic words), but it is unknown for how long the Gothic language survived as liturgical language in the Crimean Gothic church.

Historical records grow more reliable only in the 13th century, with the emergence of the Principality of Theodoro, or Gothia. From 1283, the diocese was known as the "Metropolitanate of Gothia and Kaphas (Caffa)", whose direct jurisdiction was at Marcopia (modern Mangup).

Gothia became tributary to the Mongols in the 1220s, but remained nominally independent. Caffa was established as a trading port by the Genoese, with the consent of the Mongols, in 1266. The Genoese during the 14th century came to control much of the southwestern coast of the Crimea. From 1287, Genoese arch-rival Venice also established trading posts on the Black Sea coast. Wedged between the Mongols in the steppe and the Italian powers on the coast, the Crimean Goths became limited to the Crimean hinterland and essentially pass out of the historical record. Timur Lenk devastated Doros in 1395, but Gothia remained nominally independent for another 80 years, until it finally fell to the Ottoman Empire in 1475.

== Ottoman conquests and disestablishment ==
The Crimea fell to the Ottoman Empire in 1475 as the vassal-state known as the Crimean Khanate. The Crimean Goths managed to maintain their ethnic identity under Turkic rule during the 16th and 17th centuries, and in marginalized form even until the 18th century. The only surviving report of Gothic Christians in the Crimea is that of Joseph-Juste Scaliger who in 1606 claimed that the Goths of Crimea read both the Old and New Testaments "in the letters of Wulfila's alphabet".

The Metropolitanate of Gothia and Kaphas continued to exist in partibus infidelium until 1778.

Archbishop Gedeon resided at Mariampol, a suburb of Bahcesaray, capital of the khanate. For reasons unknown, he was sent by Patriarch Cyril V of Constantinople into exile at Varlaam Monastery for ten years from 1750 to 1760. In 1759, the Ottoman sultan Mustafa III issued a firman confirming the metropolitan's authority "over the Christians dwelling in Caffa, Mankup, Balaclava and Azov" in accordance with custom. In June 1778, Metropolitan Ignatios took the initiative to move the Christians of the khanate into Russia. This move had support within Russia, eventually even from Empress Catherine the Great. Ignatios founded the city of Mariupol. He retained his title until his death, but after him no further metropolitans of Gothia were appointed.

== List of bishops and metropolitans ==
- Theophilus (fl. 325)
- Unila (d. 404)
- Unnamed (fl. c. 404)
- Unnamed (fl. 548)
- Unnamed (fl. 753–54)
- John (c.755–791)
- Unnamed (fl. 1066–1067)
- Constantine (fl. 1147)
- John (d. 1166)
- Constantine (fl. 1166–1170)
- Arsenius (13th century)
- Sophronius (fl. 1292)
- Theodosius (fl. 1385)
- Antonius (1386–1389)
- John Holobolos (fl. 1399, d. 1410)
- Damianus (fl. 1427)
- Constantius (fl. 1587)
- Seraphimus (fl. 1635)
- Anthymus (1639–1652)
- Daniel (1625)
- David (1652–1673)
- Methodius (fl. 1673)
- Neophytos (fl. 1680)
- Makarios (fl. 1707)
- Parthenios (fl. 1710–1721)
- Gedeon (fl. 1725–1769)
- Ignatios (1771–1786)

== Literature ==
- Karidis, Vyron (1986). "The Mariupol Greeks: Tsarist Treatment of an Ethnic Minority ca. 1778–1859". Journal of Modern Hellenism. 3: 57–74.
- Kiminas, Demetrius (2009). The Ecumenical Patriarchate: A History of Its Metropolitanates with Annotated Hierarch Catalogs. Wildside Press LLC. ISBN 9781434458766.
- Mathisen, Ralph W. (1997). "Barbarian Bishops and the Churches 'in Barbaricis Gentibus' During Late Antiquity". Speculum. 72 (3): 664–697. doi:10.2307/3040758. JSTOR 3040758. S2CID 162456476.
- Stearns, MacDonald (1978). Crimean Gothic: Analysis and Etymology of the Corpus. Anma Libri.
- Vasiliev, Alexander A. (1936). The Goths in the Crimea. Cambridge, Massachusetts: The Mediaeval Academy of America.
