= Patristic anthology =

Summary of works of ancient Christian theologians

A patristic anthology or florilegium is a systematic collections of excerpts from the works of the Church Fathers and other ecclesiastical writers of the early period, compiled with a view to serve dogmatic or ethical purposes. These encyclopedic compilations are a characteristic product of the later Byzantine theological school, and form a very considerable branch of the extensive literature of the Greek Catenæ. They frequently embody the only remains of some patristic writings.

== Classification ==
Two classes of Christian florilegia may here be distinguished: the dogmatic and the ascetical, or ethical. The dogmatic florilegia are designed to exhibit the continuous and connected teaching of the Fathers on some specific doctrine. The first impulse to compilations of this nature was given by the Christological controversies that convulsed the Eastern Church during the fifth century. A convenient summary of what the Fathers and most approved theologians had held and taught was wanted. Such a summary, setting forth the views of Nestorius and the mind of the orthodox Fathers, was first laid before the Council of Ephesus, in 431, by Cyril of Alexandria. Summaries of dogmatic utterances were used also at the Council of Chalcedon in 451, and at the Fifth General Council in 553.

== Dogmatic florilegia ==
Only in the seventh century the dogmatic florilegia assumed a fully developed and definite form. At the Sixth General Council, in 680, two of these collections played a very prominent rôle, one, constructed by Macarius, the Patriarch of Antioch, in favour of the Monothelites, and the other, a counter collection presented by the legates of Pope Agatho.

During the Iconoclastic controversy similar collections were produced. Mention is made of one on the cult of relics and images which the Synod of Jerusalem sent to John, Bishop of Gothia, about 760.

The oldest extant, and at the same time most extensive and valuable, of these dogmatic compilations, is the Antiquorum Patrum doctrino de Verbi incarnatione. It is rich in fragments from writings of the Patristic period which are now lost. Of the 977 citations (mainly of a Christological character) which it contains, 751 alone are from the works of the Fathers, representing 93 ecclesiastical writers.

A florilegium somewhat similar to the "Doctrina" is mentioned by Photius in his Bibliotheca, but not a trace of it survives. Another compilation of this kind, entitled Περὶ τῆς ἐξ ἀρχῆς καὶ μέχρι τέλους οἰκονομίας τοῦ θεοῦ, εἰς τὸν ἄνθρωπον ἱστορία ἐπωφελής· καὶ περὶ τῆς χριστιανικῆς πολιτείας, ὅπως συνέστη· καὶ κατὰ πάντων τῶν αἱρετικῶν or simply De Oeconomia Dei covering the whole province of theology in five separate books, is ascribed to the twelfth-century monk Nilus Doxopatres, related to but certainly not identical with the eleventh-century John Doxopatres; the first two books, treating respectively of Adam and Christ, are all that remain. A number of other dogmatic florilegia are still extant in manuscript form. The authors of most of them are unknown.

== Ascetical florilegia ==
The ascetical florilegia are collections of moral sentences and excerpts drawn partly from the Scriptures and partly from the Fathers, on such topics as virtues and vices, duties and exercises of a religious life, faith, discipline, etc. They are not so numerous as the dogmatic florilegia, and apparently were all compiled before the tenth century. Their material, as a rule, is gathered indiscriminately from various authorities, though in some instances it is furnished by only a single writer, a distinct preference being then shown for the works of the more illustrious Fathers, Basil the Great, Gregory of Nazianzus, and John Chrysostom. An extensive Christian florilegium of the sixth century, entitled tà ‘ierá (Sacred Things), is probably the earliest of these anthologies. The work consisted originally of three books, the first of which treated of God, the second of man, and the third of the virtues and vices. In the course of time it underwent contraction into one book, its material was recast and arranged in alphabetical order under títloi, or sections, its name changed to tà ‘ierà parállela, Sacra Parallela (from the fact that in the third book a virtue and a vice were regularly contrasted or paralleled), and its authorship widely ascribed to St. John Damascene. That the Damascene was really the compiler of the "Sacra Parallela", and that he used as his principal source the "Capita theologica", a florilegium of Maximus Confessor, has been maintained firmly (against Friedrich Loofs, Paul Wendland, and Jonas Cohn) by Karl Holl. Though tà ‘ierá is no longer extant in its original form, considerable portions of the first two books have come down to us in manuscript, and parts of the third are preserved in "The Bee" (Melissa) of Antonius, a Greek monk of the eleventh century. Of the Sacra Parallela there are several recensions, one of which is given in Migne. Other extant ascetical florilegia still remain unedited. As in the case of the dogmatic florilegia, most of them are anonymous.
