= John of Gothia =

Crimean Gothic metropolitan bishop

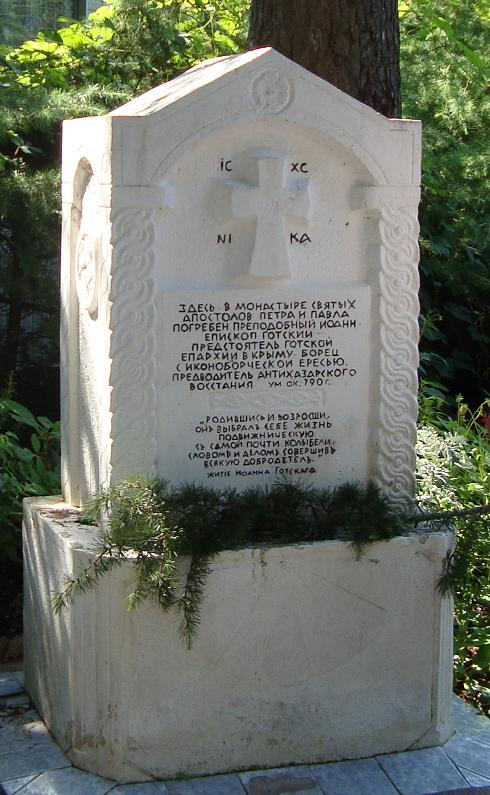
- Memorial stone to John of Gothia Ayu-Dag mountain, Partenit, Crimea

Bishop of Doros
- Born: Partenit, Crimea (probably then under Eastern Roman Empire)
- Died: 791 AD; Amastris, Eastern Roman Empire (now in Turkey)
- Venerated in: Eastern Orthodox Church
- Feast: 26 June
- Patronage: Goths, Crimea, historians, monks

John of Gothia (Greek: ᾿Ιωάννης ἐπίσκοπος τῆς Γοτθίας, Iōánnēs epískopos tēs Gotthiás (Note: Literally translated as "John, bishop to the Goths".); died c. 791 AD) was a Crimean Gothic metropolitan bishop of Doros, and rebel leader who overthrew and briefly expelled the Khazars from Gothia in 787. He was canonized as an Eastern Orthodox saint.

John of Gothia was born to a Crimean Gothic family, the son of Leon and Fotina, in Partenit, Crimea, where he grew up to become a bishop. John went on a pilgrimage to Jerusalem and stayed there for three years. From there he became a bishop in Georgia in 758 until he returned to Gothia and became metropolitan bishop of Doros.

In 787 John led a revolt against Khazar domination of Gothia. The Khazar garrison and Tudun were expelled from Doros, and the rebels seized the mountain passes leading into the country. The Khazars however managed to retake the city in less than a year, and John was imprisoned in Phoulloi. He later managed to escape and sought refuge in Amastris in the Byzantine Empire, where he died in 791. His remains were brought home to a church on the Ayu-Dag mountain, Partenit, Crimea, where a memorial to him has been built. John was canonized as a saint by the Eastern Orthodox Church. His memorial day is 26 June.

== See also ==
- Metropolitanate of Gothia
- Nicene Christianity
