= Mangup =

Historic fortress in Crimea near Sevastopol

Mangup Crimean Tatar: Mangup
- Historic settlement
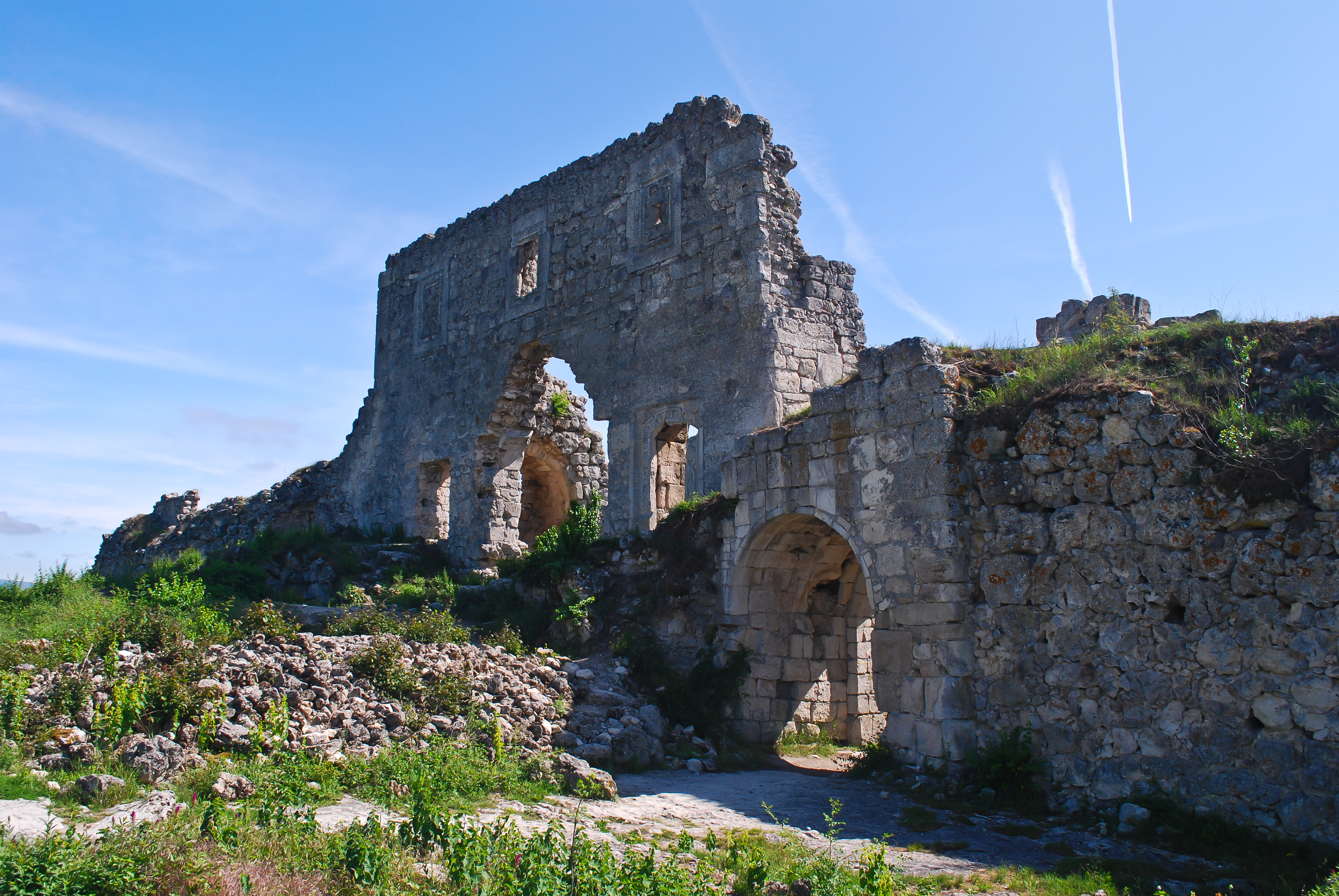
- Ruins of the Gate of the Citadel at Mangup
- Interactive map of Mangup
- Location of Mangup in Crimea
- Coordinates: 44°35′40″N 33°48′28″E
- Region: Crimea
- Raion: Bakhchysarai Raion

Immovable Monument of National Significance of Ukraine
- Official name: Комплекс фортеці і печерного міста “Мангуп-Кале” (Complex of the fortress and cave town of Mangup-Kale)
- Type: Architecture
- Reference no.: 010087

Mangup (Russian: Мангуп; Ukrainian: Мангуп, romanized: Manhup; Crimean Tatar: Mangup) also known as Mangup Kale (kale means "fortress" in Turkish) is a historic fortress in Crimea, located on a plateau about 13 kilometres east of Sevastopol (ancient Chersonesus).

== Names ==
It was known as Dory (Greek: Δόρυ), later Doros (Δόρος), Doras (Δόρας) and finally Theodoro (Θεοδωρώ) by the Byzantines, before being given the Kipchak name Mangup. A 14th-century inscription found in the city called it the "God-guarded fortress of Theodoro" and its citizens Theodorites. Genoese documents referred to the city as Tedoro, Todoro, Theodori, Teodori, Thodori, Tedori, and Todori. These names are derived from the Greek names of the place.

The name Theodoro has survived up to the present day in the name of the village of Ai-Todor (Saint Theodore), which lies south of Mangup.

Silvio Giuseppe Mercati believed that the plural form of the city's name (Theodori, Teodori, Thodori, Tedori, Todori) was because the city was dedicated to the two saints, Theodore Tiron and Theodore Stratelates. However, Alexander Vasiliev (historian) was doubtful about this theory since there was no proof that these two saints were considered protectors of the city.

== History ==
According to the 6th-century Byzantine historian Procopius of Caesarea, the region of Dory or Doros was settled by those Ostrogoths who refused to follow Theodoric the Great in his invasion of Italy in the 490s, marking the beginning of the Crimean Goths and their homeland, Gothia. Archaeological excavations have demonstrated the establishment of Christian basilicas, fortifications and cave settlements (alongside Mangup also at Eski Kermen etc.) during the 6th century. By the late 7th or early 8th century, a new bishopric, the Metropolitanate of Doros, was established in the region. Crimean Gothia was conquered by the Khazars in the early 8th century, and later in the 8th century was the center of an unsuccessful Gothic revolt against Khazaria led by Bishop John of Gothia.

As a result of the Khazar conquest, the name Dory/Doros disappeared after the 9th century and was replaced by Mangup, first attested ca. 960, although the early medieval name may have survived in a corrupted form in the name of the Principality of Theodoro, which existed in the area in the late Middle Ages. In the mid-10th century, the Crimean Goths were Khazar vassals, before falling under the influence of competing powers: the Kievan Rus and the Kipchak tribal confederacy. The town was severely damaged by an earthquake in the 11th century, yet managed to maintain autonomy during the Mongol conquest of Crimea but was compelled to pay tribute to the Great Khan.

In ca. 1223, the towns of Gothia may have been tributary to the Empire of Trebizond, and in the late 13th/early 14th century Mangup became the centre of the Principality of Theodoro, whose ruling elite maintained Byzantine traditions and the use of the Greek language. The ruling dynasty, stemming from the area of Trebizond, was called Gabras (in Greek) or Chowra (in Turkish). In the late 14th century, one branch of the dynasty emigrated to Moscow, where they established the Simonov Monastery. The Khovrins, as they came to be known, were hereditary treasurers of Muscovy. In the 16th century, they changed their name to Golovin.

Between 1395 and 1404, Theodoro was under the control of Timur, but its prince, Alexios, managed to regain his independence after Timur's death, and his successors maintained it until the Ottoman conquest in 1475. In 1475, Stephen III of Moldavia sent his brother-in-law, Alexander Gabras, to Mangup with the purpose of replacing a local ruler from the Gabras family, who was Alexander's own brother and vassal to the Ottomans. In May of that same year, the Ottoman commander Gedik Ahmet Pasha conquered Caffa and at the end of the year, after five months of besieging Mangup, the city fell to the assault. While much of the rest of Crimea remained part of the Crimean Khanate, now an Ottoman vassal, former lands of Theodoro and southern Crimea were administered directly by the Sublime Porte.

After the Fall of Constantinople in 1453, many Greek-speaking Qaraites decided to migrate to the Mangup and Chufut-Kale as these places had a familiar Christian Greek culture.

The Turkish historian Djennebi mentions that in 1475, after the taking of Caffa, Gedik Ahmet Pasha decided to take possession of the fortress of Mankup. The Greeks established themselves therein and defended it but the Turks captured the fortress. The siege of Mangup lasted for half a year and the Turks used cannons.

The town's inexorable decline continued. In 1774 the fortress was abandoned by the Turkish garrison. The last inhabitants, a small community of Karaim, abandoned the site in the 1790s.

In 1901, a Greek inscription was discovered in the city. The inscription shows that in 1503, almost thirty years after the Turkish conquest, the inhabitants of Mankup still spoke Greek and were taking care to restore the walls of their city. From the inscription, historians learned that the population of Mankup was under the power of a Turkish governor.

In 1913, a Greek inscription was found in a basilica which mentions the Emperor Justinian. The inscription proves that under Justinian the city was already important enough to be considered by the Emperor. The same year another Greek inscription was discovered which invokes the blessing of Jesus Christ upon the builders of the wall.

Βyzantine bronze weights excavated at Mangup supply evidence that the residents followed the imperial weighting system.

== See also ==
- Chufut Kale
- Kara Dag
- Valley of Ghosts (Crimea)
- Suuksu
- Inkerman
