= Suuksu =

Cape in Crimea

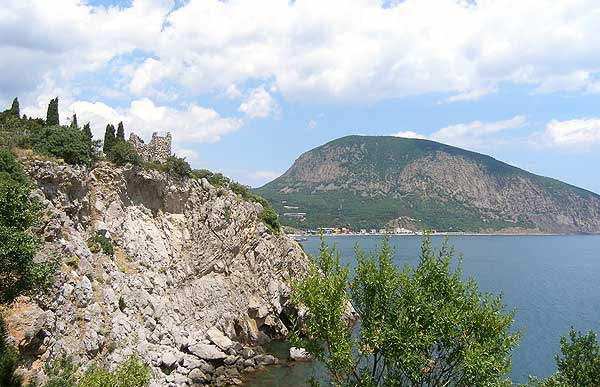
The ruin of a medieval tower on the Cape Suuksu

Suuksu or Suuk-su (Ukrainian: Суук-Су, Сувук-Сув; Russian: Суук-Су, Сувук-Сув; Crimean Tatar: Suvuq Suv) is a cape on the southern coast of Crimea between the town Gurzuf and western slopes of Mount Ayu-Dag (Bear Mountain). On top of the cape is an early medieval cemetery.

Excavation of the cemetery was begun in 1903 by Nikolai Repnikov and turned up a variety of jewelry, dishes and weapons. Burials from the 6th–7th centuries were conducted in crypts and chamber graves. These contain various ornaments: fibulae, belt sets and buckles, earrings, amber and carnelian beads, and so on. Graves from the 8th–10th centuries are slab-lined. Burials from this period contain almost no grave goods, which is associated with the spread of Christianity. The ethnic identity of the buried individuals has not been precisely determined; many experts associate them with Crimean Goths, while others link them to Hellenized Iranian peoples (Sarmatians, Alans).

The cemetery was named for the cape, where it is located. In the Crimean Tatar language, it means cold water (suvuq - cold, suv - water). A part of the archaeological site belongs to the Artek camp.
