= Godland =

Godland may refer to:

- Godland (film), a 2022 drama film directed by Hlynur Pálmason
- Godland (comics), a 2010s comic book series

== See also ==
- Godlands, Australian musician
- Gotland (disambiguation)
