= Gothic Kingdom =

Gothic kingdom or kingdom of the Goths (Latin: Regnum Gothorum, Gothic: 𐌲𐌿𐍄𐌸𐌹𐌿𐌳𐌰 𐌸𐌹𐌿𐌳𐌹𐌽𐌰𐍃𐍃𐌿𐍃, Gutþiuda Þiudinassus). Examples:

- Ostrogothic kingdom in present-day: Slovenia, Croatia, Bosnia-Herzegovina and, mainly, Italy;
- Visigothic kingdom in present-day: France and, mainly, Spain;
- Gepid kingdom in present-day: Bulgaria, Serbia and, mainly, Romania and Hungary.

== See also ==
- Oium
- Gothia (disambiguation)
