= Gothia =

Gothia may refer to:

- Gothia (Roman province), a fourth century Roman province in present-day Romania
- Götaland, a region in southern Sweden
- The land of the Crimean Goths in southern Crimea
- Principality of Theodoro, Greek principality in southern Crimea from early 14th century to 1475
- Septimania, a historical region in southern France
- Spanish March, a land in northern Spain
- Catalonia, the name being possibly derived from "Gothic land"
- Metropolitanate of Gothia, a diocese of the Patriarchate of Constantinople in the Middle Ages

== See also ==
- Gothland (disambiguation)
- Gotland (disambiguation)
- Gothia Cup, a football cup held in Gothenburg
- Gothia Towers, a hotel in Gothenburg.
- Arn de Gothia, a fictional medieval knight created by Jan Guillou
