= Partenit Mosque =

Mosque in Partenit, Crimea

- Partenit Cami
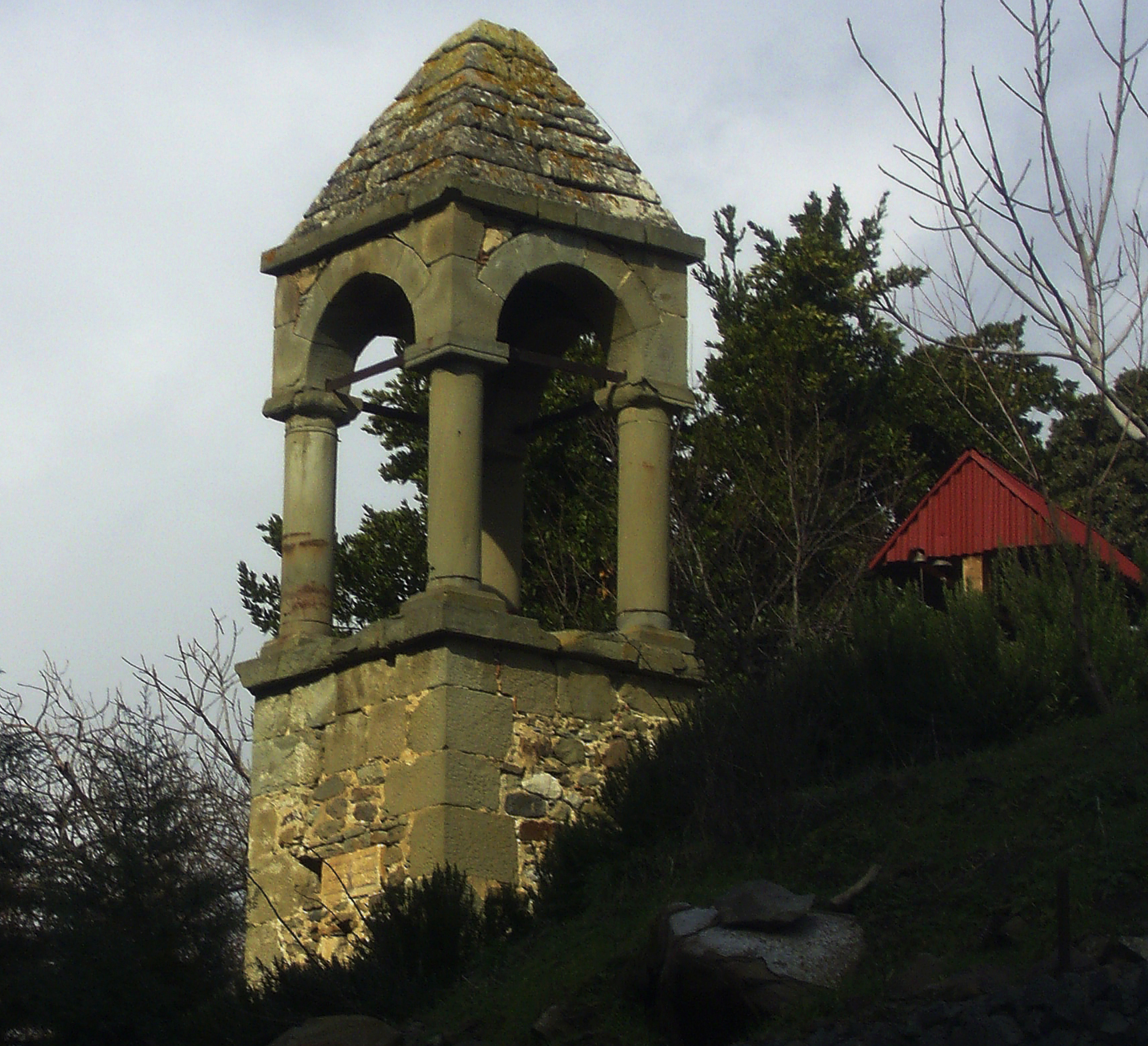

Religion
- Affiliation: Islam

Location
- Location: Partenit, Crimea
- Interactive map of Partenit Mosque

Architecture
- Completed: late 18th–early 19th century
- Destroyed: 1980s

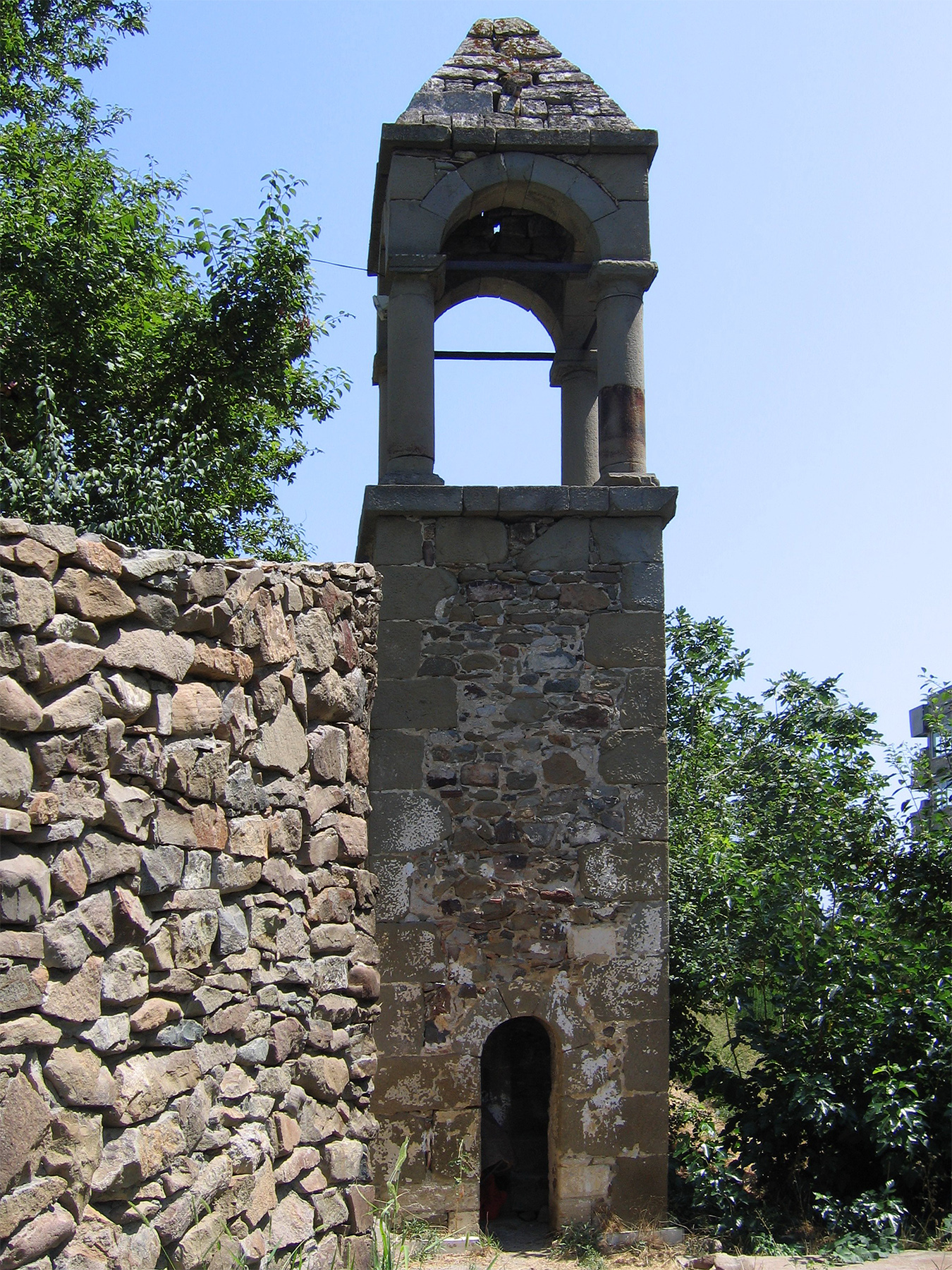
Mosque's minaret

Partenit Mosque (Crimean Tatar: Partenit Cami; Ukrainian: Партенітська мечеть, romanized: Partenitska mechet) is destroyed mosque in urban-type settlement Partenit in Crimean peninsula. A monument of the cultural heritage of Ukraine No. UA-01-103-0047.

== Overview ==
The name of the mosque has not been preserved. The main remaining part is either a minaret, or a minbar. It is made in the form of a square tower of wild stone, the top of which is crowned with a needlepoint.

The wall features a plaque glorifying Allah with quotations from the Quran.

A part of the stone wall stands nearby, all that remains of the former mosque. Not far away is a house of traditional Old Crimean architecture, which once housed a mullah and is now the Orthodox Church of the Annunciation of the Blessed Virgin Mary.

== History ==
Date of construction: late 18th to early 19th century.

The building of the mosque stood until the 1980s and was destroyed during the expansion of the old road, along with the old traditional fountain, Cesme, which was located next to it.
