= Gothland =

Gothland may refer to:

- Gotland, the largest island in the Baltic Sea; also a Swedish province, county, municipality, and diocese
- Götaland, the southernmost of the three lands of Sweden
- SS Gothland, a later name of the ocean liner SS Gothic (1893)
- Goathland, a village in North Yorkshire
- Gotenland, a planned Nazi German reichsgau in the Crimean peninsula
- Gothland, one of the ghost towns in South Dakota

== See also ==
- Gotland (disambiguation)
- Gothia (disambiguation)
