= Ignatius of Mariupol =

Greek bishop (1716–1786)

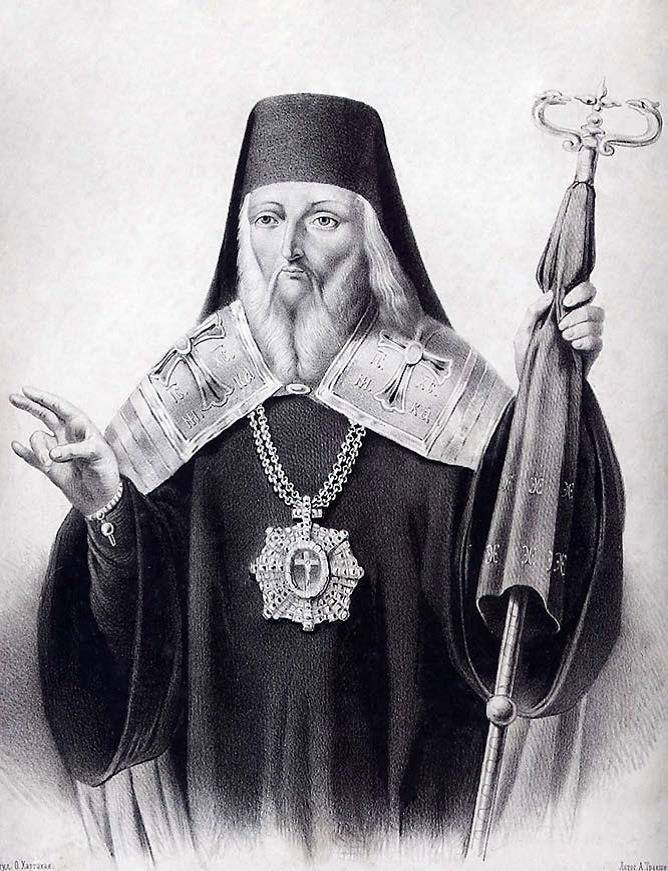

Bishop of Gothia and Caffa (1771–1778), Bishop of Mariupol (1778–1786)

Ignatius of Mariupol (1716 – 16 October [O.S. 3 October] 1786) was an 18th-century Greek bishop of Gothia and Caffa in Crimea and later of Mariupol, modern-day Ukraine. He is venerated as a saint by the Orthodox Church.

== Biography ==
He was born in 1716 in Kythnos as Iakovos Kozadinos or Gozadinos and he was member of the Kozadinos or Gozzadinos (Gozzadini) family. Kozadinos were descendants of a noble family emerged in Cyclades during the Frankish rule. Although originally of Catholic rite, they became Orthodox in the course of the centuries. In fact, in 1613 Ignatius' ancestors built the church of Agios Savvas in Chora of Kythnos, where he himself was later baptized.

As a young man Iakovos went to Mount Athos and became a monk in the Monastery of Vatopedi, adopting the ecclesiastical name Ignatius. In 1771 he became the Bishop of Gothia and Caffa in Crimea, where he offered his efforts for the spiritual revival of the Greeks and their Orthodox Christian faith. In 1778, he undertook the task of the exodus of the Orthodox Greeks and Armenians from Crimea, which was under the control of the Tatars, and their settlement in the area of Azov, where Mariupol was built and where he settled with his congregation and served as bishop of the Russian Orthodox Church. He died in Mariupol on 3/16 February 1786.

In 1997, Ignatius was declared a saint by the Ukrainian Orthodox Church (Moscow Patriarchate). In addition, by decree of the Greek Orthodox bishop of Syros, he is honored as a local saint in his place of birth. On October 1, 2016, part of his relics were transferred from Mariupol to Chora in Kythnos.
