= Gotland (disambiguation) =

Gotland is a province, county, municipality, and diocese of Sweden, and Sweden's largest island.

Gotland may also refer to:

== Relating to Gotland island ==
- Gotland County, an administrative division in Sweden comprising Gotland
  - Gotland Municipality, the single municipality in Gotland County
- Gotland official football team

== Ships and submarines ==
- Gotland-class submarine, of the Swedish Navy
  - HSwMS Gotland
- HSwMS Gotland, a 1933 seaplane cruiser of the Swedish Navy
- MS SNAV Toscana, a cruiseferry ordered as MS Gotland

== Animals ==
- Gotland pony, an old Swedish pony breed
- Gotland rabbit, a Swedish variety of rabbit
- Gotland (sheep), a breed of domestic sheep named for the Swedish island

== See also ==
- Gothia (disambiguation)
- Gothland (disambiguation)
- Duke of Gotland
