= Principality of Theodoro =

Former country on Crimean Peninsula

Coordinates: 44°35′N 33°48′E

Lordship of the city of Theodoro and the Maritime Region Αὐθεντία πόλεως Θεοδωροῦς καὶ παραθαλασσίας
- Early 14th century–1475
- Coat of arms

- Crimea in the middle of the 15th century. Theodoro shown in green
- Status: Principality
- Capital: Mangup (Doros, Theodoro)
- Common languages: Greek (official), also Crimean Gothic, Kipchak and others
- Religion: Eastern Orthodoxy
- Government: Monarchy
- Prince
  - c.1362 – c.1368: Demetrios of Theodoro (first recorded)
  - 1475: Alexander of Theodoro (last)
- Historical era: Late Middle Ages
  - First mention of the principality: Early 14th century
  - Ottoman conquest: 1475
Preceded by	Succeeded by
Empire of Trebizond	Ottoman Empire; Crimean Khanate

The Principality of Theodoro (Greek: Αὐθεντία πόλεως Θεοδωροῦς καὶ παραθαλασσίας), also known as Gothia (Γοτθία) or the Principality of Theodoro-Mangup, was a former Roman principality in the southern part of Crimea, specifically on the foothills of the Crimean Mountains. It represented the final rump state of the Eastern Roman Empire and the last territorial vestige of the Crimean Goths until its conquest by the Ottoman Empire by the Ottoman Gedik Ahmed Pasha in 1475. Its capital was Doros, also sometimes called Theodoro and now known as Mangup. The state was closely aligned with the Empire of Trebizond.

== Geography ==
The Theodoro principality wíth its capital Theodoro (also known as Mangup) was located in the Crimean Mountains in southern Crimea. From the first half of the 15th century it also included parts of the coastline, now stretching from Kalamita Bay in the west to possibly as far east as modern Rybache just west of Kanaka.

== Nomenclature ==
The name "Theodoro" (in the corrupted form Θεοδωραω) appears for the first time in a Greek inscription also dated to c. 1361/1362, and then again as "Theodoro Mangop" in a Genoese document of 1374. It was suggested by A. Mercati that the form is a corruption of the Greek plural Theodoroi 'the Theodores', meaning Saints Theodore Stratelates and Theodore Tiro, but N. Bănescu proposed the alternative explanation that it resulted from the definitive Greek name τὸ Δόρος (to Doros) or τὸ Δόρυ (to Dory), after the early medieval name of the region. Whatever its provenance, the name stuck: by the 1420s the official titulature of the prince read "Lord of the city of Theodoro and the Maritime Region" (αὐθέντης πόλεως Θεοδωροῦς καὶ παραθαλασσίας), while colloquially it was called Θεοδωρίτσι (Theodoritsi, 'little Theodoro') by its inhabitants. Local Greeks called the narrow strip of the coastal land from Yamboli (Balaklava) in the west to Allston (Alushta) in the east Parathalassia (Greek: Παραθαλασσια, "seashore"), while under Genoese rule it was known as Captainship of Gothia.

== History ==
=== Origins and early history (until 14th century) ===
In the late 12th century, the Crimean peninsula had seceded from the Byzantine Empire, but soon after the Sack of Constantinople in 1204, parts of it were included in the Trapezuntine Gazarian Perateia. This dependence was never very strong and was eventually replaced by the invading Mongols, who in 1238 poured into the peninsula, occupied its east and enforced a tribute on the western half, including Gothia. Their influence was limited, leaving administrative matters in native hands.

The Principality of Gothia is first mentioned in the early 14th century, with the earliest date offered by the post-Byzantine historian Theodore Spandounes, who records the existence of a "Prince of Gothia" in the reign of Andronikos III Palaiologos (1328–1341). Further references occur over the 14th century, with several scholars identifying the "Dmitry", one of the three Golden Horde princes in the Battle of Blue Waters (c. 1362/1363), with a Prince of Gothia. The name, in this case, may be the baptismal name of a Tatar lord of Mangup, named Khuitani. The historian Alexander Vasiliev identifies the first prince as Demetrios, attested at the Battle of Blue Waters in c. 1362/3. According to Vasiliev, he is possibly to be identified with the hekatontarches Khuitani, who erected the stone inscription mentioning the name "Theodoro" on the walls of Mangup at about the same time.

The princes following after Demetrios are known solely through Russian sources. A branch of the Greek dynasty Gabras were the rulers of Theodoro and are commonly identified by scholars with the family known from Russian sources as "Khovra". The prince Stephen ("Stepan Vasilyevich Khovra"), emigrated to Moscow in 1391 or 1402 along with his son Gregory. His patronymic implies the existence of a father named Basil, who possibly preceded him as prince (and was in turn possibly Demetrios' son). Stephen and Gregory became monks, and Gregory later founded the Simonov Monastery in Moscow. The Russian noble families of Khovrin and Golovin claimed descent from them.

The principality had peaceful relations with the Golden Horde to its north, paying an annual tribute as vassals, but was in constant strife with Genoese Gazaria colonies to the south over access to the coasts and the trade that went through the Crimean harbors.

In 1395, the warlord Tamerlane invaded the Crimean peninsula, destroying several towns including Gothia's capital Theodoro.

Hieromonk Matthew traveled to the capital of Theodoro in the late 14th century, recording his observations along the way in his work The Story of the City of Theodoro (Διήγησις τῆς πόλεως Θεοδώρου). He describes Theodoro as having endured a prolonged and devastating siege by the "Hagarites" (Muslims), emphasizing the severe conditions faced by its inhabitants. Modern archaeological research has largely confirmed the accuracy of Matthew's descriptions, and scholars associate the destruction he describes with the conflict between Tamerlane and Tokhtamysh in the region.

=== Peak (15th century) ===
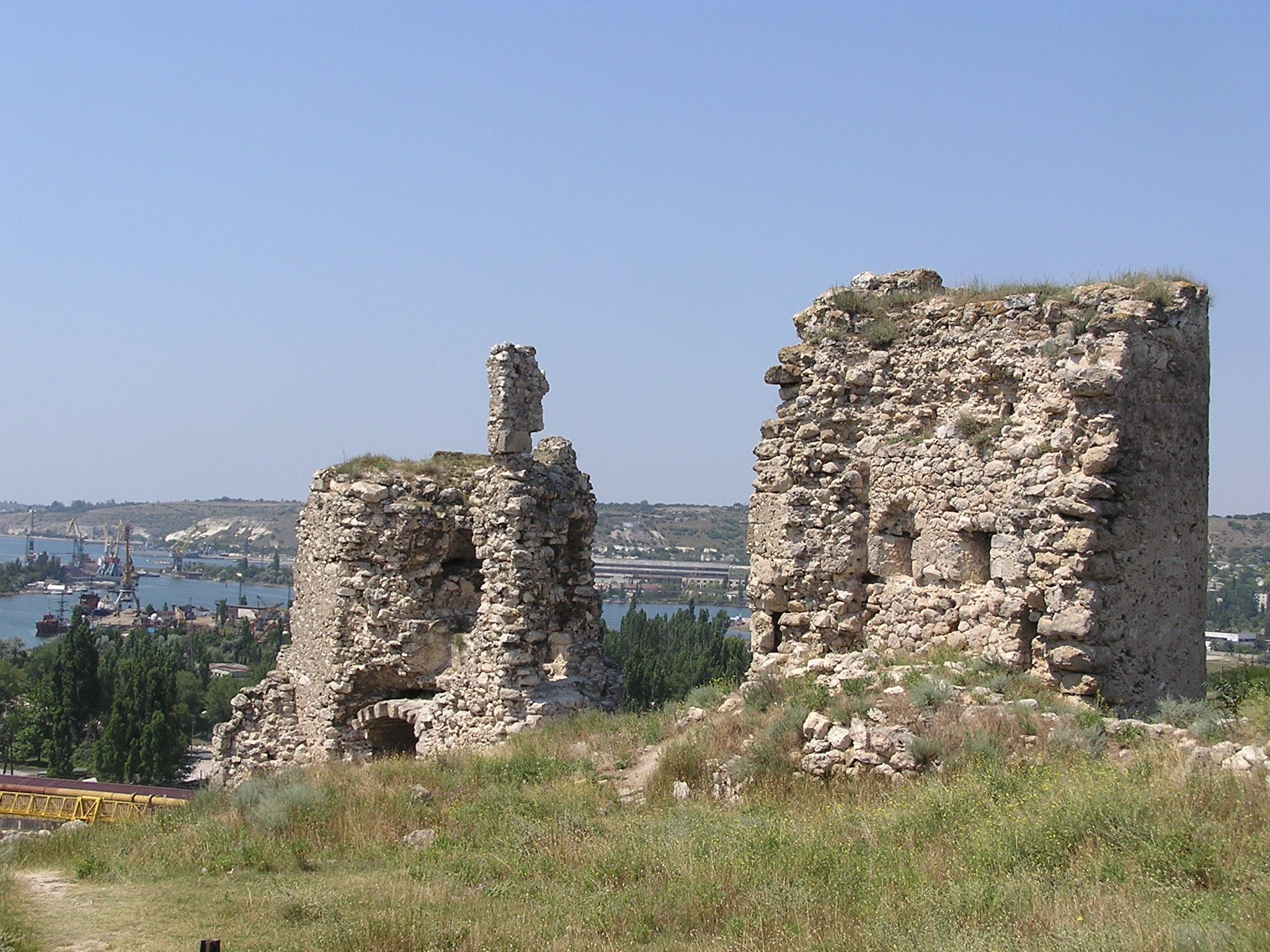
Ruined 15th-century fortress of Kalamita

After Tamerlane's death in 1404 Gothia grew to become one of the most significant powers of the Black Sea, profiting from a period of Genoese instability and the neglect of its Black Sea colonies, but also the rise of the Crimean Khanate. In about 1410/1411 at the latest prince Alexios ascended the throne, apparently with Genoese help. He soon began to challenge the Genoese for control over the Genoese province of Gothia, which comprised the coastal strip from Cembalo to Lusta. In 1423 prince Alexios attacked and the Genoese had to spend a large sum of money to repel him. While Alexios lost Cembalo it seems that he retained the rest of his conquests. Soon after he established relations with Venice, Genoa's archenemy. In 1431 Venice attacked Genoa, while Alexios supported a Greek rebellion in Cembalo in February 1433. A Genoese force reconquered Cembalo in June 1434 and plundered Kalamita, which had been abandoned, but was soon after annihilated by a Tatar army. Kalamita was reclaimed by Theodoro, while Cembalo revolted once more in 1439.

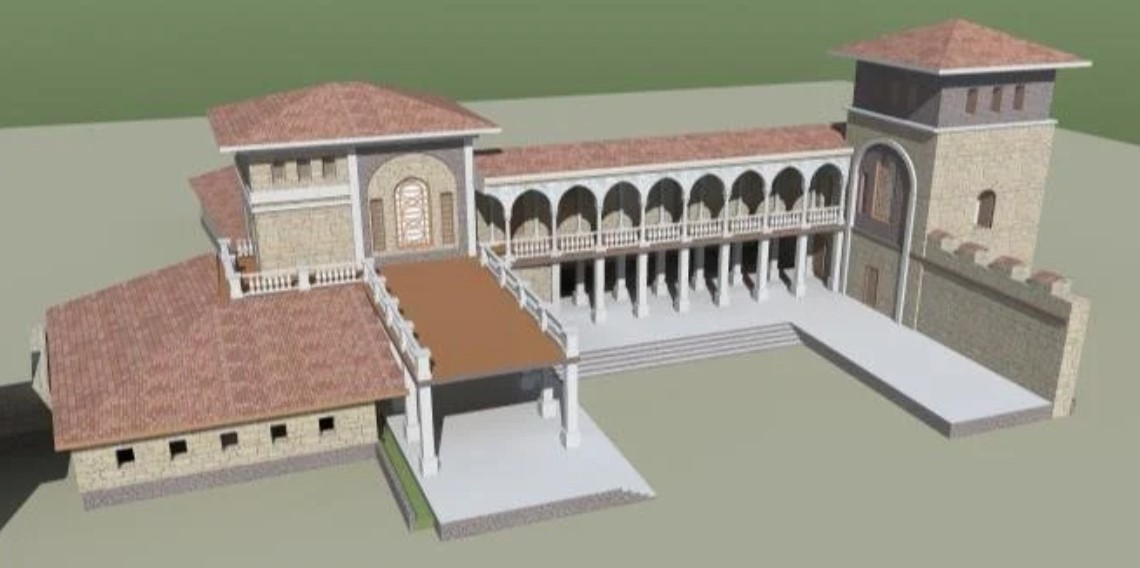
Reconstruction of the palace of prince Alexios built about 1425

Alexios died in 1444–45 or 1447. His heir was his eldest son John, who was married to Maria Asanina, a woman connected to the Byzantine imperial dynasty of the Palaiologoi and the noble lines of Asanes and Tzamplakon. The couple had a son, also named Alexios, who died young c. 1446/7, probably at Trebizond. His epitaph, titled "To the Prince's son" (τῷ Αὐθεντοπούλῳ), was composed by John Eugenikos and offers unique genealogical data on the family. John's reign appears to have been very short, or he may indeed not have reigned at all – A. Vasiliev speculates that he left Gothia for Trebizond as soon as Alexios I died – so another son of Alexios I, Olubei, succeeded as prince in c. 1447 and ruled until c. 1458. A daughter of Alexios I, Maria of Gothia, became in 1426 the first wife of the last Trapezuntine emperor, David.

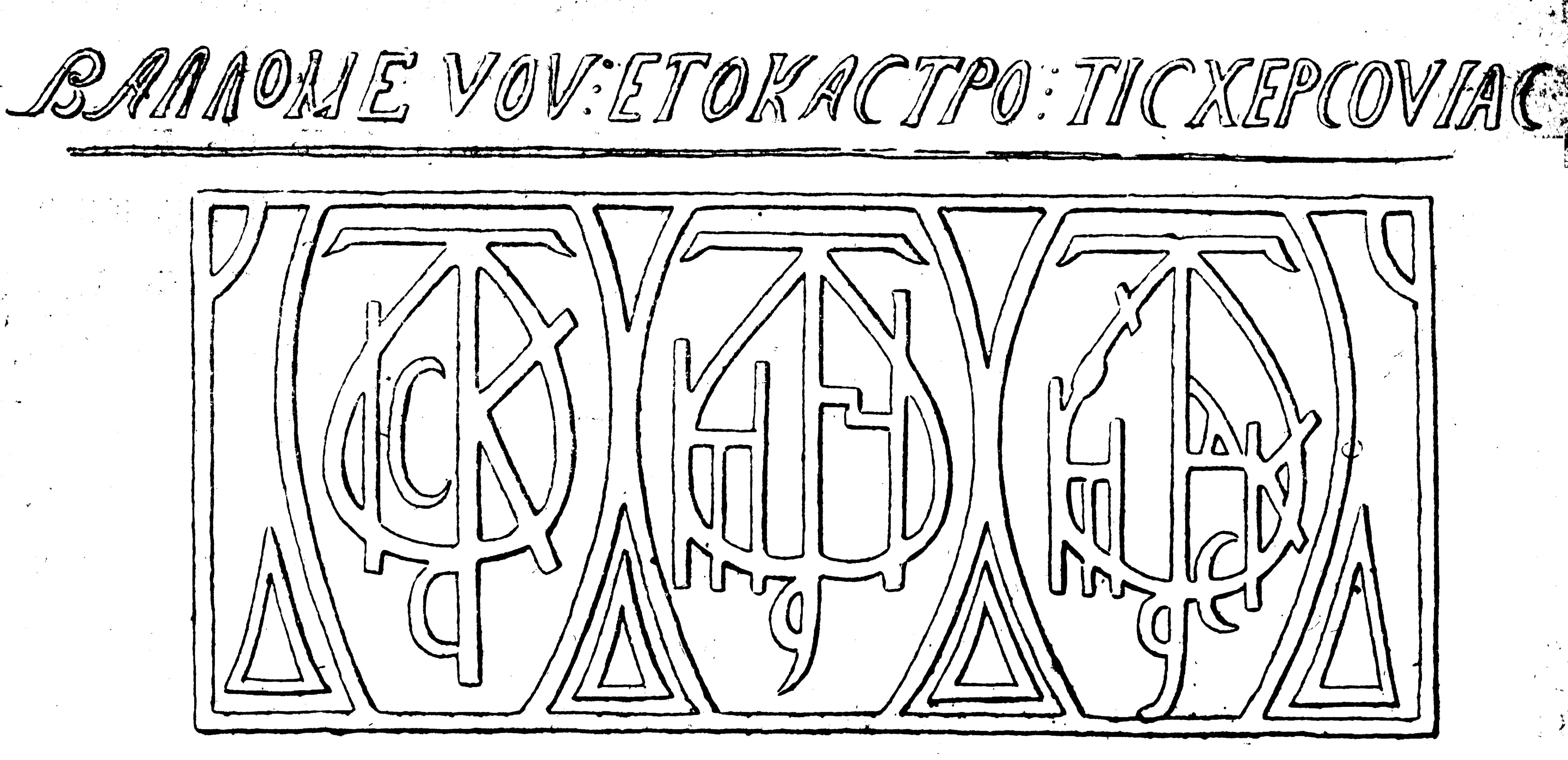
Now lost inscription from Kherson mentioning prince Isaac and Manuel (mid-15th century).

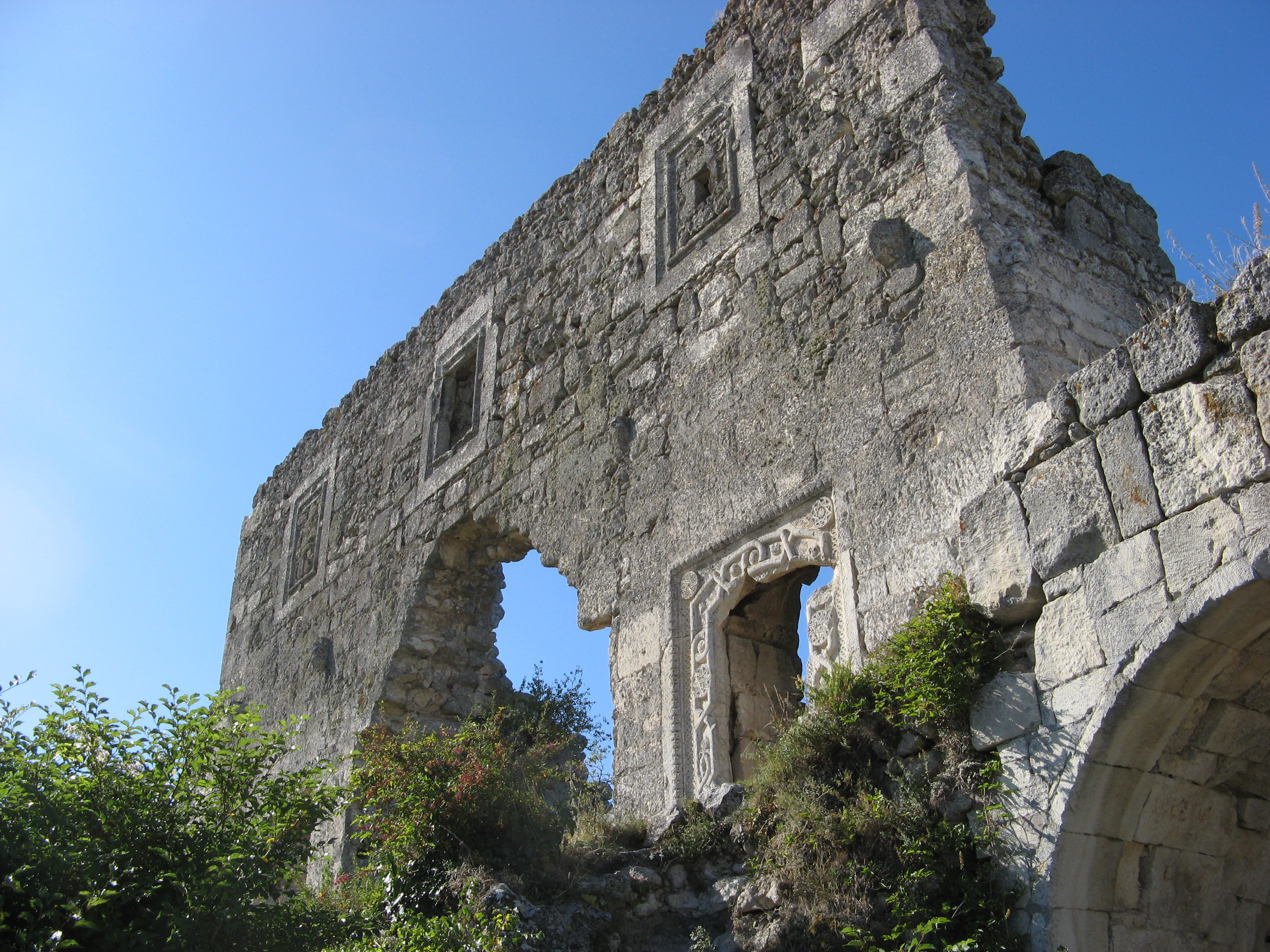
Mangup fortress donjon

In 1458 and again in 1472 Genoa considered the lord of Theodoro (dominus tedoro) to be one of the several powerful parties dominating the Black Sea (the others being the Crimean Khanate, Moldova and, until its fall in 1460, the Empire of Trebizond) and advised the consul of Caffa to seek peaceful relations with him.

Olubei is no longer mentioned after c. 1458, and no princes are known by name for some while; Genoese documents only mention "the lord of Theodoro and his brothers" (dominus Tedori et fratres ejus). In 1465, Prince Isaac is mentioned, probably Olubei's son and hence possibly reigning already since c. 1458. In the face of the mounting Ottoman danger, he engaged in a rapprochement with the Genoese at Caffa and wed his sister Maria Asanina Palaiologina to Stephen the Great, ruler of Moldavia. His increasingly pro-Ottoman stance in later years, however, led to his overthrow by his brother Alexander in 1475, with Stephen the Great's backing.

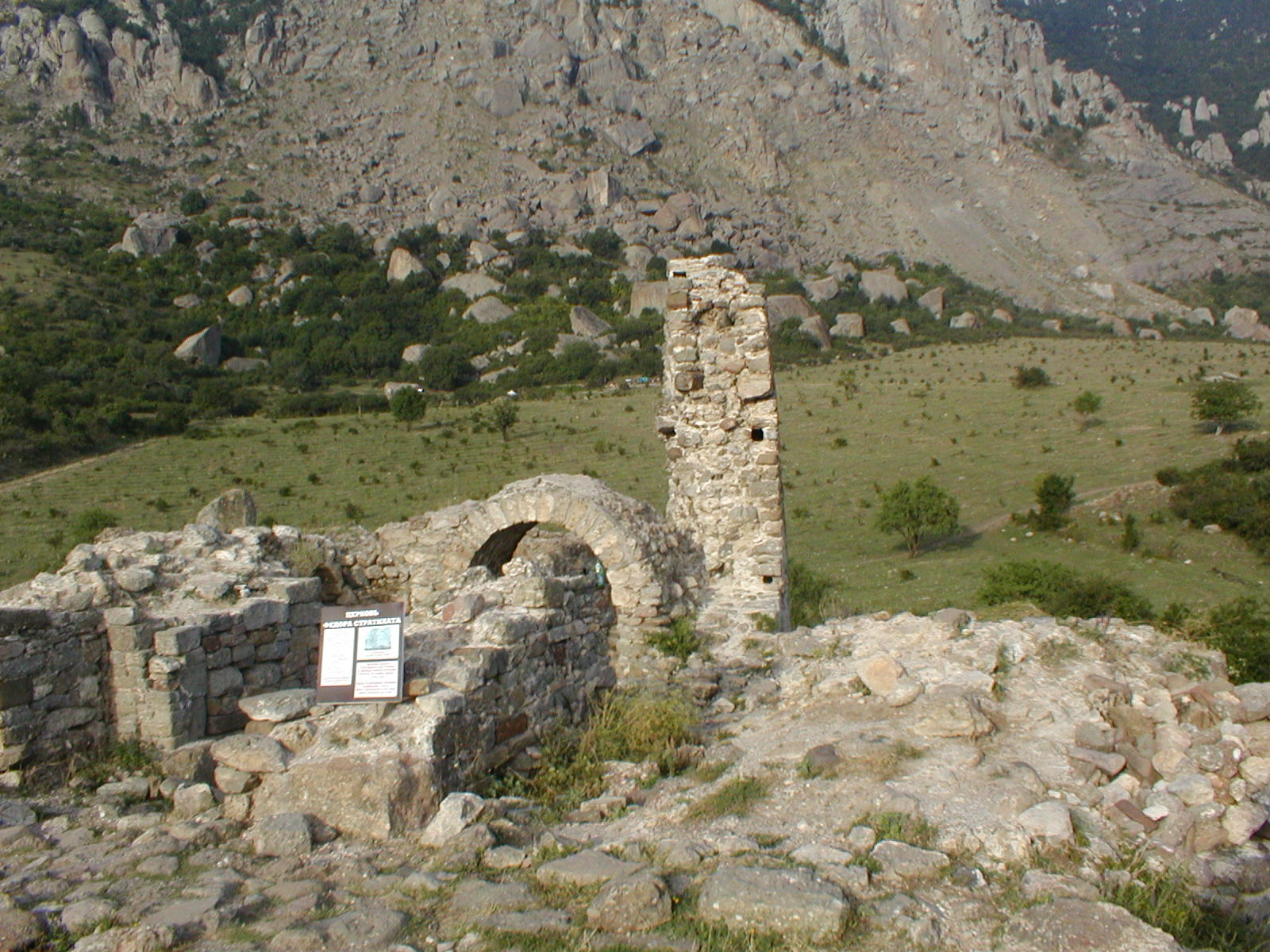
The ruins of the 15th-century Funa fortress

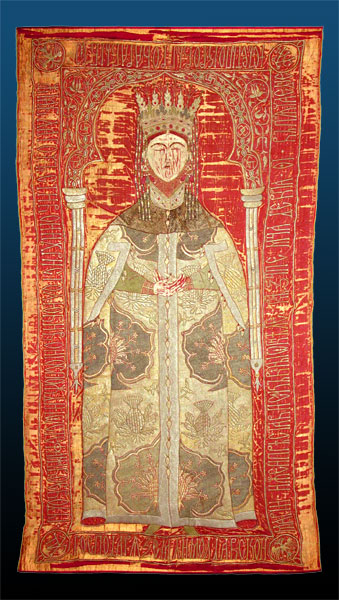
Burial shroud of Maria of Mangup, sister of prince Isaac and wife of Stephen the Great

During 1474, the people of Caffa appeared to have been on the verge of rebellion; official documents from this year describe the damage done to Gothic landowners and farmers or the burning of buildings in the border districts of Alushta and Cembalo. The prince at the time, Isaac (Italian documents write him Saichus or Saicus and the Russian Isaiko), fearing a war with Caffa, presented a formal complaint to the Genoese.

=== Ottoman conquest (1475) ===
On 20 May 1475, an Ottoman fleet left Constantinople and headed off to Crimea. By 6 June, Gedik Ahmet Pasha, the fleet's Ottoman Albanian commander, had conquered Caffa after five days of siege. The prince sent a message on 20 June informing the Hungarian king that Theodoro had been captured by Alexander, brother-in-law of Stephen the Great; however, he also mentioned that Caffa had been captured by the Ottomans, while the khan of Crimea had allied with the sultan.

The siege of Theodoro castle began sometime in September. The prince had three hundred Wallachians fighting in the defense. According to Vasiliev, the city endured five major assaults during the siege; in the end, Theodoro's food supply was blockaded and the people began to succumb to famine. At the end of December 1475, Mangup surrendered to the Ottomans under the condition that the Prince, the people, and their property would be spared. While much of the rest of Crimea remained part of the Crimean Khanate, now an Ottoman vassal, the former lands of Theodoro and southern Crimea were administered directly by the Sublime Porte.

According to the Ottoman historian Ashik Pasha-Zade, after Mangup surrendered the Ottomans treated it the same way as Caffa. The Ottomans took the chiefs of the city and brought them to Constantinople where they were executed. Their treasures were handed over to the Sultan, while their wives and daughters were given as presents to the Sultan's officials. Alexander and his family were also taken to Constantinople, where the prince was beheaded. His son was forcibly converted to Islam, and his wife and daughters became part of the Sultan's harem. After the city's capitulation, one of the churches was converted into a mosque, where a prayer was said for the Sultan. According to an Ottoman chronicler, "the house of the infidel became the house of Islam."

With the fall of Mangup, the principality ceased to exist; the last political remnant of the Roman Empire disappeared after 2,228 years of Roman civilization since the legendary founding of Rome in 753 BC.

== Ethnic origins ==
Experts have developed several points of view on the ethnic origins of the rulers of the principality.

=== Greek claim ===
The claim that the rulers of Theodoro were of Greek origin is the traditional historiographical position, a view primarily supported by the Greek names of the majority of the state's monarchs. Historians such as A. A. Vasiliev, N. V. Malitsky, and A. L. Yakobson advanced the theory that the ruling dynasty belonged to the Gabras (Gavras) family, a prominent Byzantine aristocratic house of the Komnenos era that had previously ruled the Empire of Trebizond. Vasiliev pointed to the historical existence of a village named Gavra in Crimea as onomastic evidence. He further noted that the surname Gavras (or its variant Tavrad) persisted into the modern era among the Christian populations along the northern shores of the Sea of Azov, who had been resettled there at the end of the 18th century from former Crimean Gothic and Theodorian territories.

According to Vasiliev's hypothesis, a member of the Gabras family was exiled to Crimea, and a branch of his descendants, close relatives of the 15th-century rulers of Gothia, subsequently migrated to Moscow around 1399, entering the court of Grand Duke Vasily I of Moscow. In Russian records, their surname was corrupted into the nickname Khovra, eventually developing into the noble Khovrin family, who in turn founded the Golovin boyar lineage. This connection is supported by the Velvet Book (a comprehensive genealogical register of the Russian nobility compiled around 1687), which states that the Khovrins arrived in Moscow "from the hereditary estates of Sudak, Kafa, and Mangup."

However, this Byzantine-Greek lineage has faced significant opposition from scholars like V. P. Stepanenko and H. F. Bayer. They argue that Vasiliev's reconstruction relies on excessive genealogical assumptions that are not directly supported by contemporary evidence. Critics point out that linguistic corruptions can alter names unpredictably and note that the surname Gavras was widely distributed across the Byzantine world during the Palaiologos renaissance, making its presence in Crimea insufficient proof of a direct connection to the lords of Trebizond. Consequently, they view the alleged princely pedigree of the Moscow Khovrins and their identification with the sovereign rulers of Mangup as speculative.

=== Circassian claim ===
In opposition to the traditional Byzantine theory, H. F. Bayer formulated an alternative thesis proposing that the ruling house of Theodoro was of Circassian origin, relying on several contemporary Western and Byzantine documents.

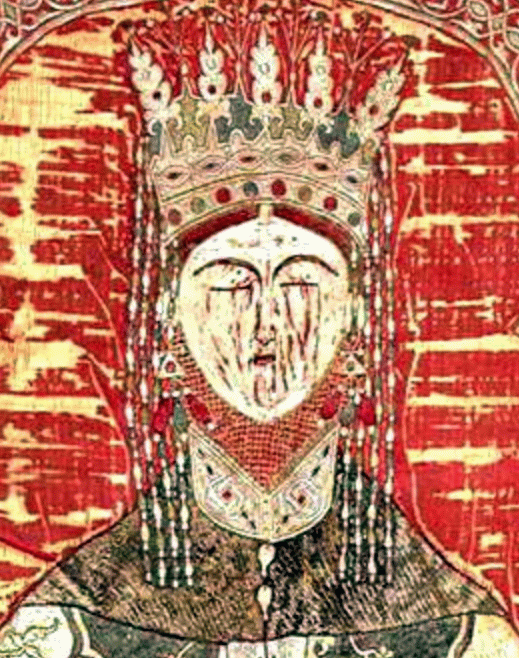
Self-portrait of Maria, Princess of Mangup, on a burial shroud. Putna, Romania

An Early New High German chronicle recording the 1472 marriage of Stephen the Great of Moldavia to Maria of Mangup, the sister of the reigning princes of Theodoro, explicitly identifies her as Circassian:

"In the same year [1472], on the 14th day of September, a princess from Maugop named Maria was brought to Stefan the Voivode; she was a Circassian..."

Furthermore, an entry in the Trebizond Synaxarion dated June 25, 1435, records the death of a prominent regional figure:

"On the same day the servant of God John Tziarkasis died, and remember him in your kingdom. (Indicta) 13, year 6943 (1435)"

Scholars identify this John as the eldest son and co-ruler of Alexios I, the first prominent prince of the Theodoro dynasty. Relying on the epigraphic analyses of Anthony Bryer, historians Samir Khotko and H. F. Bayer argue that the epithet "Tziarkasis" is a direct Greek transliteration meaning "the Circassian."

This position has gained traction among specialists in medieval Crimean history, including V. L. Myts, who accepted Bayer's conclusions and characterized Alexios's dynasty as ethnically Circassian (Adyghe). Myts observed:

"Although some Latin sources call Alexei I a 'Greek,' one should not rule out the 'Circassian' (Adyghe) origin of the ruler of Theodoro. At least two independent and different-time (1435 and 1472) sources refer to Alexei's eldest son, John, as a 'Circassian,' and to Maria Asanina Palaiologina, as a 'Circassian.'"

Myts suggested that the description of the rulers as "Greeks" in Genoese and Latin administrative accounts was ecclesiastical rather than ethnic, as Western chroniclers frequently categorized all populations adhering to the Byzantine Orthodox rite under the generic umbrella of "Greeks."

The theory is further supported by archaeological evidence. Excavations within the 14th- and 15th-century strata of the Alushta fortress and the fortifications at Pampuk-Kaya have revealed large quantities of domestic ceramics identical to contemporary pottery styles found in the Northwestern Caucasus. This indicates that late medieval Crimea experienced substantial migration and settlement from Circassia, a demographic shift also emphasized by Samir Khotko. Nonetheless, the Circassian hypothesis leaves certain questions unresolved, notably the exclusively Greek nomenclature of the dynasty and the political mechanisms by which a Caucasian elite established sovereignty over a remote Crimean principality.

Following the final Ottoman conquest of Theodoro in 1475, surviving members of the elite sought sanctuary in the remaining independent enclaves of the region. A diplomatic letter from Zaccaria de Ghisolfi, the ruler of Matrega, dated August 12, 1482, to the protectors of the Bank of Saint George, notes that after his own fortress fell to the Turks, he attempted to escape to Genoa. Having been plundered en route by the Moldavian voivode Stephen, he was forced to return to the Taman Peninsula, where the exiled Theodorian princes who had taken refuge alongside him drained his remaining resources to such an extent that he had to petition the bank for an emergency subsidy of 1,000 chervonets.

=== Gothic claim ===
A third school of thought maintains that the ruling house of the principality, traditionally referred to in Western sources as "Crimean Gothia", was of native Gothic extraction. Evaluating this claim requires examining the degree to which the Germanic Gothic population survived as a distinct identity in Crimea up to the 15th century, an issue addressed by several contemporary travelogues.

The earliest major medieval testimony comes from the Flemish Franciscan explorer William of Rubruck, who stopped at Soldaia (Sudak) on May 21, 1253, while traveling to the Mongol capital of Karakorum. Rubruck noted:

"... between Cherson and Soldaia there are forty castles, almost each of them had a distinct language; among them were many Goths, whose language was German"

While Rubruck's account predates the 15th-century zenith of Theodoro, some scholars, including Vasiliev, have questioned its precision, suggesting Rubruck did not personally traverse interior Gothia but gathered his data regarding the "forty castles" second-hand from merchants in Soldaia.

More immediate 15th-century observations confirm the persistence of a Germanic tongue. Between 1416 and 1427, the German knight Johann Schiltberger traveled through Crimea following his escape from Ottoman captivity. Noted for his detailed ethnographic and linguistic descriptions, Schiltberger explicitly recorded the survival of a distinct "Gothic language" in the peninsula.

This was corroborated in 1436–1437 by the Venetian statesman Giosafat Barbaro during his journey to Tana (Azov). Writing of the Crimean interior, Barbaro stated:

“Further beyond Kaffa, along the curve of the coast on the Great sea [Black sea], lies Gothia... The Goths speak German. I know this because my German servant was with me; they spoke with him, and [both sides] understood each other perfectly, just as a Furlan and a Florentine would understand each other...”

Following the fall of the principality, the Polish chronicler Maciej Miechowita (Matthew of Miechow) provided an account in his 1517 treatise, Tractatus de duabus Sarmatiis, asserting a direct ethnic link between the rulers and their subjects:

“the dukes of Man-cup, Goths by birth and language... two dukes and brothers from Man-cup, the only remaining Goths. The Goths [Ottomans] pierced with a sword the people of the Goth family and language, which offered hope for the descendants of the Goth tribe, and captured the fortress. Thus, the Goths were completely... eradicated, and even their genealogy is no longer visible"

Despite these explicit descriptions, the Gothic theory faces substantial historical criticism. The verified survival of a localized Gothic dialect among the rural population of the Crimean highlands does not automatically indicate that the elite administrative class of Theodoro spoke it. No direct epigraphic or diplomatic evidence survives regarding the internal spoken language of the court of Mangup. Critics conclude that while the 15th-century rulers presided over a territory known as Gothia, the dynasty itself may have been an integrated or separate elite, given that the highly Byzantinized Goths of the late Middle Ages bore little cultural or political resemblance to the original Germanic tribes that had migrated to Crimea in the 3rd century.

== Culture ==
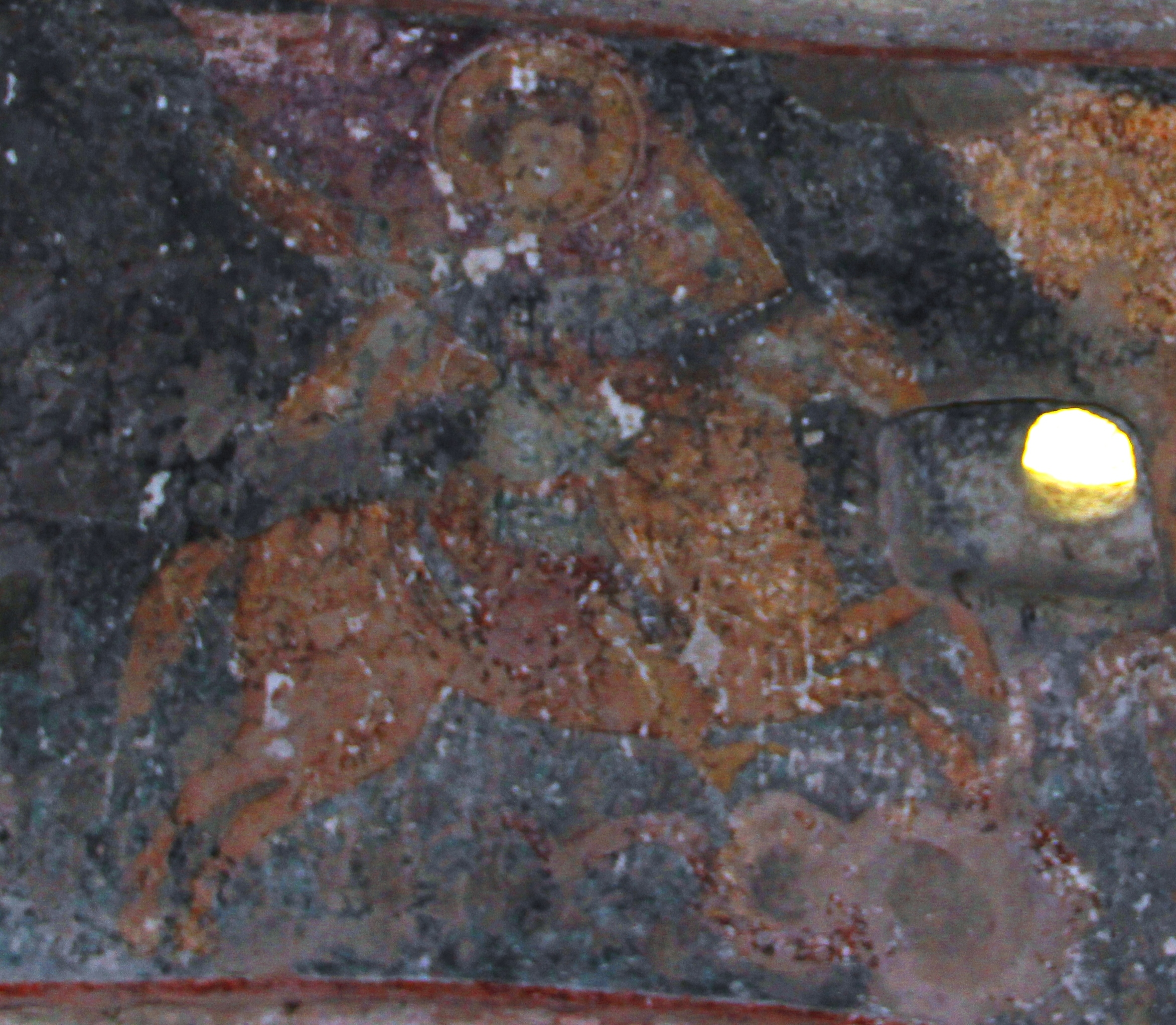
Fresco from Eski Kermen showing St. George killing the dragon (13th–14th centuries)

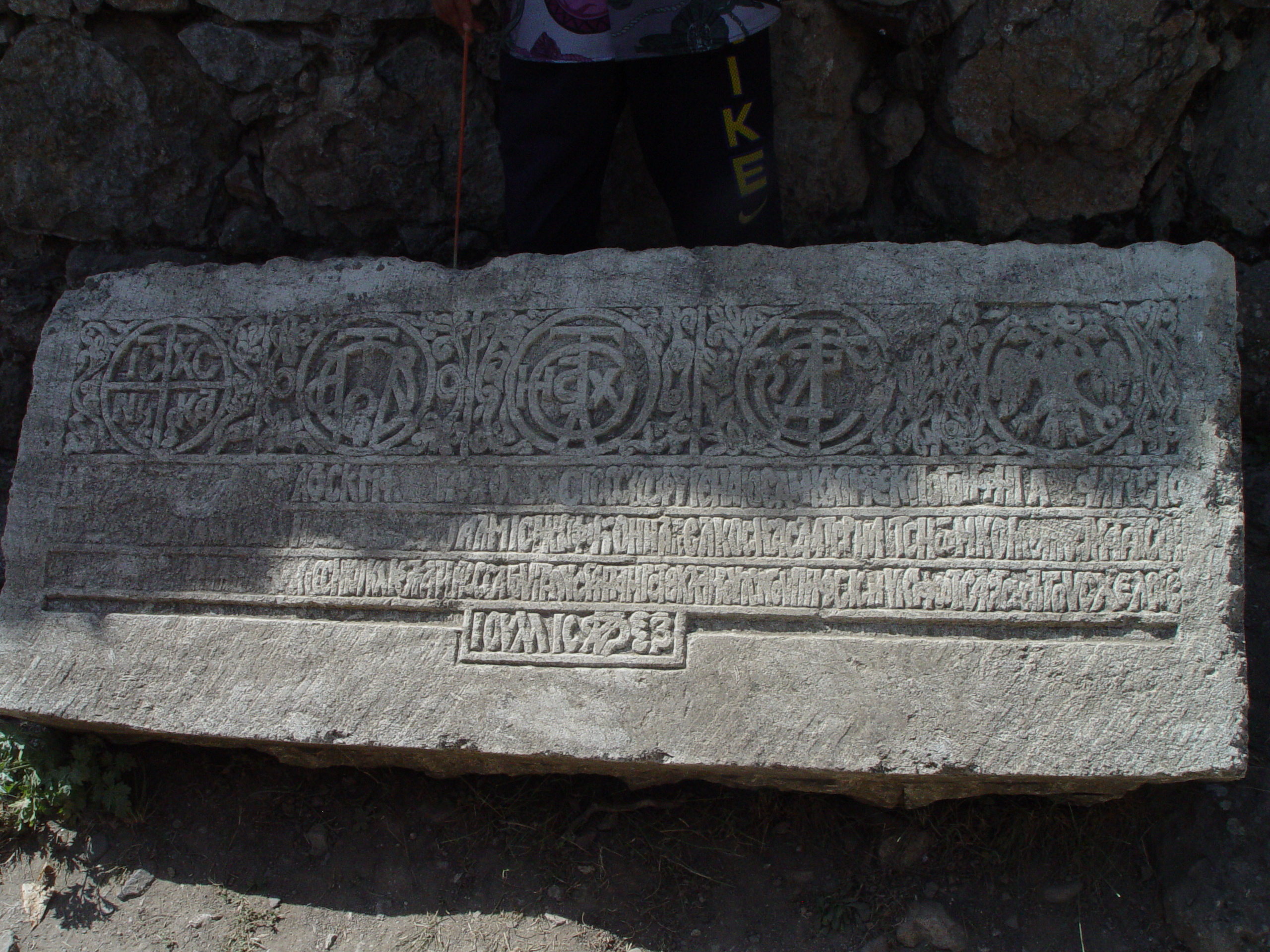
Foundation slab from Funa dated to 1459

Gothia's population was a mixture of Greeks, Crimean Goths, Alans, Circassians, Bulgars, Cumans, Kipchaks, and other ethnic groups, most of whom were adherents to Orthodox Christianity and Hellenized. The principality's official language was Greek.

The Crimean Goths had settled in Crimea since the 3rd century AD and became increasingly Hellenized, speaking both Greek and adhering to Orthodox Christianity. In the medieval period they mainly lived in rural areas and were still able to speak their language at least until the 16th and perhaps as late as the 18th century.

After the fall of Constantinople in 1453, many Qaraites, who were still Greek-speakers, decided to migrate to Crimea and in particular to the Principality of Theodoro and Chufut-Kale, as Crimea had a familiar Christian Greek culture.

Various cultural influences can be traced in Gothia: its architecture and Christian wall paintings were essentially Byzantine, although some of its fortresses also display a local as well as Genoese character. Inscribed marble slabs found in the region were decorated with a mixture of Byzantine, Italian, and Tatar decorative elements.

In 1901, a Greek inscription was discovered in the city of Mangup. The inscription shows that in 1503, almost thirty years after the Turkish conquest, the inhabitants of Mangup still spoke Greek. The city was under the power of a Turkish governor. The next years, many Greek inscriptions, dated before the Ottoman conquest were found at the city.

Greek inscriptions were also found at the city of Inkerman.

Βyzantine bronze weights excavated at Mangup supply evidence that the residents followed the imperial weighting system.

After the Turkish conquest in 1475, the Turks preserved the religion and religious institutions of the Greeks, as well as the Greek ecclesiastical organisation.

== See also ==
- Despotate of the Morea
- Fall of Constantinople

== Sources ==
- Albrecht, Stefan (2013). "Ein Spielball der Mächte: Die Krim im Schwarzmeerraum (VI.-XV. Jahrhundert)". In Stefan Albrecht; Michael Herdick (eds.). Die Höhensiedlungen im Bergland der Krim. Umwelt, Kulturaustausch und Transformation am Nordrand des Byzantischen Reiches (in German). Schnell & Steiner. ISBN 978-3-7954-2768-9.
- Beyer, Hans-Veit (2001). История крымских готов как интерпретация Сказания Матфея о городе Феодоро [History of the Crimean Goths as an interpretation of the Tale of Matthew on the city of Theodoro] (in Russian). Yekaterinburg: Ural University Press. ISBN 5-7525-0928-9.
- Bryer, Anthony M. (1970). "A Byzantine Family: The Gabrades, c. 979 – c. 1653". University of Birmingham Historical Journal. XII. Birmingham: 164–187.
- Fadeyeva, Tatiana M.; Shaposhnikov, Aleksandr K. (2005). Княжество Феодоро и его князья [The Principality of Theodoro and its princes] (in Russian). Simferopol: Biznes-Inform. ISBN 9789666480616.
- Gorovei, Ștefan S. (2020). "The Principality of Theodoro (Mangup) and Stephen the Great's Moldavia: Observations and Hypotheses". In Florin Curta and Dušan Zupka (ed.). From Pax Mongolica to Pax Ottomanica. Brill. pp. 146–168.
- Karpov, Sergei P. (1996). "The Crimeans". In Sigfried J. de Laet (ed.). History of Humanity: From the seventh to the sixteenth century. Routledge. pp. 672–676.
- Khvalkov, Evgeny (2018). The Colonies of Genoa in the Black Sea Region: Evolution and Transformation. Routledge.
- Pilat, Liviu; Cristea, Ovidiu (2 October 2017). The Ottoman Threat and Crusading on the Eastern Border of Christendom during the 15th Century. BRILL. ISBN 978-90-04-35380-0.
- Khvalkov, Evgeny (August 2017). The Colonies of Genoa in the Black Sea Region: Evolution and Transformation. Routledge. ISBN 978-1138081604.
- Kołodziejczyk, Dariusz (2011). The Crimean Khanate and Poland-Lithuania: International Diplomacy on the European Periphery (15th-18th Century). A Study of Peace Treaties Followed by Annotated Documents. Leiden: Brill. ISBN 9789004191907. Archived from the original on 2017-06-30.
- Pritsak, Omeljan (1991). "Dory". In Kazhdan, Alexander (ed.). The Oxford Dictionary of Byzantium. Oxford University Press. pp. 654–655. ISBN 978-0-19-504652-6.
- Nicol, Donald M. (14 October 1993). The Last Centuries of Byzantium, 1261-1453. Cambridge University Press. ISBN 978-0-521-43991-6.
- Shepard, Jonathan, ed. (2008). The Cambridge History of the Byzantine Empire C.500-1492. Cambridge University Press. ISBN 978-0-521-83231-1.
- Vasiliev, Alexander A. (1936). The Goths in the Crimea. Cambridge, MA: The Mediaeval Academy of America.
- Vasilyev, A. V.; Avtushenko, M. N. (2006). Загадка княжества Феодоро [The riddle of the principality of Theodoro] (in Russian). Sevastopol: Bibleks. ISBN 9789668231643.
- Zamoryakhin, A. V. (2015). Об этнической идентификации владетелей Феодоро XV века [On the Ethnic Identification of the Rulers of Theodoro in the 15th Century]. Perm University Herald. Series: History (in Russian) (4 (31)): 172–178. ISSN 2219-3111.
