= Eski-Kermen =

Coordinates: 44°36′36″N 33°44′29″E

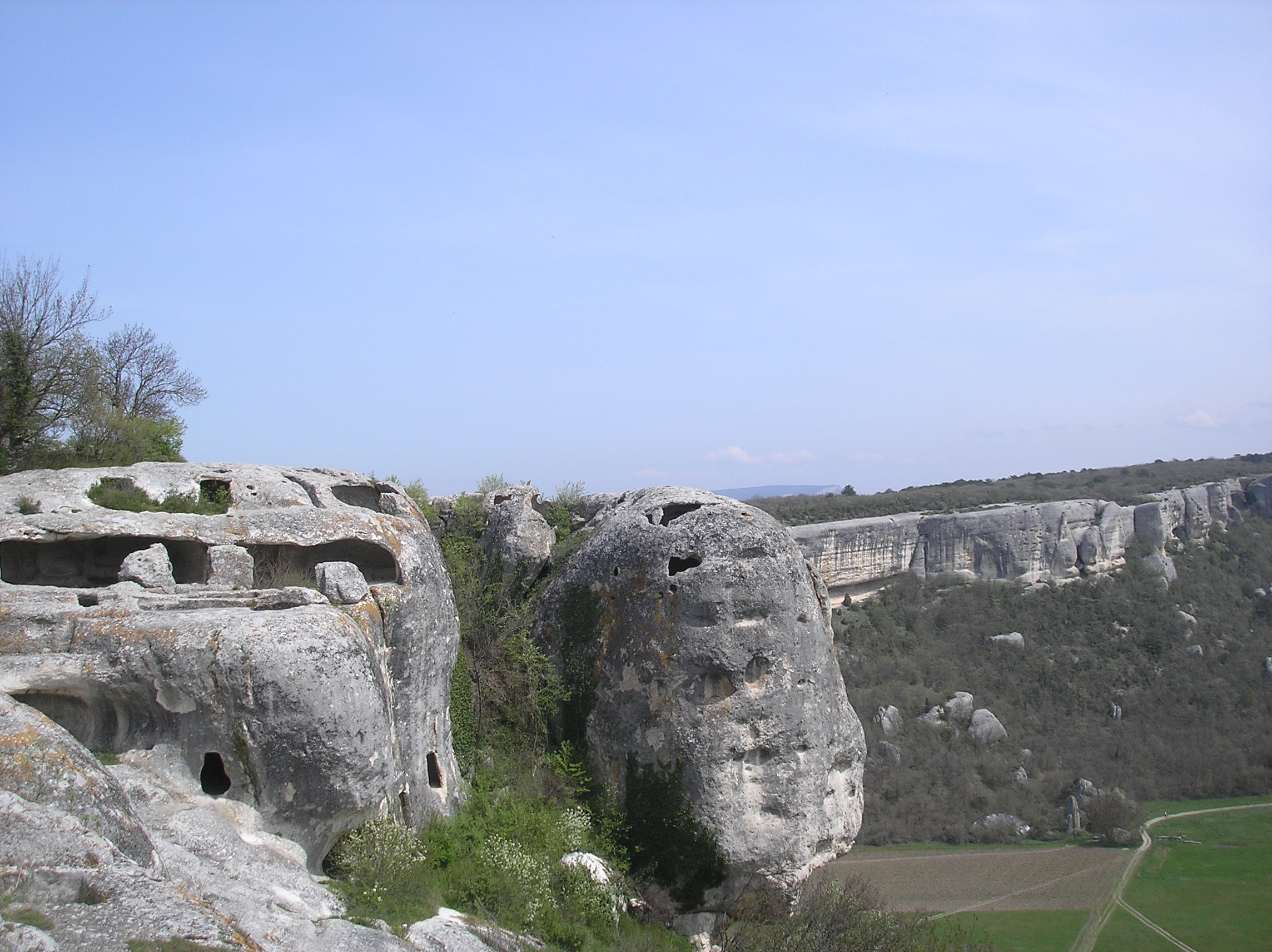
- Partial view of the remains of the fortress at Eski Kermen
- Interactive map of Eski-Kermen

Immovable Monument of National Significance of Ukraine
- Official name: Руїни печерного міста “Ескі-Кермен” (Ruins of the cave town of Eski-Kermen)
- Type: Architecture
- Reference no.: 010089

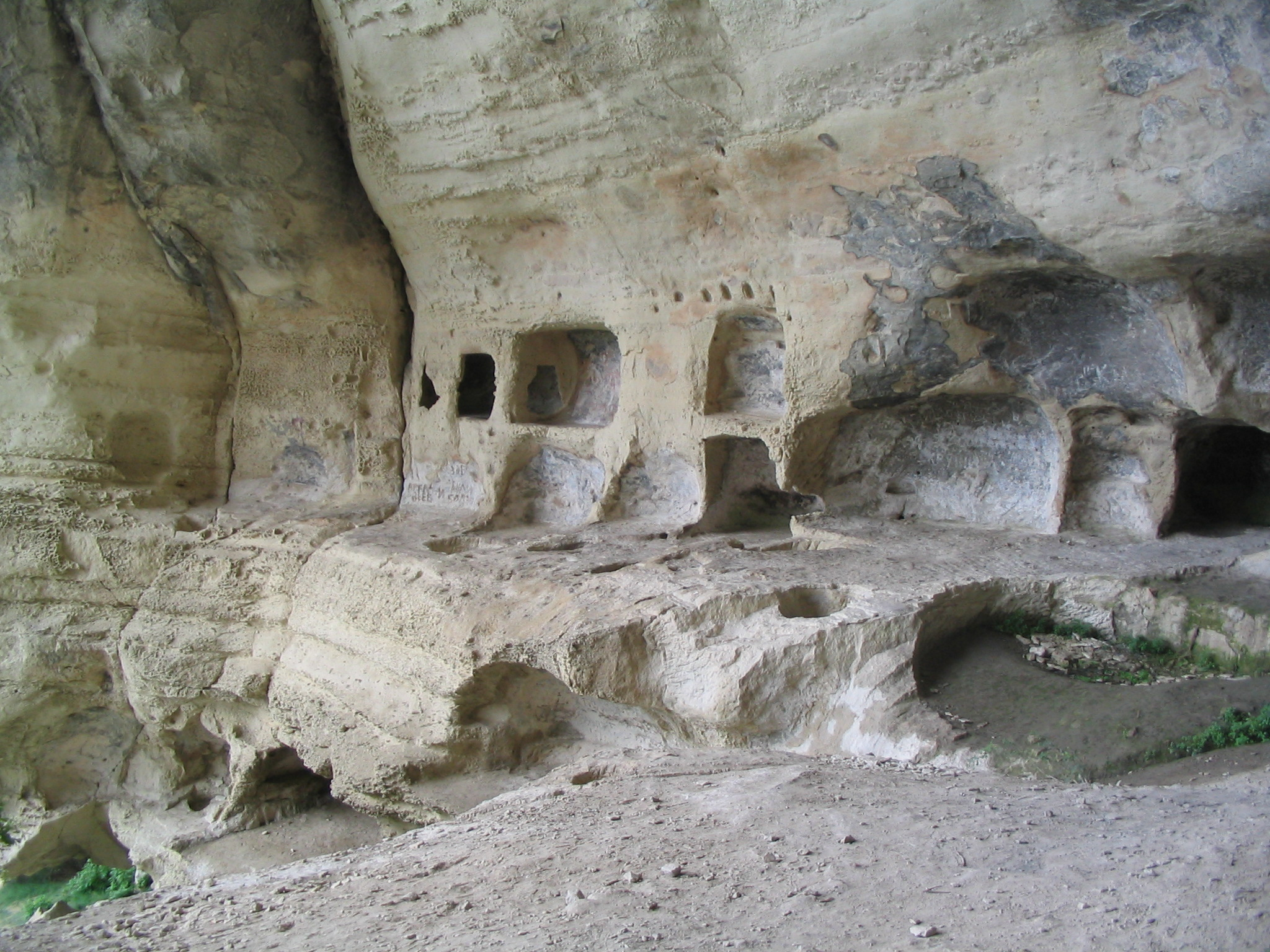
Eski-Kermen, inside detail

Eski-Kermen or Eski Kermen (Ukrainian: Ескі-Кермен; Russian: Эски-Кермен) was a cave town and fortress in the Crimea in the south of Ukraine. Founded by the Byzantine Empire in the 6th century to defend against the Göktürks, it was conquered by the Khazars in the 7th or 8th century.

The fortress was built on a plateau of about 1 km by 200m. Remains have been found of a basilica. The occupants were probably Alans or Goths. The military importance of the place disappeared after the Khazars had conquered it, but it remained a thriving cave dwelling until at least the 11th century, during the rule of the Pechenegs. It seems to have been deserted in the 14th century, under the rule of the Tatars. Nowadays, most surface structures have disappeared and only some 400 cave rooms remain.
