= Partenit =

Partenit: Партенiт (Ukrainian); Παρθένιον (Ancient Greek); Partenit (Crimean Tatar); Партенит (Russian)
- Urban-type settlement
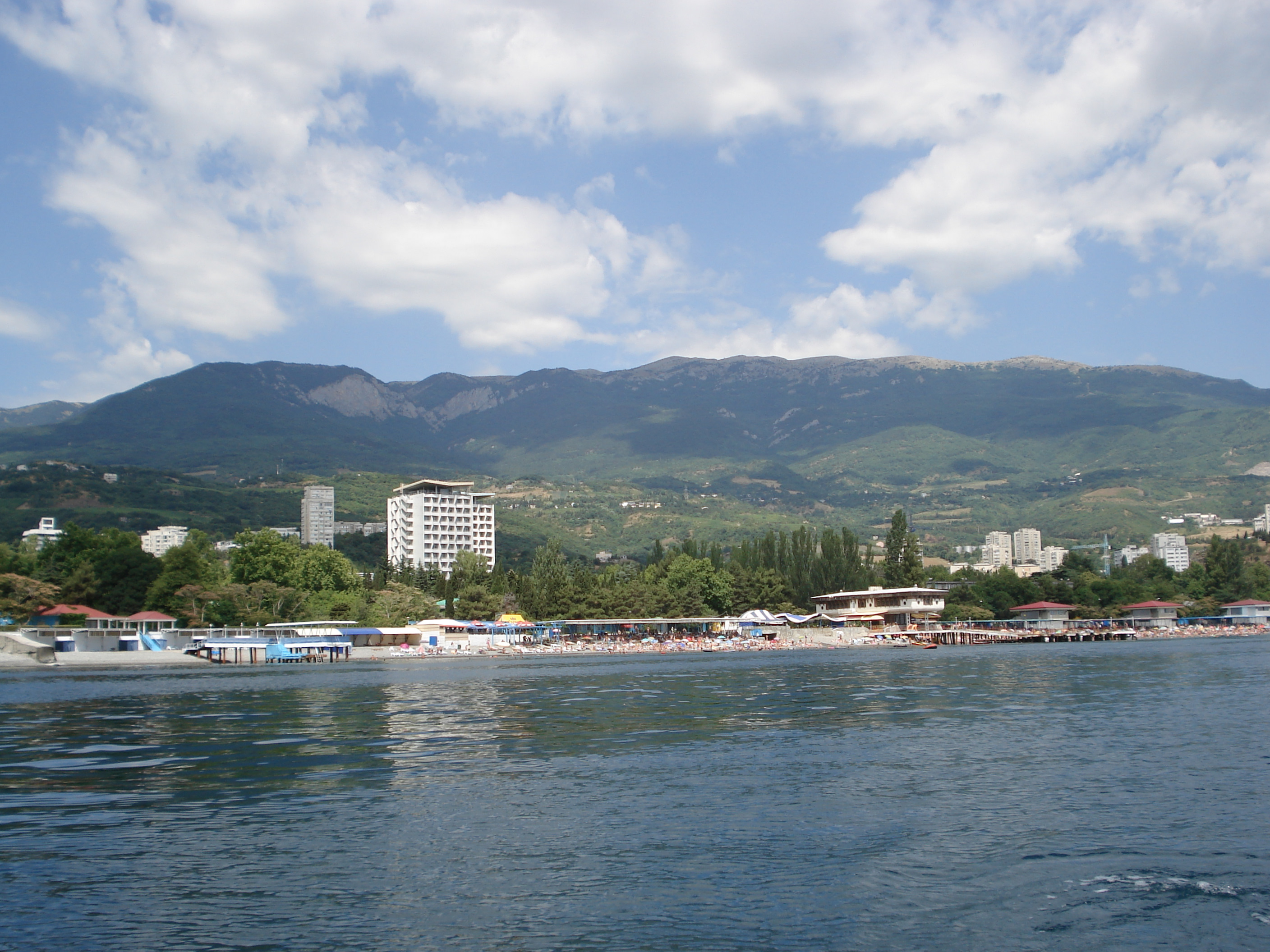

- Flag Seal
- Interactive map of Partenit
- Location of Partenit within the Crimea Partenit (Ukraine)
- Coordinates: 44°34′35″N 34°20′23″E
- Republic: Crimea
- Municipality: Alushta Municipality
- Local council: Partenit
- Elevation: 30 m (98 ft)

Population (2014)
  - Total: 6,193
- Time zone: UTC+4 (MSK)
- Postal code: 98542 — 98544
- Area code: +380-6560
- Former name: Frunzenskoye (1945 - 1991)

Partenit (Ukrainian: Партенiт, Russian: Партенит, Crimean Tatar: Partenit, Ancient Greek: Παρθένιον) is a seaside urban-type settlement under the administrative jurisdiction of the town of regional significance of Alushta in the southern part of the Autonomous Republic of Crimea (in Yalta Municipality), a territory recognized by a majority of countries as part of Ukraine and since 2014 occupied and incorporated by Russia as the Republic of Crimea. Population: 6,193 (2014 Census).

Lying just east of a mountain which Turkish speakers named Ayu Dağ (Russian: Медведь-гора; which means Bear Mountain), Partenit is on a fairly flat coastal plot of land, although the elevation quickly rises the further away one goes from the sea. Much of the architecture of the city is in the Soviet realist style. The current permanent-resident population is largely Russian and Ukrainian, with a significant influx of Tatars and Armenians.

== History ==
Originally an ancient Greek settlement named Parthenium (Ancient Greek: Παρθένιον), the name derived from the word Parthenon. It had been subsequently settled or invaded by, Goths, Turks, Genoese, Tatars, and Germans. It is in wine country; the nearby Massandra winery is famous for its production of Bastardo and other wines.

From 1945 to 1992 or 1993 the village was renamed to Frunzenske (Ukrainian: Фрунзенське, Russian: Фрунзенское, romanized: Frunzenskoye) after Mikhail Frunze.

== Tourist attractions and sights ==
Partenit has two beaches. One is the public beach which is free. The other is on the property of the military resort and much bigger. Most tourists rent an apartment from a local renter, and the going rate in recent years has been about $20/day for an apartment within a 10-minute walk of the beach.

There are several businesses offering excursions, set up for tourists between the bazaar and the beach, to different parts of Crimea, including to Massandra and Livadia, as well as waterfalls. A local tour goes through Ayu Dag, tracing its history through earthquakes and past ruins of ancient churches of the Goths. One of the first national parks in Ukraine was established to protect Ayu Dag.

Another popular sight is a plantation of 28 olive trees, which is also known as ″28 Old Olives″ (Ukrainian: 28 стародавніх олив; Russian: 28 древних олив), which are estimated to be over 500 years old. The trees are 7–9 meters tall and the trunks 2–3 meters wide. The vegetation in the city is mediterranean, due to southern Crimea's humid subtropical climate (Köppen classification Cfa), which borders on a hot-summer mediterranean climate (Köppen classification Csa). In addition to olive trees, various types of palm trees can be seen in the city (mostly Chinese windmill palms, but also species like the Canary Island date palm and the Washington fan palm), as well as the stone and Aleppo pines, large oleander shrubs, fig trees, cypress trees and other mediterranean plants.

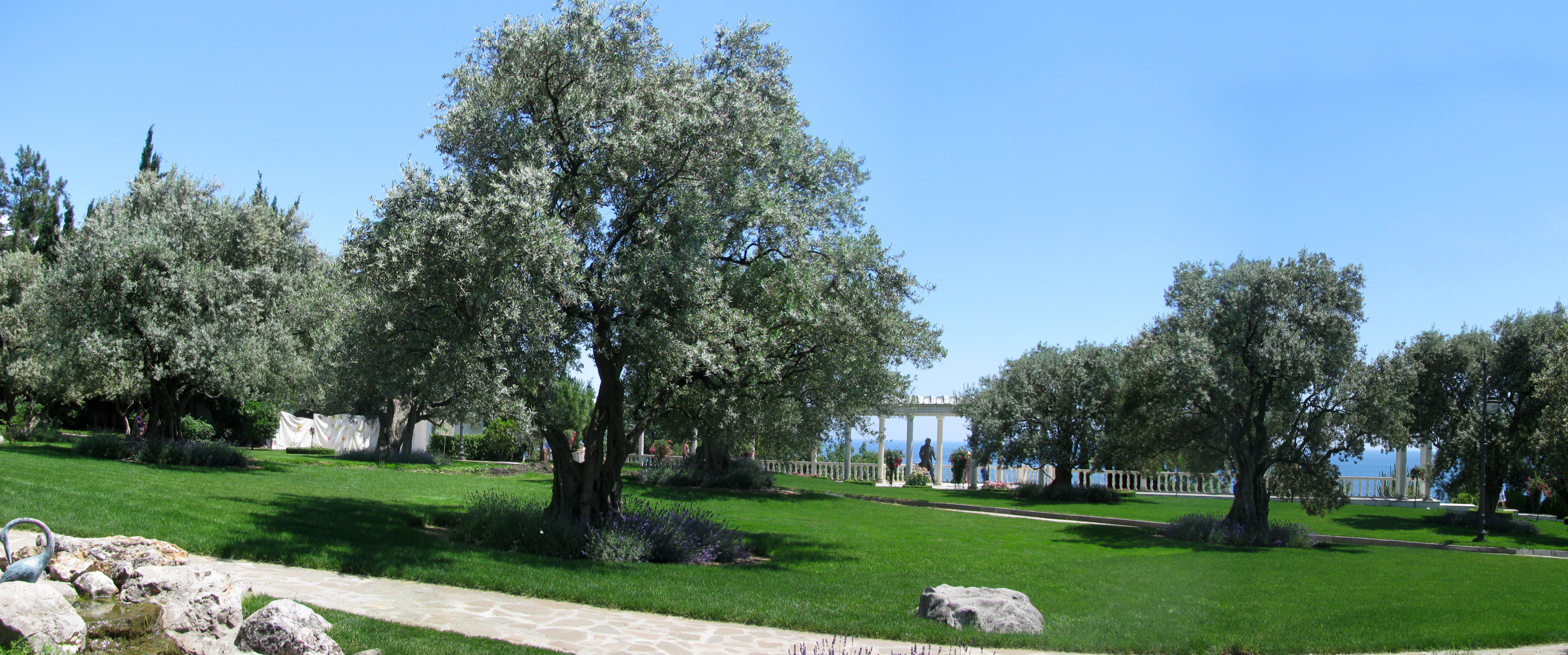
"28 old olives"

== Demographics ==
As of the Ukrainian national census in 2001, the city had a population of 6,391 people. Ethnic Ukrainians and Russians account for the overwhelming majority of the population, smaller minorities are Crimean Tatars, Belarusians, Moldovans and Armenians. Over 80% of the population speaks Russian as their primary language, while Ukrainian is natively spoken by a significant minority. The exact linguistic composition was as follows:

Native languages in Partenit
	percent
Russian	83.0%
Ukrainian	15.9%
Crimean Tatar	0.3%
Belarusian	0.2%
Moldovan	0.2%
Armenian	0.1%
others	0.3%

== Gallery ==
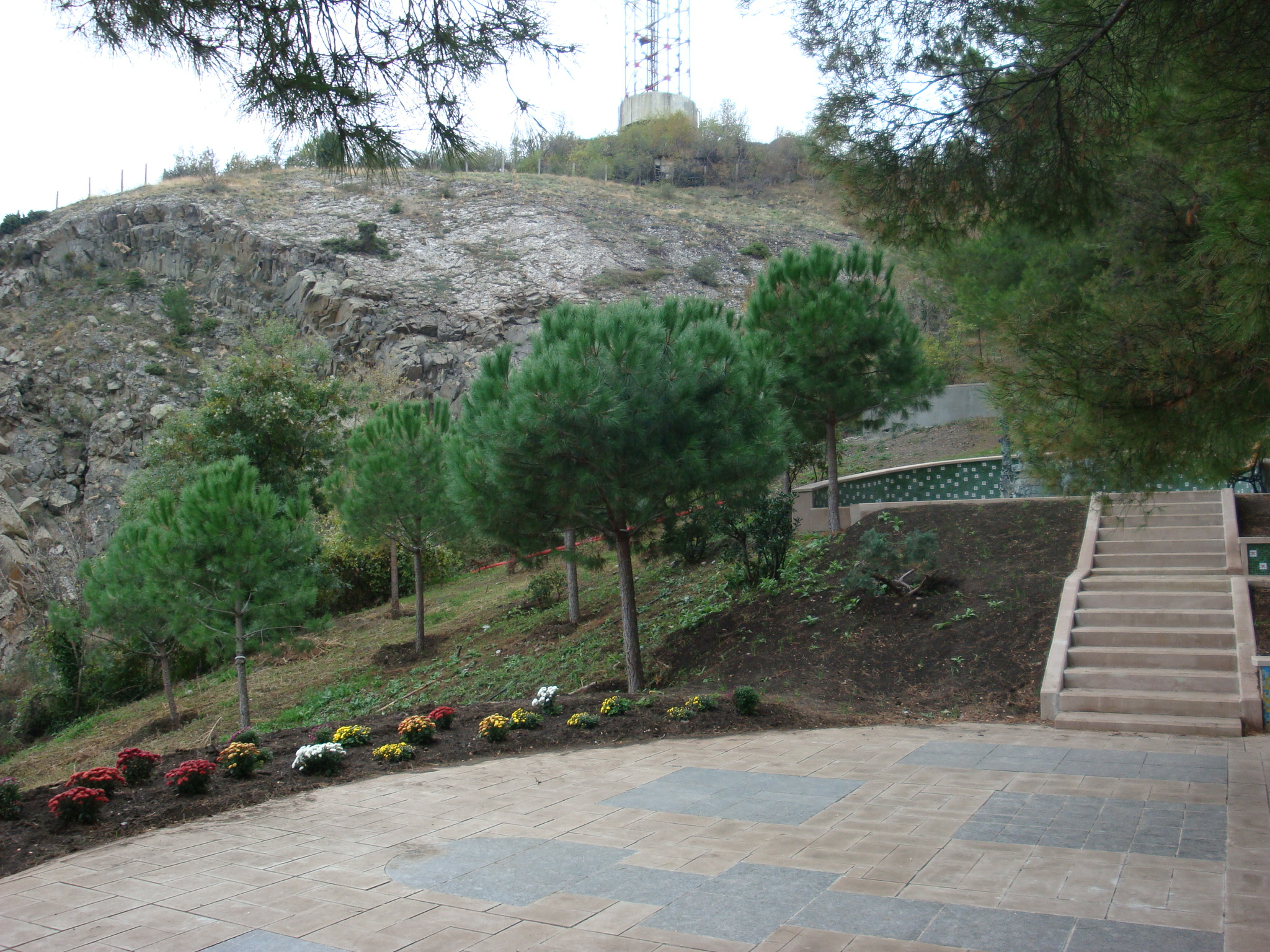
Grove of young stone pines

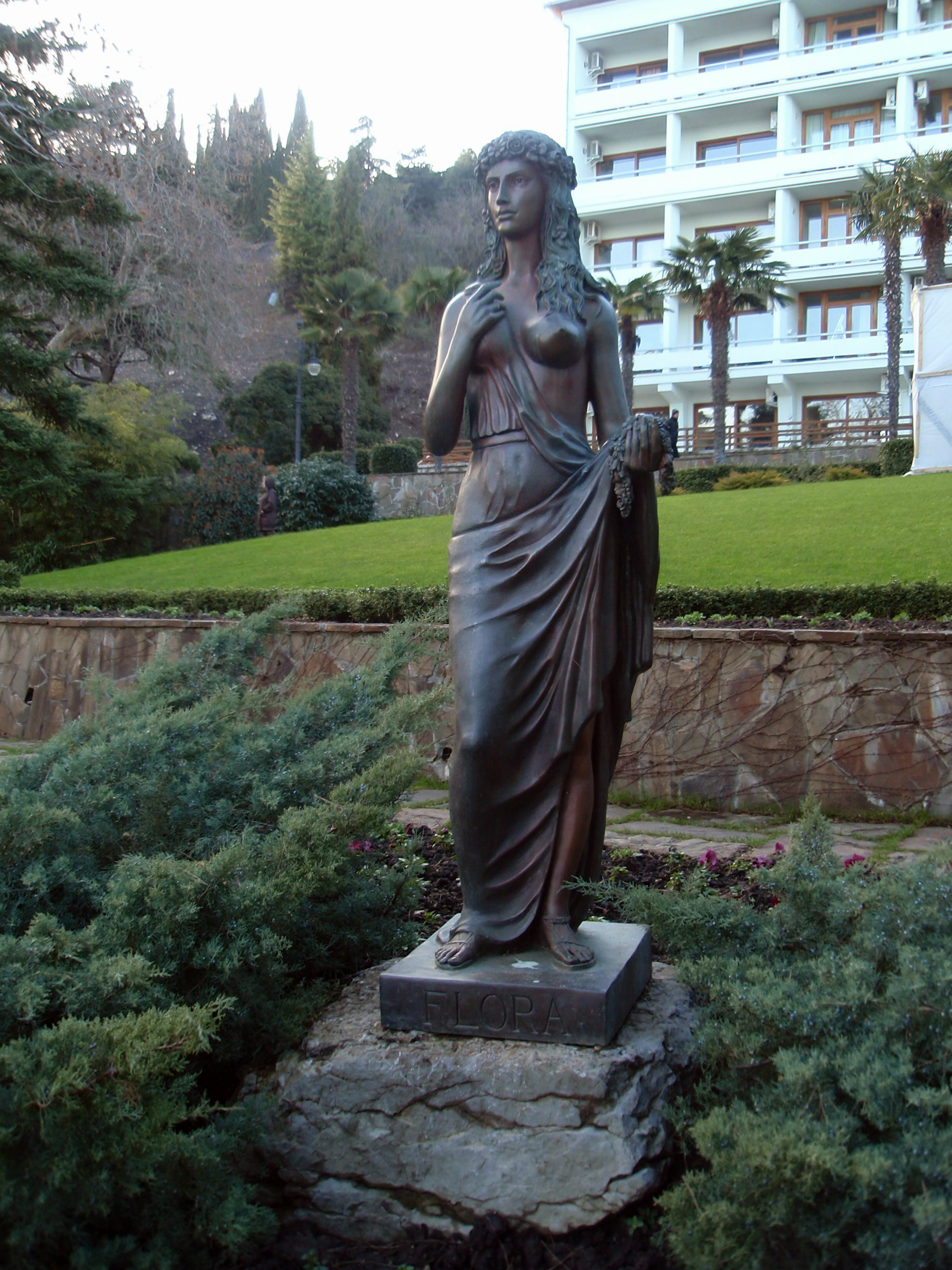
Ayvaz Park during winter

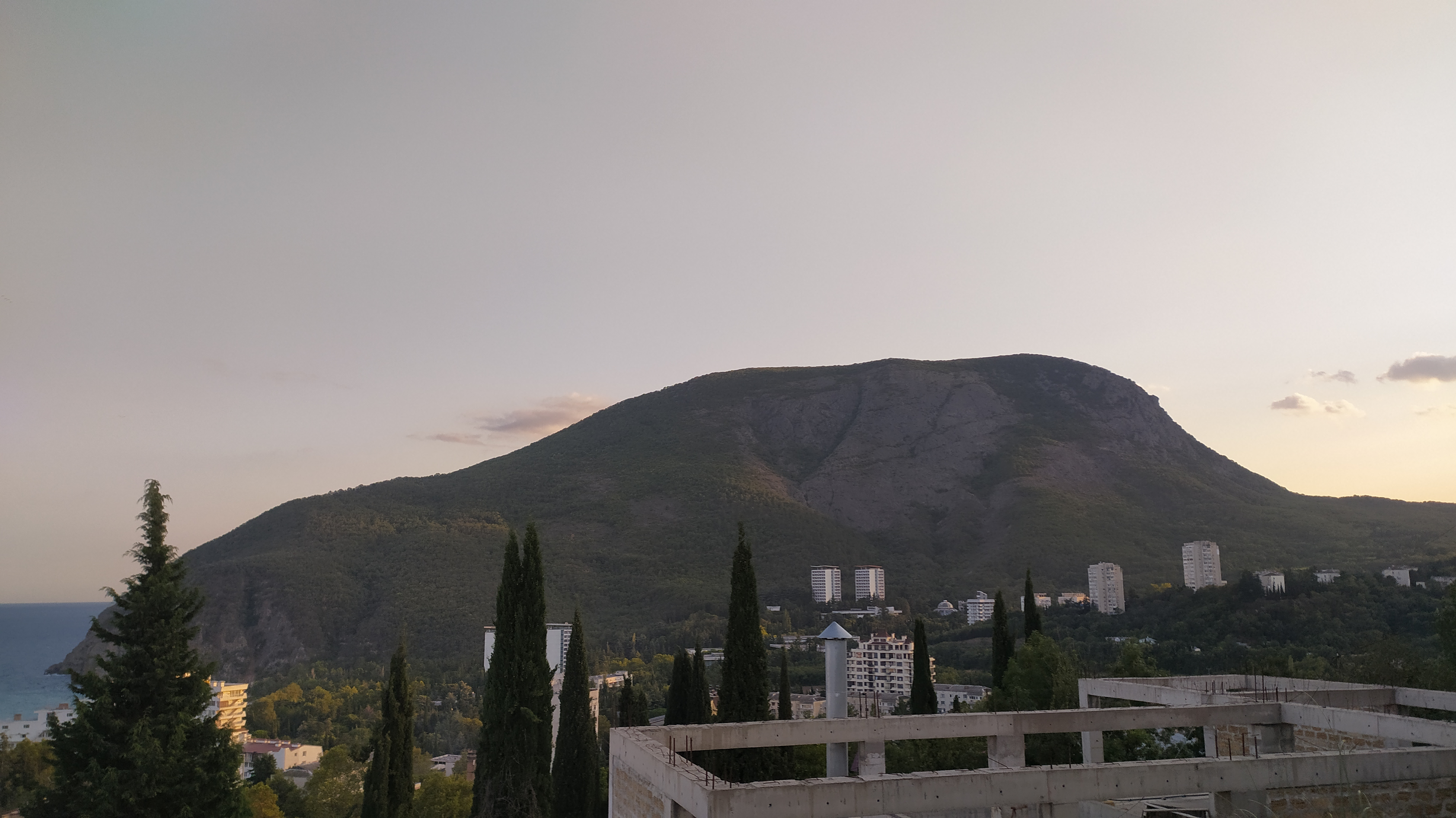
The Ayu-Dag is a famous landmark in the region

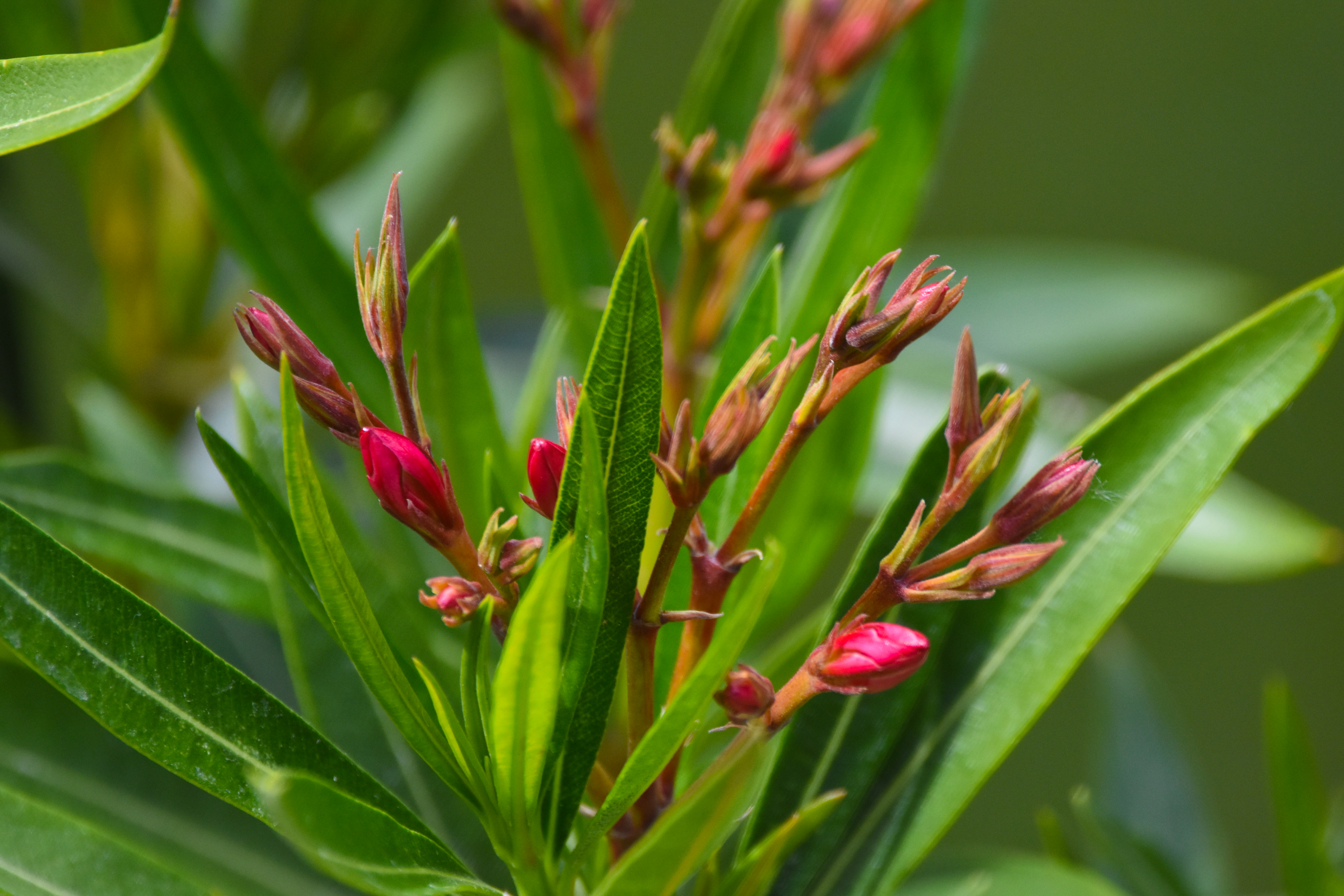
Oleander shrub in the city

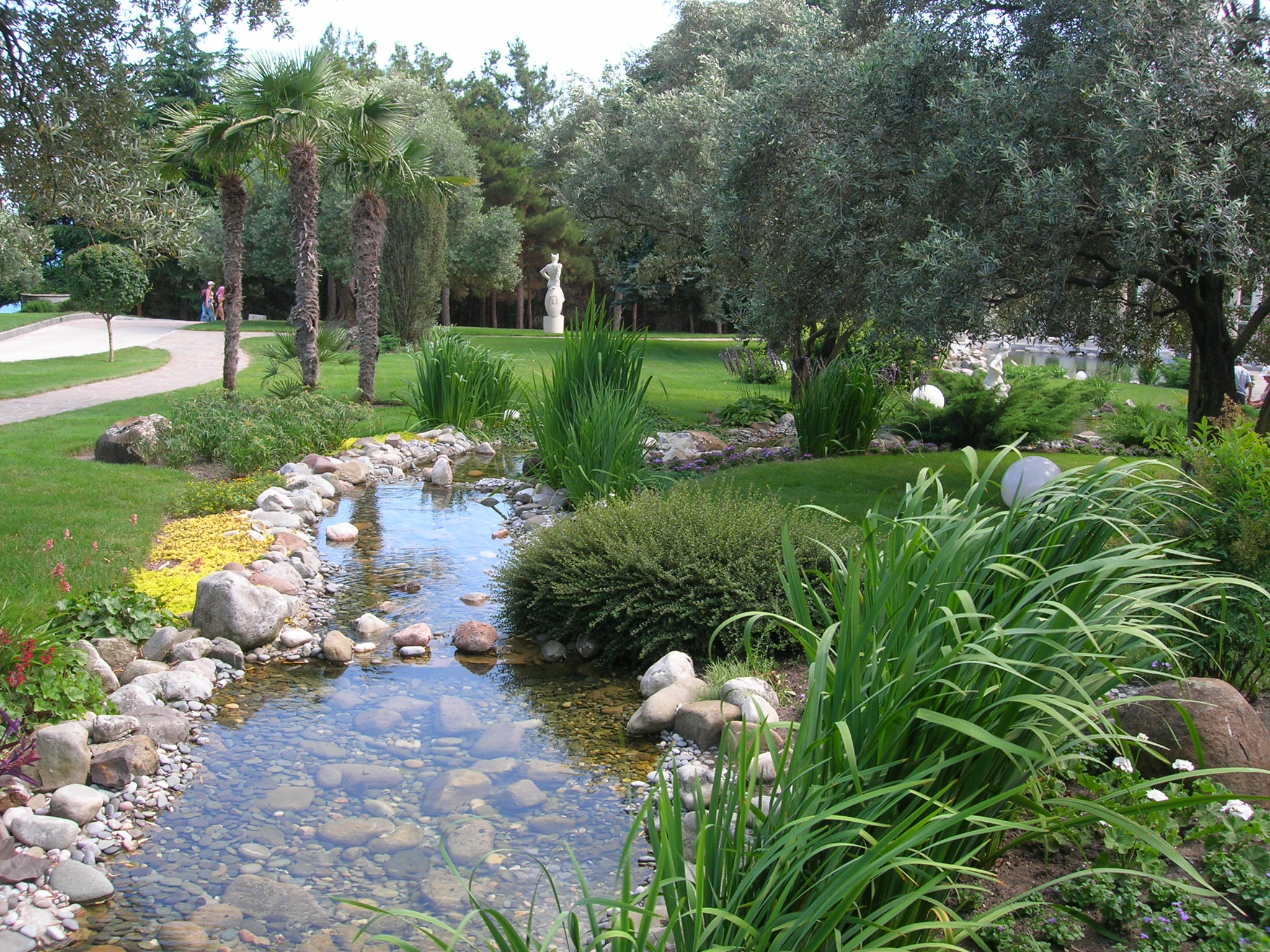
28 Old Olives
