= Crimean Goths =

Extinct Germanic ethnic group of Crimea

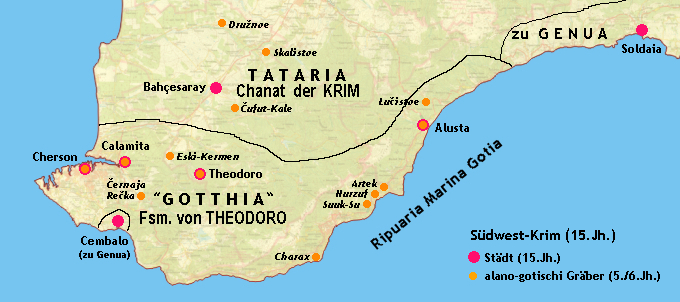
A map of Gothia, the territory of the Crimean Goths.

The Crimean Goths were a Germanic-speaking people that lived in the lands around the Black Sea, especially Crimea, between about the 3rd and 18th centuries. While the exact period when they ceased to exist as a distinct culture is unknown, they were the longest-lasting of the peoples known as Goths – a name applied to various tribes that may have had little or no connection to each other. Based on the limited historical and linguistic evidence, the Crimean Goths may have been connected to a preceding East Germanic tribe called the Greuthungi and/or a tribe speaking a West Germanic language.

Apart from textual reports of the existence of the Goths in Crimea, both first- and second-hand, from as early as 850, numerous archaeological sites also exist, including the ruins of the former capital city of the Crimean Goths: Doros (present-day Mangup). Furthermore, numerous articles of jewellery, weaponry, shields, buttons, pins, and small personal artefacts on display in museums in Crimea and in the British Museum have led to a better understanding of Crimean Gothia.

== Origins and identity ==
While most scholars believe that the Crimean Goths were originally an Ostrogothic people, others have suggested that they appear to have incorporated tribes speaking West Germanic (or even North Germanic) languages.

Ogier Ghiselin de Busbecq (1522–1592), a Holy Roman Empire envoy to the Ottoman Empire is one of the main sources on the Crimean Goths. In his Fourth Turkish letter, Busbecq reports that because the Crimean Gothic language does not strongly resemble the well-attested Gothic language, it is unclear whether it had its origins among the Goths per se or a West Germanic people, such as the Saxons.

== History ==
=== Early history ===
The existence of Goths in Crimea was first attested from around the 3rd century, when they were first reported.

According to Herwig Wolfram, following Jordanes, the Ostrogoths had a huge kingdom north of the Black Sea in the 4th century, which the Huns overwhelmed in the time of the Gothic king Ermanaric (or Hermanric; i.e. "king of noblemen" (Note: Here/Hari (army/noble) + mann/man + ric/rike (ruler)))) when the Huns migrated to the Ukrainian steppe.

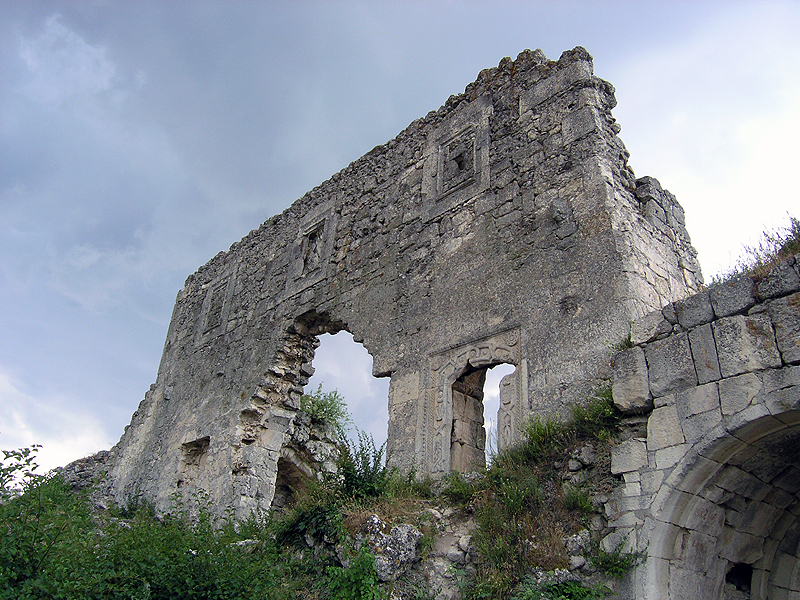
The modern-day ruins of Mangup (Doros), capital of the Crimean Goths

The Ostrogoths became vassals of the Huns until the death of Attila, when they revolted and regained independence. Like the Huns, the Goths in Crimea never regained their lost glory.

According to Peter Heather and Michael Kulikowski, the Ostrogoths did not even exist until the 5th century, when they emerged from other Gothic and non-Gothic groups. Other Gothic groups may have settled in Crimea.

In the late 5th century, the Ostrogothic-Roman ruler Theodoric the Great is known to have attempted, and failed, to recruit Crimean Goths to support his 488–493 war in Italy.

During the late 5th and early 6th century, the Crimean Goths had to fight off hordes of Huns who were migrating back eastward after losing control of their European empire.

Several inscriptions from the early 9th century found in a Crimea use the word "Goth" only as a personal name, not an ethnonym. However, that cannot necessarily be construed as evidence of a decline in use of the language, given the total absence of any early written records, from the Crimean Goths themselves.

=== Byzantium ===
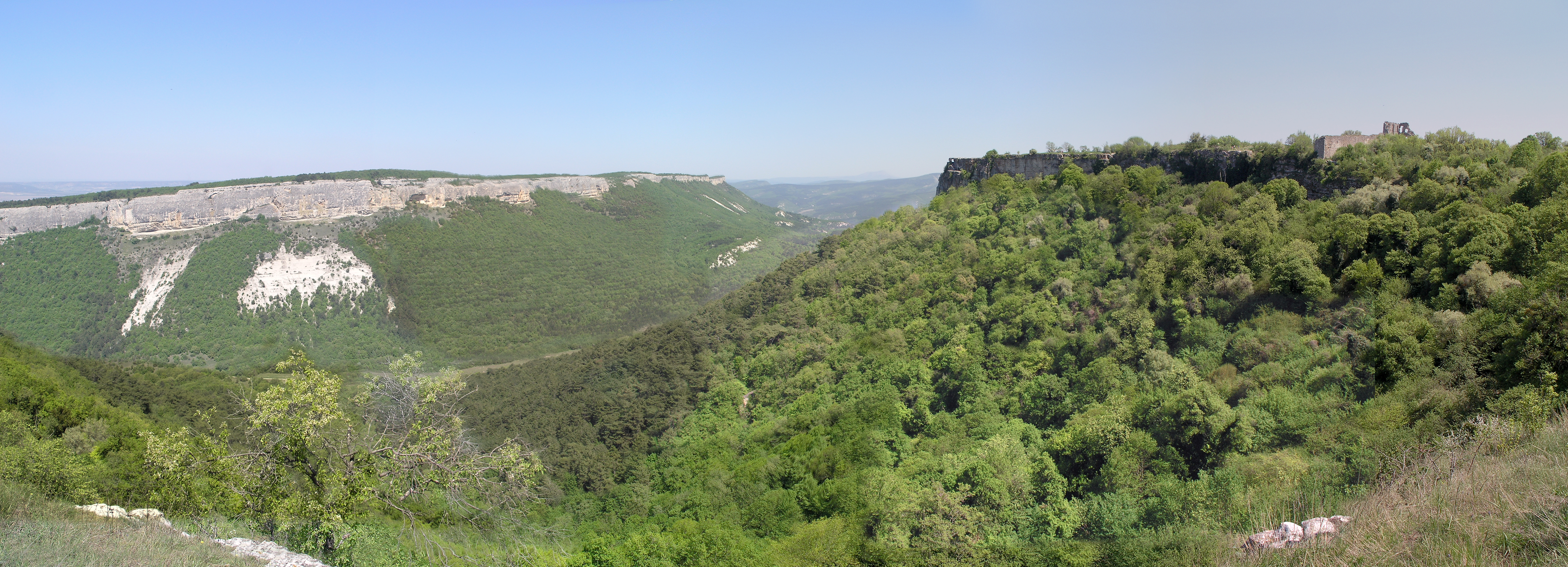
Mangup Kale is the biggest cavern fortress on the Crimean peninsula

The Principality of Gothia or Theodoro was formed after the Fourth Crusade out of parts of the Byzantine thema of Klimata that were not occupied by the Genoese. Its population was a mixture of Greeks, Crimean Goths, Alans, Bulgars, Kipchaks and other nations, which followed Orthodox Christianity. The principality's official language was Greek. The territory was initially under the control of Trebizond, and possibly part of its Crimean possessions, the Perateia.

Many Crimean Goths were Greek speakers and many non-Gothic Byzantine citizens were settled in the region called "Gothia" by the government in Constantinople. A Gothic principality around the stronghold of Doros (modern Mangup), the Principality of Theodoro, continued to exist through various periods of vassalage to the Byzantines, Khazars, Kipchaks, Mongols, Genoese and other empires until 1475, when it was finally incorporated in the Khanate of Crimea and the Ottoman Empire. This is generally considered to be the fall of the Crimean Goths.

The French bishop Jean Germain, writing in 1452, claims that the mamluks (slave soldiers of Egypt) were "commonly Picts and Goths [Pictes et Gethes], Greek Christians, conquered by the tricks of the Genoese." The confused reference to the Picts, however, renders the accuracy of the passage questionable.

=== Early modern era ===
By the mid-16th century, the existence of the Crimean Goths had become well-known to scholars in Western Europe. Many travellers visited Crimea and wrote about the Goths. One romantic report appears in Joachimus Cureus's Gentis Silesiae Annales (1571), in which he claims that, during a voyage in the Black Sea, his ship was forced ashore by storms. There, to his surprise, he found a man singing a song in which he used "German words". When he asked him where he was from, he answered "that his home was nearby and that his people were Goths". Another visitor, Georgius Torquatus (d. 1575) stated that while they spoke their own language, the Crimean Goths normally used Greek, Tatar or Hungarian when dealing with outsiders.

Ogier Ghiselin de Busbecq reported (1595) having had a conversation with two Goths in Constantinople. He also left the Gothic-Latin dictionary with about a hundred Germanic words that share some traits in common with the ancient Gothic language. Busbecq described them as "a warlike people, who to this day inhabit many villages".

In 1690, Engelbert Kaempfer stated:

The language spoke[n] in the Peninsula Crimea, or Taurica Chersonesus, in Asia, still retains many German words, brought thither, as is suppos'd, by a colony of Goths, who went to settle there about 850 years after the Deluge. The late Mr. Busbeq, who had been Imperial Ambassador at the Ottoman Port, collected and publish'd a great number of these words in his fourth letter; and in my own travels through that Country I took notice of many more.

== Religion ==
The first report of the Crimean Goths appears in the Vita of Saint Cyril, Apostle to the Slavs, who went to Crimea to preach the gospel to the Khazars (c. 850). He lists "Goths" as people who read and praised the Christian God "in their own language". In 1606, Joseph Justus Scaliger claimed that the Goths of Crimea read both the Old and New Testaments "in the letters of Wulfila's alphabet". These are the only two reports that refer to the existence of a written form of Crimean Gothic, but also confirm their Christian faith.

Gothic peoples originally practiced forms of Gothic paganism, a subset of Germanic paganism, before nominally being Christianised from the 4th to 6th centuries AD.

== Language ==
The language of the Crimean Goths is poorly attested, with only 101 certain independent forms surviving, few of which are phrases, and a three-line song, which has never been conclusively translated.

In 2015, five Gothic graffiti inscriptions were found by Andrey Vinogradov, a Russian historian, on stone plates excavated in Mangup in 1938, and deciphered by him and Maksim Korobov. The reading of these inscriptions was made difficult, because they were later overwritten by some Greek graffiti.

== Disappearance ==
There are numerous other sources referring to the existence of Goths in Crimea following Busbecq's report, though none provide details of their language or customs. The last known record of the Goths in Crimea comes from the Archbishop of Mohilev, Stanisław Bohusz Siestrzeńcewicz c. 1780, who visited Crimea at the end of the 18th century, and noted the existence of people whose language and customs differed greatly from their neighbours and who he concluded must be "Goths". The eviction of Christians from the Crimea in 1778 might have secured the downfall.

Though there are no further records of the language's existence since the late 18th century, communities of Germanic peoples with distinctly separate customs and physical features have been recorded living in Crimea, leading some to believe that the Gothic language may have survived as a haussprache (home language) until as late as 1945.

It is likely that the Goths had begun to speak Crimean Tatar and Crimean Greek from long before the arrival of Busbecq, thus they may well have integrated into the wider Crimean Tartar and Crimean Greek population, as later visitors to Mangup were unable to discover "any trace" of Gothic peoples.

== Legacy ==
Almost no signs of the Crimean Goths exist today. It was claimed by the Third Reich and by Adolf Hitler that the Crimean Goths had survived long enough to interbreed with later German settlers in Crimea and that the German communities in Crimea constituted native peoples of that area. Hitler had intended to resettle German people in Crimea and rename numerous towns with their previous Crimean Gothic names. During the Nazi occupation of Crimea following its capture in the Axis invasion of the Soviet Union, Sevastopol was changed to Theoderichshafen. Hitler's ultimate goal for his planned "Gau Gothenland" ("Gothland" or "Gothia") was to replace the local population with "pure Germans" and turn Crimea into what he described as "the German Gibraltar" — a national foothold not contiguous to the rest of Germany, similar to how Gibraltar was not contiguous to the rest of the United Kingdom – to be connected to Germany proper by an autobahn. The plan was postponed for the duration of the war, and it never went into effect due to the Soviet recapture of Crimea and Nazi Germany's eventual demise.

== See also ==
- Bastarnae
- Chernyakhov culture
- Crimea Germans
- Crimean Gothic
- Gothiscandza
- Gutasaga
- Haplogroup I-M438
- Herules
- History of Germans in Russia, Ukraine and the Soviet Union
- List of Germanic tribes
- Oium
- Ostrogoths
- Scandza
- Visigoths
- Wielbark culture

== Sources ==
- Bellamy, Chris (2008). Absolute War: Soviet Russia in the Second World War. Knopf Doubleday Publishing Group.
- Heather, Peter (1998). The Goths. Blackwell.
- Heather, Peter; Matthews, John (1991). Goths in the Fourth Century. Liverpool Univ. Press.
- Kulikowski, Michael (2006). Rome's Gothic Wars: From the Third Century to Alaric. Cambridge Univ. Press.
- Schäferdiek, Knut; Gschwantler, Otto (2010) [1975]. "Bekehrung und Bekehrungsgeschichte". Germanische Altertumskunde Online. pp. 350–409.
- Schwarz, Ernst (1951). Goten, Nordgermanen, Angelsachsen. Bern: A. Francke.
- Schwarz, Ernst (1953). "Die Krimgoten". Saeculum: Jahrbuch für Universalgeschichte. 4. Freiburg im Breisgau: Böhlau Verlag: 156–164.
- Shepard, Jonathan (1973). "The English and Byzantium: A Study of Their Role in the Byzantine Army in the Later Eleventh Century". Traditio: Studies in Ancient and Medieval History, Thought, and Religion. 29. New York: Fordham University Press: 53–92. JSTOR 27830955.
- Streitberg, Wilhelm (1920). Gotisches Elementarbuch (5th and 6th ed.). Heidelberg: Carl Winter's Universitätsbuchhandlung.
- Vasiliev, Aleksandr A. (1936). The Goths in the Crimea. Cambridge, MA: The Mediaeval Academy of America.
- Wolfram, Herwig (1988) [Originally published in German, 1980]. History of the Goths. Translated by Dunlap, Thomas J. Univ. of California Press.
- Wolfram, Herwig (2001). Die Goten und ihre Geschichte. C.H. Beck.
