= Ayu-Dag =

Summit in Crimea

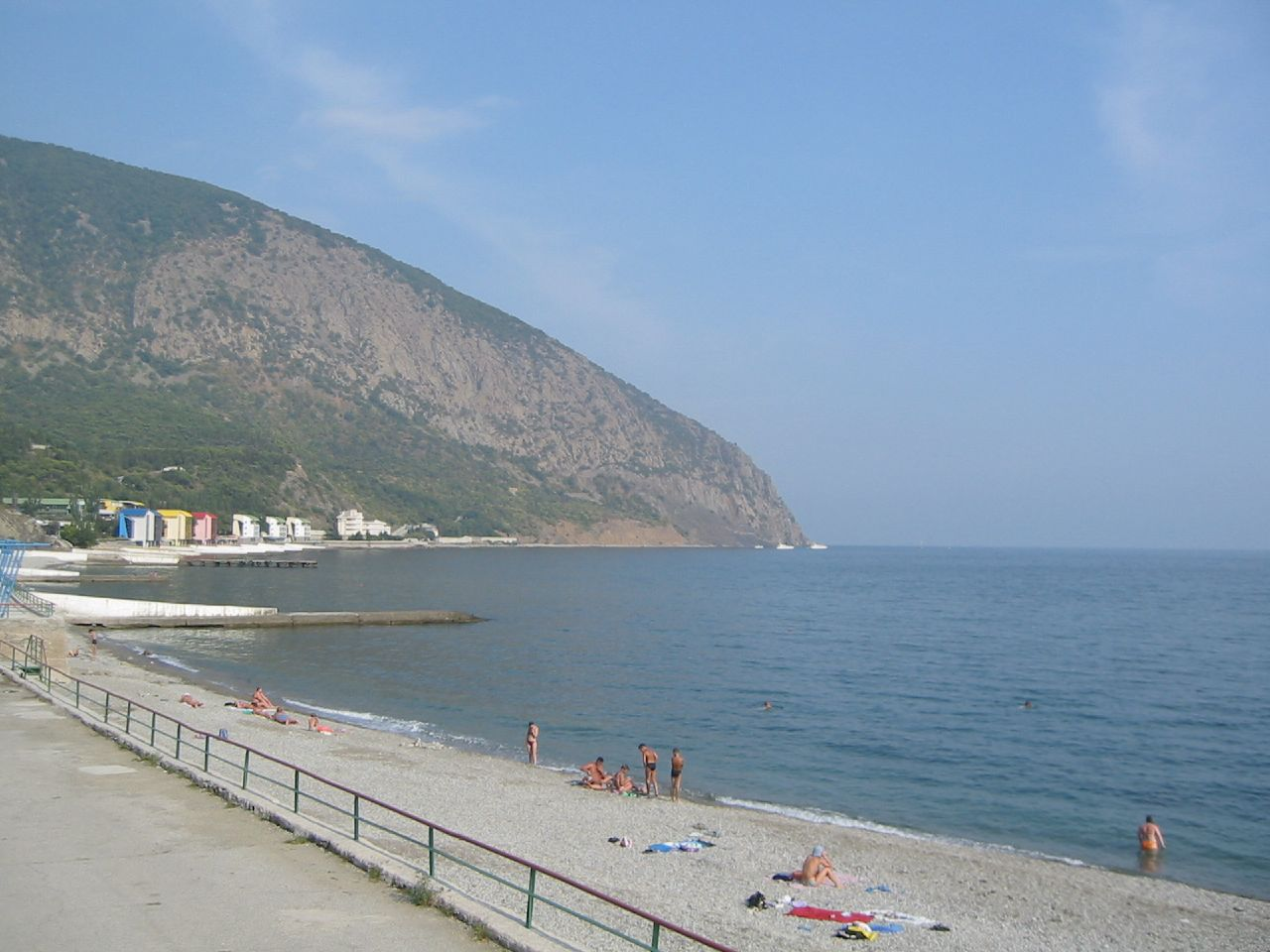
- Ayu-Dag. View from Artek's beach

Highest point
- Elevation: 572 m (1,877 ft)
- Coordinates: 44°33′N 34°20′E

Geography
- Location: Crimea
- Parent range: Crimean Mountains

Ayu-Dag (Crimean Tatar: Ayuv Dağ; Ukrainian: Аю-Даг; Russian: Аю-Даг; Greek: Αγια, lit. 'Holy Mountain') is a summit of Crimea. It is also known under the Russified name Medved'-gora (Bear mountain) (Ukrainian: Ведмідь-гора, Russian: Медведь-гора). The summit is located 16 km north-east from Yalta between the towns of Gurzuf and Partenit.

Its Ancient Greek name was Κριοῦ μέτωπον (Kriou Metopon), meaning Ram's Head. The Slavic language variants of the mountain's name are translations from the Crimean Tatar name and mean Bear Mountain ("bear"- ведмідь in Ukrainian, медведь in Russian, ayuv in Crimean Tatar; "mountain"-гора in Ukrainian and Russian, dağ in Crimean Tatar).

The mountain is a laccolith. Today its territory is a Nature reserve (5.5 km^{2}). There is a pioneer children's camp Artek near Ayu-Dag which is well known internationally. The eastern slopes of Ayu-Dag lead to an ancient settlement Partenit.

Remains of an early-medieval settlement and a number of churches were discovered here. In the 9th-10th centuries it was a well-known seaport, bound with cities of the Byzantine Empire. The western slopes lead to Artek.
