= Wielbark =

Wielbark may refer to:

- Wielbark culture, part of an Iron Age archaeological complex in northern Europe
- Wielbark, Pomeranian Voivodeship, a village in northern Poland
- Wielbark, Warmian-Masurian Voivodeship, a town in north-east Poland
  - Gmina Wielbark, a rural administrative district in Warmian-Masurian Voivodeship

== See also ==
- Vidivarii, archeological culture related to Wielbark culture
- Willenberg (disambiguation)
