= Willenberg =

Willenberg may refer to:

- Samuel Willenberg (1923–2016), Polish-Israeli sculptor and Holocaust survivor
- Jan Willenberg (1571–1613), author of woodcuts, prints and drawings active in Moravia and Bohemia.

== Places ==
- Willenberg culture, an Iron Age archaeological complex in northern Europe
- Wielbark, Pomeranian Voivodeship (German: Willenberg), a village in northern Poland
- Wielbark, Warmian-Masurian Voivodeship (German: Willenberg), a village in north-east Poland
- Willenburg, a ruined castle in Germany

== See also ==
- Wielbark (disambiguation)
