= Gadaric =

Gadaric was a legendary king of the Goths. He is only mentioned twice in Getica by Jordanes. He is supposed to have been the fourth king after Berig, who ruled in Gothiscandza. His son Filimer is said to have let the Goths south. The historicity of Getica, to which this narrative belongs, is however controversial.

== Sources ==
- Wolfram, Herwig (1990). History of the Goths. University of California Press. ISBN 0520069838.
