= Ostrogotha =

3rd century leader of the eastern Goths

Ostrogotha was a leader of the Goths in Ukraine, who invaded Roman Moesia during the Crisis of the Third Century. He was a contemporary of Cniva, who also led Gothic armies in the same period.

He was mentioned by the 6th-century historian Jordanes in his history of the Goths. Cassiodorus, who Jordanes reported to be the main source upon which he based his own work, also mentioned Ostrogotha as one of the ancestors of Amalasuintha and her father, Theoderic the Great.

Jordanes' account differs with those of Zosimus and Joannes Zonaras, who do not mention Ostrogotha, and therefore his existence was questioned. However, the discovery of lost fragments of the Sythica of Dexippus give confirmation to his existence.

== Jordanes ==
=== Ancestry ===
According to Jordanes, Ostrogotha was part of the Amal dynasty, who the early Goths supposedly treated as gods. In the genealogy he recited, the family was named after his grandfather, who was named Amal. Jordanes also reported Ostrogotha to be an ancestor of Ermanaric and, through a brother of Ermanaric, Theodoric the Great.

Cassiodorus similarly mentioned him as an ancestor of the Ostrogothic king of Italy, Theoderic, when praising his daughter Amalasuintha:

hanc si parentum cohors illa regalis aspiceret, tamquam in speculum purissimum sua praeconia mox videret. enituit enim Hamalus felicitate, Ostrogotha patientia, Athala mansuetudine, VVinitarius aequitate, Unimundus forma, Thorismuth castitate, VValamer fide, Theudimer pietate, sapientia, ut iam vidistis, inclitus pater	If that royal band of ancestors were to behold this, they would at once see their own praises as if in the clearest mirror. For Hamalus [Amal] shone in good fortune, Ostrogotha in patience, Athala in gentleness, Winitarius in fairness, Unimundus in beauty, Thorismuth in chastity, Valamer in fidelity, Theudimer in piety—and in wisdom, as you have already seen, the illustrious father [Theoderic].

=== History ===
Jordanes cited Ablabius the historian as saying that in Scythia, the Goths were dwelling above an arm of the Pontic Sea (the Black Sea), and "the part of them who held the eastern region and whose king was Ostrogotha, were called Ostrogoths, that is, eastern Goths, either from his name or from the place. But the rest were called Visigoths, that is, the Goths of the western country".

Jordanes reported that during the reign of Philip the Arab (reigned 244–248), the Goths under Ostrogotha held "undisputed sway over great stretches of country, many arms of the sea and many river courses". They defeated the Vandals, the Marcomanni had to pay tribute to them, and the princes of the Quadi "were reduced to slavery". Even the Romans paid tribute, and Philip withheld this tribute the Goths were enraged and Ostrogotha crossed the Danube, when . Ostrogotha successfully invaded the Roman provinces of Moesia and Thrace.

Philip sent a senator Decius, who would later be emperor (reigned 249–251), but "since he could do nothing against the Getae [Goths], he released his soldiers from military service and sent them back to private life, as though it had been by their neglect that the Goths had crossed the Danube. When, as he supposed, he had thus taken vengeance on his soldiers, he returned to Philip." The Roman forces "in their anger" joined Ostrogotha, and he received them and led a force of 300,000 men against Rome, with Taifali, Astringi, Carpi, and both Goths and Peucini from the island of Peuce, which in the mouths of the Danube. The forces were led by two Gothic nobles, Argaithus and Guntheric, and they devastated Moesia a second time and then besieged Marcianople, and returned with a large amount of money received in ransom.

Ostrogotha also fended off a challenge from the kinsfolk of the Goths, the Gepids, under the leadership of their king Fastida.

For he sent ambassadors to Ostrogotha, to whose rule Ostrogoths and Visigoths alike, that is, the two peoples of the same tribe, were still subject. Complaining that he was hemmed in by rugged mountains and dense forests, he demanded one of two things,--that Ostrogotha should either prepare for war or give up part of his lands to them. Then Ostrogotha, king of the Goths, who was a man of firm mind, answered the ambassadors that he did indeed dread such a war and that it would be a grievous and infamous thing to join battle with their kin,--but he would not give up his lands. And why say more? The Gepidae hastened to take arms and Ostrogotha likewise moved his forces against them, lest he should seem a coward. They met at the town of Galtis, near which the river Auha flows, and there both sides fought with great valor; indeed the similarity of their arms and of their manner of fighting turned them against their own men. But the better cause and their natural alertness aided the Goths. Finally night put an end to the battle as a part of the Gepidae were giving way. Then Fastida, king of the Gepidae, left the field of slaughter and hastened to his own land, as much humiliated with shame and disgrace as formerly he had been elated with pride. The Goths returned victorious, content with the retreat of the Gepidae, and dwelt in peace and happiness in their own land so long as Ostrogotha was their leader. (XVII 98-100)

Jordanes introduces Cniva into his account only after the death of Ostrogotha, describing him as the new ruler of the Goths. This conflicts with the information now available from the Dexippus fragment.

== Dexippus ==
In the Vienna fragment of Dexippus, Cniva and Ostrogotha are contemporaries and competitors. Ostrogotha was still alive when Cniva conquered Philippopolis and Ostrogotha was jealous of the high regard Cniva was given because of this victory. He set out to battle the Roman leader Decius and was apparently the Gothic leader responsible for the defeat of Decius (which is also reported by Jordanes as happening after Phillipopolis).

But when Ostrogouthos, the leader of the Scythians, heard that Philippopolis was taken, and that (?) indeed the Scythians were holding Cniva in the highest regard, and were celebrating him in song, as is their ancestral custom when they have especially good fortune and success in war, whereas they were holding himself [in less esteem], charging him with cowardice and failure in his tactics, he thought it unbearable not to make amends to the Scythian cause by some notable achievement, setting out, he marched quickly with an army of about fifty thousand. But Decius was grieved by <his> failure to bring help and by the capture of Philip (194v) popolis, and when the army was collected to the number of about eighty thousand, his intention was to renew the war if he could, thinking that even if he had failed to bring help, the honorable (course) was at least to set free the Thracian captives and to prevent them from crossing to the other side [of the Danube]. And having in the meanwhile made a ditch near Amisos (?), a village of the territory of Beroea, he remained within the stockade with his army, keeping awatch for when the enemy might (try to) cross. But when the advance of the force under Ostrogouthos was reported to him, he decided it was necessary to encourage the soldiers as the opportunity offered, and after calling them together in assembly he said something like this: If only, (my) men, the body of the army and our subject to us had been successful. But since the vicissitudes of humanity bring many calamities, as is the rule for mortals, it is perhaps the duty of wise men to accept events and not to be less brave in disposition, and not, because (you are) shaken by the failure in the plain and the capture of the Thracians (in case any of you has lost heart because of these events), to become cowards. For both setbacks can be disputed [i.e. can be explained away]. For the first was due to the treachery of the sentinels rather than to cowardice on our part, and they took the Thracians city, after despairing of doing so by direct attack, by treachery rather than by valor. But weakness is not courage (?)

Cniva was described as a king (βασιλεύς) while Ostrogotha was described as an archon or leader of Scythians (τῶν Σκυθῶν ἄρχων).

== Sources ==
- Jones, Christopher P., Further Dexippus (2). An update on the new Vienna fragments of Dexippus, translated by Jones, Christopher P
- Boteva, Dilyana (2020), "Some Considerations Related to the Scythica Vindobonensia", in Mitthof, Fritz; Martin, Gunther; Grusková, Jana (eds.), Empire in Crisis: Gothic Invasions and Roman Historiography. Beiträge einer internationalen Tagung zu den Wiener Dexipp-Fragmenten (Dexippus Vindobonensis). Wien, 3.–6. Mai 2017, Holzhausen, ISBN 9783903207387
- Potter, David (2020), "Dexippus' Gothic Anthropology", in Mitthof, Fritz; Martin, Gunther; Grusková, Jana (eds.), Empire in Crisis: Gothic Invasions and Roman Historiography. Beiträge einer internationalen Tagung zu den Wiener Dexipp-Fragmenten (Dexippus Vindobonensis). Wien, 3.–6. Mai 2017, Holzhausen, ISBN 9783903207387
- Wolfram, Herwig (2020), "Ostrogotha — ansischer Amaler oder glückloser Feigling", in Mitthof, Fritz; Martin, Gunther; Grusková, Jana (eds.), Empire in Crisis: Gothic Invasions and Roman Historiography. Beiträge einer internationalen Tagung zu den Wiener Dexipp-Fragmenten (Dexippus Vindobonensis). Wien, 3.–6. Mai 2017, Holzhausen, pp. 17–34, ISBN 9783903207387

== See also ==
- Thomas Gerhardt, Udo Hartmann: Fasti. In: Klaus-Peter Johne (Hrsg.): Die Zeit der Soldatenkaiser. Band 2. Akademie Verlag, Berlin 2008, S. 1194f.
- Jana Grusková, Gunter Martin: Ein neues Textstück aus den „Scythica Vindobonensia“ zu den Ereignissen nach der Eroberung von Philippopolis. In: Tyche 29, 2014, S. 29–43.
- Jana Grusková, Gunter Martin: Zum Angriff der Goten unter Kniva auf eine thrakische Stadt (Scythica Vindobonensia, f. 195v). In: Tyche 30, 2015, S. 35–53
