= Oium =

Gothic area of Scythia in modern Ukraine

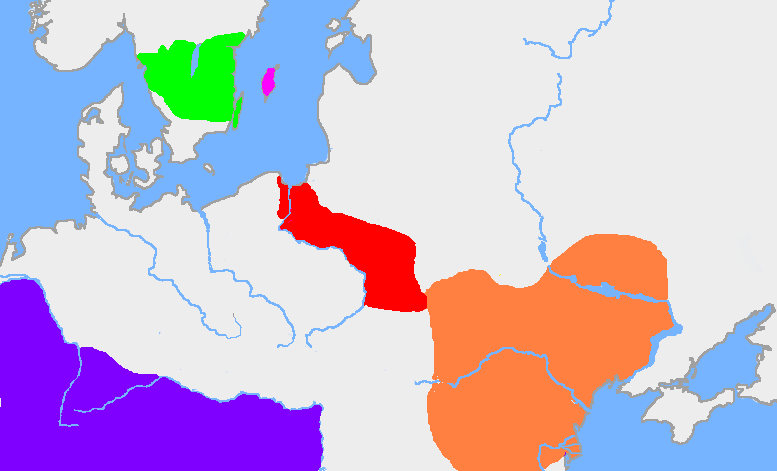
Land of the Geats (Götaland) Gotland Wielbark culture in the early 3rd century Chernyakhov culture in the early 4th century Roman Empire

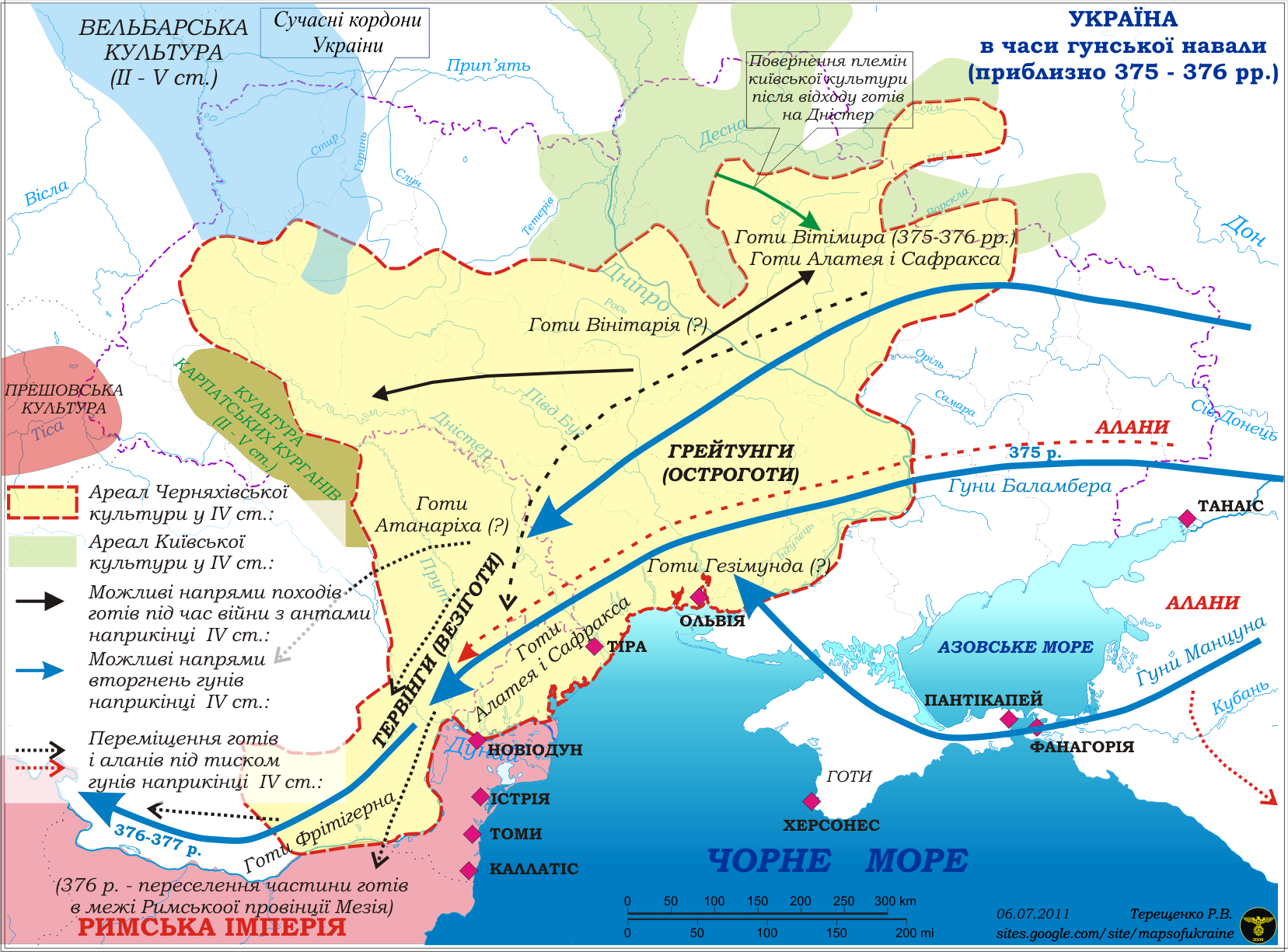
Chernyakhov culture, 4th c.

Oium was a name for Scythia, or a fertile part of it, roughly in modern Ukraine, where the Goths, under a legendary King Filimer, settled after leaving Gothiscandza, according to the Getica by Jordanes, written around 551.

It is generally assumed that the story reproduced by Jordanes contains a historical core, although several scholars have suggested that parts of it are fictional.

== Name etymology ==
Jordanes does not give an etymology, but many scholars interpret this word as a dative plural to a noun, widespread in the Germanic languages, whose Proto-Germanic reconstruction is *awjō and which means 'well-watered meadow' or 'island'. (The same noun is also found in Scatinauia, the Latinised name of an island in Northern Europe mentioned in Pliny the Elder's Naturalis historia, from which the names of Scandinavia and Scania originate.) This noun is generally derived from the Proto-Germanic word *ahwō 'water; stream, river' (whence Gothic aƕa 'river'), which is cognate with Latin aqua 'water'. This is seen as consistent with the description Jordanes gave of the Goths' delight in this region's fertility.

As mentioned for example by Dennis H. Green, Jordanes describes another place with a similar name — the place where the Goths' relatives the Gepids lived:

XVII (96) These Gepidae were then smitten by envy while they dwelt in the province of Spesis on an island surrounded by the shallow waters of the Vistula. This island they called, in the speech of their fathers, Gepedoios [emphasis added]; but it is now [in the 6th century] inhabited by the race of the Vividarii, since the Gepidae themselves have moved to better lands. The Vividarii are gathered from various races into this one asylum, if I may call it so, and thus they form a nation.

== Chronology ==
A problem with Jordanes' account is that he dates the arrival of the Goths in Oium well before 1000 BCE (approximately 5 generations after 1490). Historians who accept Jordanes' account as partially reflecting real events do not accept this aspect.

== Jordanes ==
Mierow's translation of the one short passage in Getica IV, which mentions Oium is as follows:

[...] But when the number of the people increased greatly and Filimer, son of Gadaric, reigned as king — about the fifth since Berig — he decided that the army of the Goths with their families should move from that region.
(27) In search of suitable homes and pleasant places they came to the land of Scythia, called Oium in that tongue. Here they were delighted with the great richness of the country, and it is said that when half the army had been brought over, the bridge whereby they had crossed the river fell in utter ruin, nor could anyone thereafter pass to or fro.
For the place is said to be surrounded by quaking bogs and an encircling abyss, so that by this double obstacle nature has made it inaccessible. And even to-day one may hear in that neighborhood the lowing of cattle and may find traces of men, if we are to believe the stories of travellers, although we must grant that they hear these things from afar.
(28) This part of the Goths, which is said to have crossed the river and entered with Filimer into the country of Oium, came into possession of the desired land, and there they soon came upon the race [gens] of the Spali, joined battle with them and won the victory. Thence the victors hastened to the farthest part of Scythia, which is near the sea of Pontus; for so the story is generally told in their early songs, in almost historic fashion. Ablabius also, a famous chronicler of the Gothic race, confirms this in his most trustworthy account.
(29) Some of the ancient writers also agree with the tale. [...]

The place where they first arrived is thus described not as the whole of Scythia, which Jordanes describes in the subsequent chapter (V), but a remote and isolated part of it, where the Spali lived. The Goths coming from the Baltic crossed a bridge to get there, but when it broke, it became impossible to cross back and forth anymore. Returning to his narrative, Jordanes subsequently described Filimer moving his people near the Sea of Azov, noting that there are verbal legends around about Gothic origins, but that he prefers to trust what he reads:

(38) We read that on their first migration the Goths dwelt in the land of Scythia near Lake Maeotis [the Sea of Azov; in Latin it is a marsh, not a sea or lake: paludem Meotidem]. On the second migration they went to Moesia, Thrace and Dacia, and after their third they dwelt again in Scythia, above the Sea of Pontus.
[...]
Of course if anyone in our city says that the Goths had an origin different from that I have related, let him object. For myself, I prefer to believe what I have read, rather than put trust in old wives' tales.
(39) To return, then, to my subject. The aforesaid race of which I speak is known to have had Filimer as king while they remained in their first home in Scythia near Maeotis. In their second home, that is in the countries of Dacia, Thrace and Moesia, Zalmoxes reigned, whom many writers of annals mention as a man of remarkable learning in philosophy.

According to Jordanes, the Goths left Oium in a second migration to Moesia, Dacia and Thrace, but they eventually returned, settling north of the Black Sea. Upon their return, they were divided under two ruling dynasties. The Visigoths were ruled by the Balþi and the Ostrogoths by the Amali.

== The identified places ==
Jordanes himself understands Oium to be near the Sea of Azov, which was understood to be a marshy area in this period. Wolfram (p. 42) for example interprets Jordanes in a straightforward way to be referring to a place on the shore of the Sea of Azov.

The Reallexikon der germanischen Altertumskunde (RGA) article on Oium, for example, proposes, based upon a proposal by Herwig Wolfram, that the uncrossable river with a broken bridge might be the Dnieper. The bridge story itself can not be taken literally as bridges crossing major rivers were not known in this area more than 1000 years BCE. It can therefore only refer to events in a much later period. Both Herwig Wolfram and Walter Goffart see the bridge story as likely to be symbolic.

Based upon a proposal by Norbert Wagner, the RGA suggests that the marshes surrounding Oium could be the Pripyat or Rokitno marshes in the area of the modern border of Belarus and Ukraine. This is to the west of the Dnieper, and not near Southern Russia where Wagner believed Oium was, and so Wagner saw this area, which contains the Pripyat River, as representing the "river" which needed to be crossed en route to Oium.

== Jordanes' sources ==
As explained above, Jordanes represented his story as being consistent with history-like Gothic songs, and the lost work of Ablabius. He also specifically expressed his preference for written sources in defending this Oium account against legends he had encountered in Constantinople. Concerning the larger work where this story appears, the Getica, Jordanes also explained in his prefaces to it and his other surviving work, the Romana, that he had started the work with the aim of summarizing a far larger work written by Cassiodorus, which has not survived.

According to some historians, Jordanes' account of the Goths' history in Oium was constructed from his reading of earlier classical accounts and from oral tradition. According to other historians, Jordanes' narrative has little relation to Cassiodorus's, no relation to oral traditions and little relation to actual history.

== Archaeology ==
Historians such as Peter Heather, Walter Goffart, Patrick Geary, A. S. Christensen and Michael Kulikowski have criticized the use of the Getica as a source for details about real Gothic origins.

Archaeologically, the Chernyakhov culture, which is also called the Sântana de Mureș culture, contained parts of Ukraine, Moldova and Romania and corresponds with the extent of Gothic-influenced Scythia as known from 3rd and 4th century contemporaries.

For archaeologists who subscribe to the proposal that Jordanes' account of migration from the Vistula can be seen in archaeological evidence, the Vistula archaeological culture which is proposed to represent the earlier Goths is the Wielbark culture. The account of Jordanes fits with the interpretation of the Wielbark and Chernyakhov cultures, in which Germanic peoples from the Vistula Basin, moved towards, influenced, and began to culturally dominate, peoples in Ukraine. Some of the historians who agree with this scenario, such as Herwig Wolfram, propose that this did not require significant amounts of people to move.

== Norse mythology ==
In The origin of Rus', Omeljan Pritsak connects the Hervarar saga with its account of Gothic legendary history and of battles with the Huns, with historical place names in Ukraine from 150 to 450 AD, This places the Goths' capital Árheimar, on the river Dniepr (Danpar). The connection to Oium was made by both Heinzel and Schütte. However the attribution of places, people, and events in the saga is confused and uncertain, with multiple scholarly views on who, where, and what real things the legend refers to.

== See also ==
- Ermanaric
- Crimean Gothic
