= Chernyakhov culture =

Archaeological culture in eastern Europe

Invasions of the Roman Empire
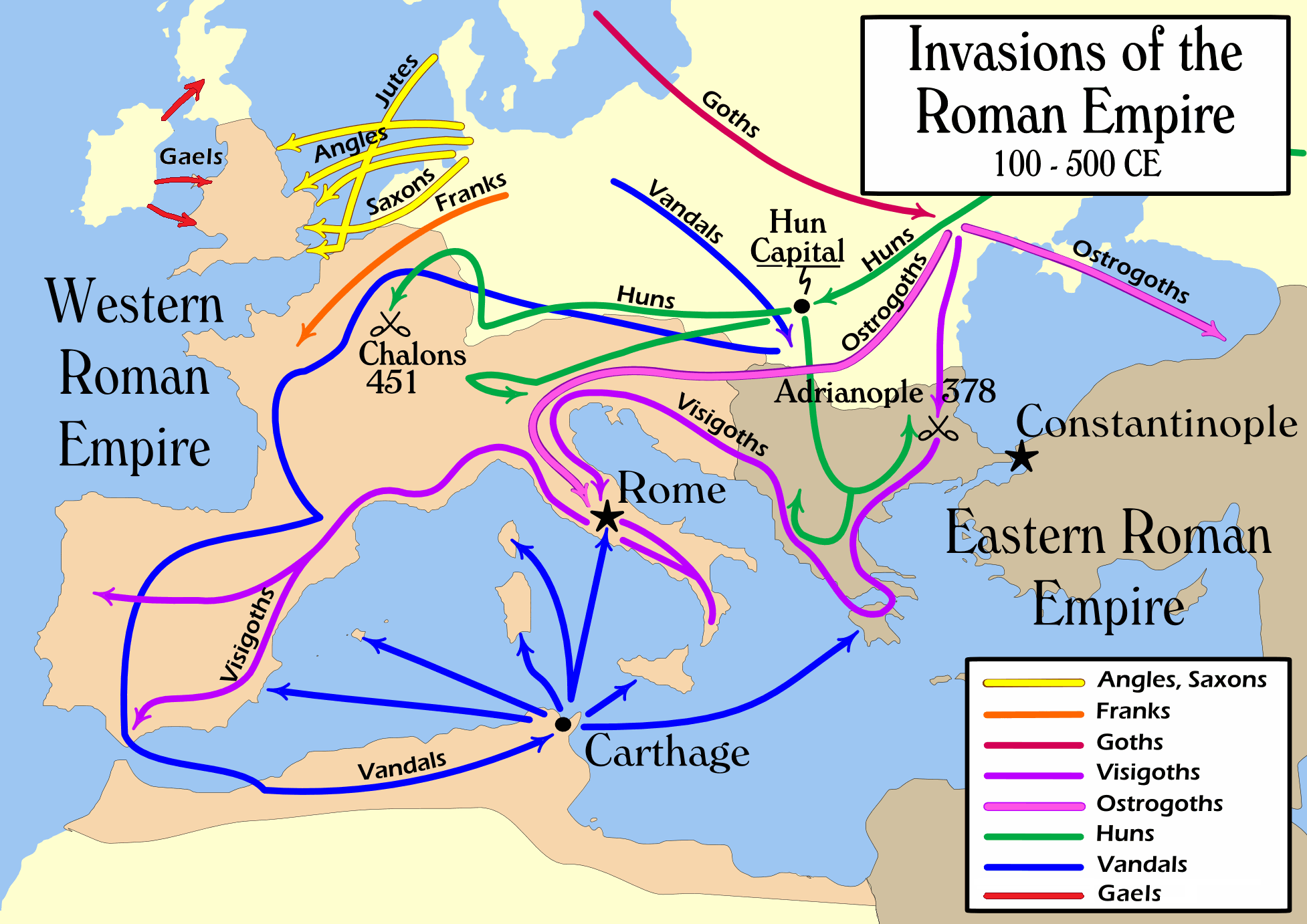
- Time: 300–800 AD (greatest estimate)
- Place: Europe and the Mediterranean region
- Event: Tribes invading the declining Roman Empire

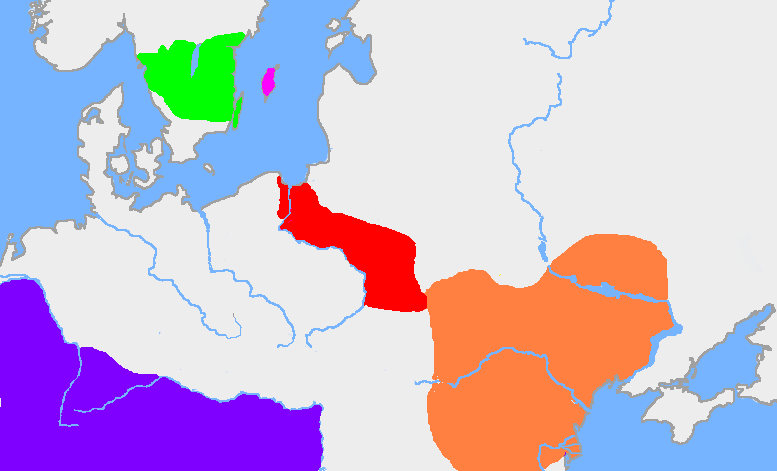
Land of the Geats (Götaland) Gotland Wielbark culture in the early 3rd century Chernyakhov culture in the early 4th century Roman Empire

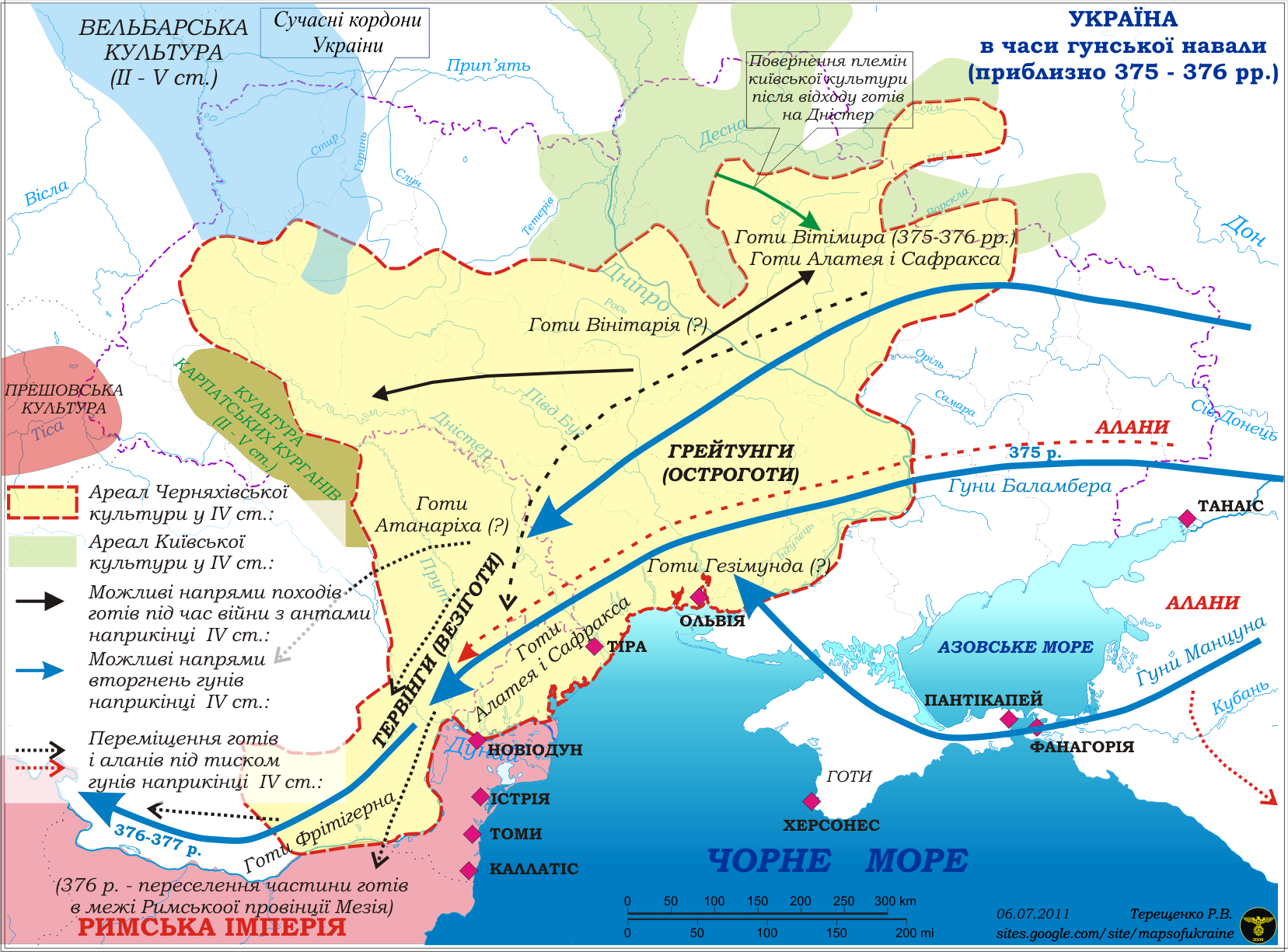
Chernyakhov culture, 4th c.

The Chernyakhov culture, Cherniakhiv culture or Sântana de Mureș—Chernyakhov culture was an archaeological culture that flourished between the 2nd and 5th centuries AD in a wide area of Eastern Europe, specifically in what is now Ukraine, Romania, Moldova and parts of Belarus. The culture is thought to be the result of a multiethnic cultural mix of the Gothic, Geto-Dacian, and Sarmatian populations in the area at that time. Until important methodological advances were made, the association of this Chernyakhov culture with the Goths was highly contentious.

The Chernyakhov culture territorially replaced its predecessor, the Zarubintsy culture. Both cultures were discovered by the Czech-Ukrainian archaeologist Vikentiy Khvoyka, who conducted numerous excavations around Kyiv and its vicinity. With the invasion of Huns, the culture declined and was replaced with the Penkovka culture (or the culture of the Antes).

Similarities have been noted between the Chernyakhov culture and the Wielbark culture, which was located closer to the Baltic Sea.

== Location and nomenclature ==
The Chernyakhov culture encompassed regions of modern Ukraine, Moldova, and Romania. The spelling Chernyakhov is the transliteration from Russian Черняхов for an archaeological site in the vicinity of Kyiv, modern Ukraine. Other spellings include Черняхів, Cherniakhiv (Ukrainian), Czerniachów (Polish), and several others. The culture has also been named after Sântana de Mureș, a cemetery site in Transylvania, Romania, spelled Sîntana de Mureș before 1993. This site is also known as Marosszentanna, the formerly official Hungarian name under which the first excavations took place. The dual name reflects past preferential use by different schools of history (Romanian and Soviet) to designate the culture.

== Origins ==
In the early 20th century, scholars devoted considerable effort to debating the ethnic affinities of people in the Chernyakhov zone. Soviet scholars, such as Boris Rybakov, saw it as the archaeological reflection of the Proto-Slavs, but western, especially German, historians, and Polish archeologists attributed it to the Goths. According to Kazimierz Godłowski (1979), the origins of Slavic culture should be connected with the areas of the upper Dnieper basin (the Kyiv culture), while the Chernyakhov culture with the federation of the Goths. However, the remains of archaeologically visible material culture and their link with ethnic identity are not as clear as originally thought.

Today, scholars recognize the Chernyakhov zone as representing a cultural interaction of a diversity of peoples, but predominantly those who already existed in the region, whether it be the Sarmatians, or the Getae-Dacians (some authors believe that the Getae-Dacians played the leading role in the creation of the culture).

== Culture ==
=== Funerary rites ===
Both inhumation and cremation were practiced. The dead were buried with grave goods – pottery, iron implements, bone combs, personal ornaments, although in later periods grave goods decrease. Of the inhumation burials, the dead were usually buried in a north–south axis (with head to north), although a minority are in east–west orientation. Funerary gifts often include fibulae, belt buckles, bone combs, glass drinking vessels and other jewelry. Women's burials in particular shared very close similarities with Wielbark forms - buried with two fibulae, one on each shoulder. Like in the Wielbark culture, Chernyakhov burials usually lack weapons as funerary gifts, except in a few cremation burials reminiscent of Przeworsk influences. Although cremation burials are traditionally associated with Dacian, Germanic and Slavic peoples, and inhumation is suggestive of nomadic practice, careful analysis suggests that the mixed burials were of an earlier period, whilst toward the end there was a trend toward inhumation burials without grave goods. This could be the result of the influences of Christianity, but could just as easily be explained in terms of an evolution of non-Christian beliefs about the afterlife.

=== Ceramic wares ===
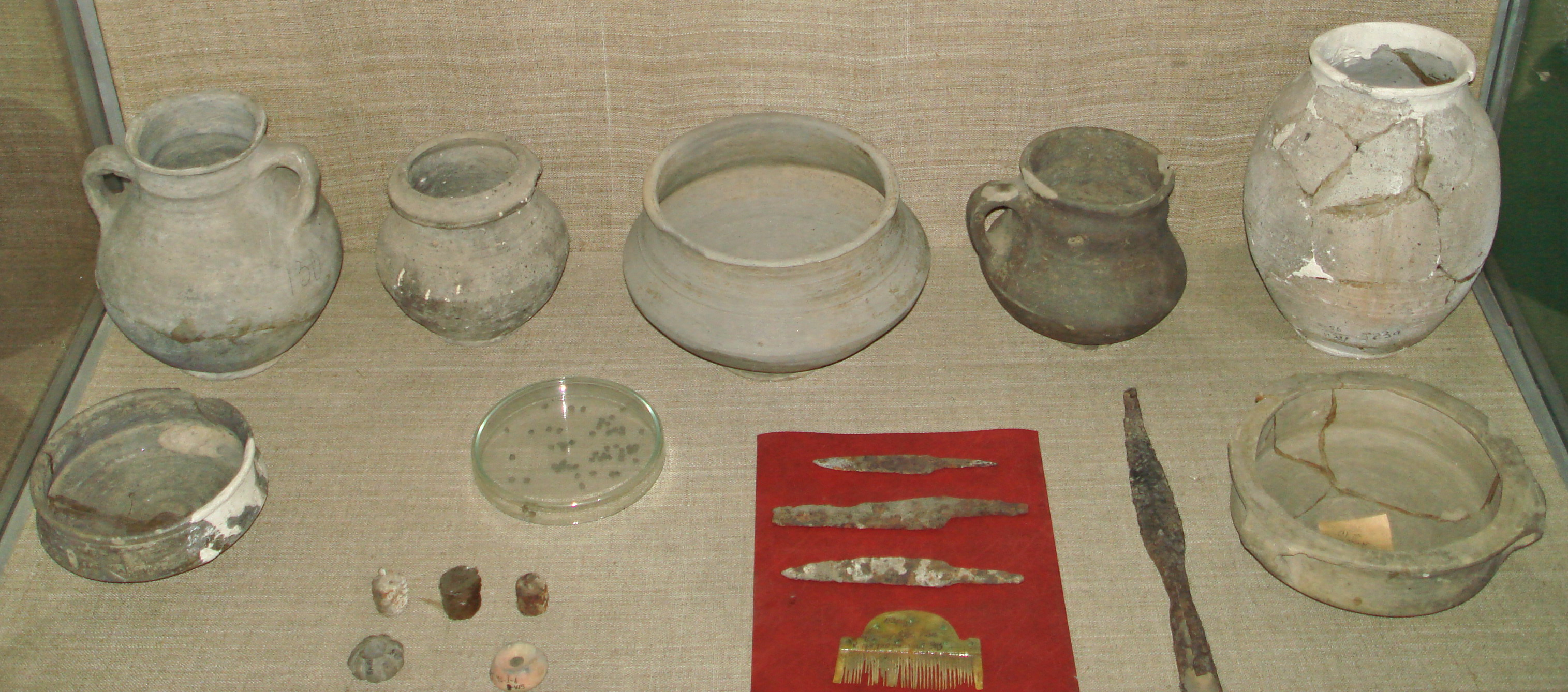
Finds from the Budeşti Necropolis in Raionul Criuleni, Moldova, 3rd/4th centuries

Pottery was predominantly of local production, being both wheel and hand-made. Wheel made pottery predominated, and was made of finer clay. It was reminiscent of earlier Sarmatian types, refined by Roman and La Tene influences. Hand made pottery showed a greater variety in form, and was sometimes decorated with incised linear motifs. In addition, Roman amphorae are also found, suggesting trade contacts with the Roman world. There is also a small, but regular, presence of distinct hand–made pottery typical of that found in western Germanic groups, suggesting the presence of Germanic groups.

=== Economy ===
The Chernyakhov people were primarily a settled population involved in cultivation of cereals – especially wheat, barley and millet. Finds of ploughshares, sickles and scythes have been frequent. Cattle breeding was the primary mode of animal husbandry, and the breeding of horses appears to have been restricted to the open steppe. Metalworking skills were widespread throughout the culture, and local smiths produced much of the implements, although there is some evidence of production specialization.

== Decline ==
The Chernyakhov culture ends in the 5th century, attributed to the arrival of the Huns. The collapse of the culture is no longer explained in terms of population displacement, although there was an outmigration of Goths. Around 370, a series of events including the presence of Huns at the eastern edge of the culture culminated with the death of Ermanaric, the leader of Gothic confederation, and his successor, Athanaric, found refuge south of Danube along with most of the Gothic population. Rather, more recent theories explain the collapse of the Chernyakhov culture in terms of a disruption of the hierarchical political structure that maintained it. John Mathews suggests that, despite its cultural homogeneity, a sense of ethnic distinction was kept between the disparate peoples. Some of the autochthonous elements persist, and become even more widespread, after the demise of the Gothic elite – a phenomenon associated with the rise and expansion of the early Slavs.

== Migration and diffusion theories ==
=== Migration ===
Whilst acknowledging the mixed origins of the Chernyakhov culture, Peter Heather suggests that the culture is ultimately a reflection of the Goths' domination of the Pontic area. He cites literary sources that attest that the Goths were the centre of political attention at this time. In particular, the culture's development corresponds well with Jordanes' tale of Gothic migration from Gothiscandza to Oium, under the leadership of Filimer. Moreover, he highlights that crucial external influences that catalysed Chernyakhov cultural development derived from the Wielbark culture. Originating in the mid-1st century, it spread from south of the Baltic Sea (from territory around later Pomerania) down the Vistula in the 2nd and 3rd centuries. Wielbark elements are prominent in the Chernyakhov zone, such as typical 'Germanic' pottery, brooch types and female costume, and, in particular, weaponless bi-ritual burials. Although cultures may spread without substantial population movements, Heather draws attention to a decrease in the number of settlements in the original Pomeranian Wielbark heartland as evidence of a significant population movement. Combined with Jordanes' account, Heather concludes that a movement of Goths (and other east Germanic groups such as Heruli and Gepids) "played a major role in the creation of the Cernjachove culture". He clarifies that this movement was not a single, royal-led, migration, but was rather accomplished by a series of small, sometimes mutually antagonistic groups.

=== Diffusion ===
However, Guy Halsall challenges some of Heather's conclusions. He sees no chronological development from the Wielbark to Chernyakhov culture, given that the latter stage of the Wielbark culture is synchronous with Chernyakhov, and the two regions have minimal territorial overlap. "Although it is often claimed that Cernjachov metalwork derives from Wielbark types, close examination reveals no more than a few types with general similarities to Wielbark types". Michael Kulikowski also challenges the Wielbark connection, highlighting that the greatest reason for Wielbark-Chernyakhov connection derives from a "negative characteristic" (i.e., the absence of weapons in burials), which is less convincing proof than a positive one. He argues that the Chernyakhov culture could just as likely have been an indigenous development of local Pontic, Carpic or Dacian cultures, or a blended culture resulting from Przeworsk and steppe interactions. Furthermore, he altogether denies the existence of Goths prior to the 3rd century. Kulikowski states that no Gothic people, nor even a noble kernel, migrated from Scandinavia or the Baltic. Rather, he suggests that the "Goths" formed in situ. Like the Alemanni or the Franks, the Goths were a "product of the Roman frontier".

Other influences, such as a minority of burials containing weapons, are seen from the Przeworsk and Zarubinec cultures. The latter has been connected with early Slavs.

== Genetics ==
In 2019, a genetic study of different cultures and periods on the Eurasian Steppe, including the Chernyakhov culture, was published in Current Biology. Out of 31 ancient individuals tested, three samples which the authors identified with "Ukrainian post-Scythian Chernyakhiv culture" were analyzed. They "overlapped with modern Europeans, representing the most 'western' range of variation among the groups of this study". They had none of the East Asian component of ancestry and they had more Near Eastern ancestry than historically earlier samples from the region. The authors note that the Chernyakhov culture was "likely ethnically heterogeneous", but they suggest that their three samples "appear to represent its Gothic component". They reasoned that the samples were Gothic because their origins seem to be from further west in Europe, given that Near Eastern ancestry is associated in European populations with the immigration of the first Neolithic farmers. The mtDNA haplogroups of the three samples were H1n6, H1c and T2g1.

== See also ==
- Oium
- Carpathian Tumuli culture

== Sources ==
- Mallory, James P.; Adams, Douglas Q. (1997). Encyclopedia of Indo-European Culture. Taylor & Francis. ISBN 1-884964-98-2.
- Heather, Peter (2006). The Fall of the Roman Empire: A New History of Rome and the Barbarians. Oxford University Press. ISBN 0-19-515954-3.
- Eiddon, Iorwerth; Edwards, Stephen; Heather, Peter (1998). "Goths & Huns". The Late Empire. The Cambridge Ancient History. Vol. 13. Cambridge University Press. ISBN 0-521-30200-5.
- Barford, Paul M (2001). The Early Slavs: Culture and Society in Early Medieval Eastern Europe. Cornell University Press. ISBN 0-8014-3977-9.
- Halsall, Guy (2007). Barbarian migrations and the Roman West, 376-568. Cambridge University Press. ISBN 978-0-521-43491-1.
- Curta, Florin (2001). The Making of the Slavs: History and Archaeology of the Lower Danube Region, c. 500–700. Cambridge: Cambridge University Press. ISBN 9781139428880.
- Gomolka-Fuchs, Gudrun (ed.) (1999). Die Sîntana de Mureş-Černjachov-Kultur. Akten des internationalen Kolloquiums in Caputh vom 20. bis 24. Oktober 1995. Kolloquien zur Vor- und Frühgeschichte, vol. 2. Bonn: Habelt, ISBN 3-7749-2944-0.
- Järve, Mari (July 22, 2019). "Shifts in the Genetic Landscape of the Western Eurasian Steppe Associated with the Beginning and End of the Scythian Dominance". Current Biology. 29 (14): 2430–2441. Bibcode:2019CBio...29E2430J. doi:10.1016/j.cub.2019.06.019. PMID 31303491. "Genetic makeup agrees with the Gothic source of post- Scythian Chernyakhiv culture"
- Kossinna, Gustaf (1911). Die Herkunft der Germanen: zur methode der Siedlungsarchäologie (in German). Würzburg: C. Kabitzsch.
- Matthews, John; Heather, Peter (1991). The Goths in the fourth century. Liverpool University Press. ISBN 0-85323-426-4.
- Heather, Peter J (1998). The Goths. Wiley-Blackwell. ISBN 0-631-20932-8.
- Kulikowski, Michael (2007). Rome's Gothic Wars: from the third century to Alaric. Cambridge University Press. ISBN 978-0-521-84633-2.
- Buko, Andrzej (2008). The Archeology of Early Medieval Poland. Discoveries-Hypotheses-Interpretations. Brill. ISBN 978-90-04-16230-3.
