= Filimer =

Early Gothic king

Filimer was an early Gothic king, according to Jordanes. He was the son of Gadaric and the fifth generation since Berig settled with his people in Gothiscandza. When the Gothic nation had multiplied Filimer decided to move his people to Scythia where they defeated the Sarmatians. They then named their new territory Oium, meaning "in the waterlands". This migration would have allegedly taken place about 2030 years before Jordanes wrote his "Origin of the Goths".

The archaeological record shows that the population of the Gothic Wielbark culture (Poland) had indeed moved and settled in Ukraine and mixed with the previous populations of the Zarubintsy culture, where they formed the Chernyakhiv culture. This cultural movement is identified as the migration of the Goths from Gothiscandza to Oium, but not all scholars find the evidence compelling.

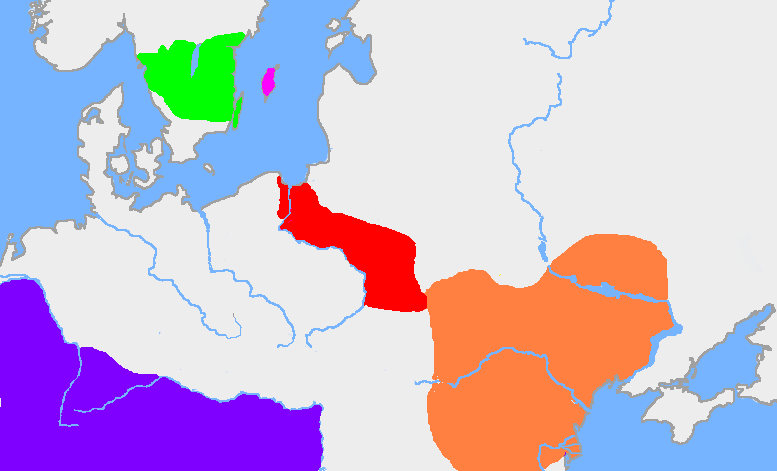
The red area is Gothiscandza (the Wielbark culture), and the orange area is the extent of Oium (the Chernyakhov culture). The dark pink area is Gotland and the green area is the land of the Geats (Götaland). The dark blue area is the Roman Empire.

Jordanes (XXIV:121) also relates that Filimer expelled the witches, who were called haliurunnas. These witches were condemned to seek refuge far away and were said to have given birth to the first Huns.

The Danish scholar Arne Søby Christensen has suggested that the name Filimer was made up by Cassiodorus, a suggestion that was favourably received among historians.
