= Gothiscandza =

First settlement area of the Goths

According to a tale related by Jordanes in his Getica, Gothiscandza was the first settlement area of the Goths after their migration from Scandza during the first half of the 1st century CE. He claimed that the name was still in use in his own day (c. 551).

== Jordanes' account ==
Jordanes relates that the East Germanic tribe of Goths were led from Scandza by their king Berig. As soon as they had set foot in the land, they named the area Gothiscandza. The slowest of the three ships carried the Gepids, who settled in the "province of Spesis on an island surrounded by the shallow waters of the Vistula. This island they called, in the speech of their fathers, Gepedoios".

They soon moved to the settlements of the Rugians (Ulmerugi, a Germanic tribe which had arrived in the area already before the Goths), who lived on the coast, and they chased them away. Then they defeated their new neighbours, the Vandals.

After some time, when at least four generations of kings had passed after Berig, and Filimer was the king of the Goths, their numbers had multiplied. Filimer decided that everyone was to leave Gothiscandza and move to a new region named Oium (Scythia).

The reliability of Jordanes for early Gothic history has been called into question.

== Etymology ==
One interpretation of Gothiscandza is that is a Latinised form of the Gothic gutisk-an[d]ja, "Gothic end (or frontier)", since the Goths' territory extended to here. Another interpretation is that an[d]ja means "cape" so that the whole word means "gothic peninsula". It is also possible that the word is a product of conflation of the words gothic and Scandinavia. Herwig Wolfram mentions "Gothic coast" and "Gothic Scandia" but prefers the latter, thinking that the former is "linguistically questionable".

== Identification ==
=== History and linguistics ===
In the 1st century AD, the mouth of the Vistula was indicated as the land of the Gutones (Pliny the Elder) or Gothones (Tacitus):

Beyond the Lygians dwell the Gothones, under the rule of a king; and thence held in subjection somewhat stricter than the other German[ic] nations, yet not so strict as to extinguish all their liberty. Immediately adjoining are the Rugians and Lemovians upon the coast of the ocean, and of these several nations the characteristics are a round shield, a short sword and kingly government.

— Tacitus, Germania, chapter 44

The names given by Pliny and Tacitus appear to be identical to *Gutaniz, the reconstructed Proto-Germanic form of Gutans, the Goths' and the Gotlanders' name for themselves.

The Gothiscandza theme was revived in German scholarship by Gustav Kossinna. Several archaeologists and historians have proposed the theory that the name Gothiscandza was evolved linguistically into Kashubian and other West Slavic languages' rendition of the various historical names of Gdańsk (German: Danzig).

=== Archaeology ===
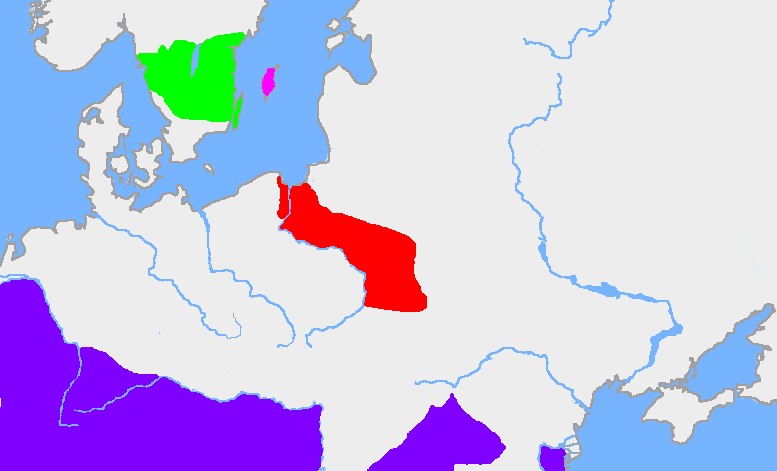
The red area is the extent of the Wielbark Culture in the first half of the 3rd century. The dark pink area is Gotland and the green area is the traditional extent of Götaland

In the 1st century a new culture appeared at the mouth of the Vistula, called the Wielbark Culture replacing the local Oksywie culture. The most salient component of Scandinavian influence in the 1st century AD is the introduction of Scandinavian burial traditions such as stone circles and the stelae, showing that those who buried their dead preferred to do so according to Scandinavian traditions.

However, there is also archaeological evidence of previous Scandinavian influence in the area during the Nordic Bronze Age and the Pre-Roman Iron Age, perhaps corresponding to the arrival of Rugians and Vandals.

In the 3rd century AD, the Wielbark culture spread into Scythia, where it formed the Gothic Chernyakhov culture.

== Norse mythology ==
Norse mythology presents at least two traditions that may be connected to Gothiscandza. The first one, the Gutasaga, may refer to the migration of the Goths and the second one, the legend of Dag the Wise, of raids from Scandza.

=== The Gutasaga ===
The Gutasaga relates that when the Gotlanders had multiplied so that the island (Gotland, i.e. Goth-land) no longer could support them, they drew lots so that one third of the island's inhabitants had to leave and settle in the south. They eventually settled in the land of the Greeks.

over a long time, the people descended from these three multiplied so much that the land couldn't support them all. Then they draw lots, and every third person was picked to leave, and they could keep everything they owned and take it with them, except for their land. ... they went up the river Dvina, up through Russia. They went so far that they came to the land of the Greeks. ... they settled there, and live there still, and still have something of our language.

=== Ynglingatal ===
The legend of Dag the Wise may convey traditions of attacks by the Suiones in the 2nd or 3rd century. In Scandinavian sources, the territory is called Reidgotaland, a name that followed the Goths during their migrations in the Norse sagas.
