= Ablabius (historian) =

Historian of the Goths

Ablabius (floruit 3rd-5th-century CE) is thought to be either a historian, a geographer or ethnographer, (Note: Jordanes in all three fragments refers to Ablabius as a historian (istoricus) or to his work as one of history (historia). But he also calls him 'a descriptor Gothicorum gentis', a term which applies also to ethnographers (Van Hoof & Van Nuffelen 2020, pp. 138–139).) who had written about the Goths, and whose work is cited by the influential 6th century historian of the Goths, Jordanes. Since Jordanes himself states that he based his own work on recollections of reading a work on Gothic history, now lost, composed by Cassiodorus, Ablabius has traditionally been thought of as a source also for the latter work, though this view has met with considerable scepticism.

== Date ==
Several different dates, all based on inferences both from what Jordanes writes, and the nature of the material he provides from this source, have been suggested for Ablabius's lifetime. Hypotheses have placed him as early as the 3rd century or in the age of Constantine (272–337), or concurrent with Theodosius the Calligrapher (401–450) or with either of two Visigothic kings, Euric (420–484) or his successor Alaricus (458/466–507).

Ablabius's origins – whether he was a Goth, a Greek or a Roman, are unknown.

== Textual Fragments ==
In his Getica (550-551 CE) Jordanes cites him on three occasions.

Fragment 1 at Getica 4.28

- 'So this part of the Goths is said to have crossed the river and migrated to the country of Oium with Filemer, and they acquired the land they desired. They came immediately to the nation of the Spali, joined in battle with them, gained a victory, and from there, like conquerors, hastened to the furthest part of Scythia, which is close to the Pontic Sea. Thus it is generally celebrated in their ancestral songs (in priscis eorum carminibus), in a manner that is almost historical. Ablabius, the distinguished surveyor of the Gothic race, also attests to this in his most trustworthy history. (Note: "Haec ergo pars Gothorum, quae apud Filemer dicitur in terras Oium emenso amne transposita, optatum potiti solum. Nec mora ilico ad gentem Spalorum adveniunt consertoque proelio victoriam adipiscunt, exindeque iam velut victores ad extremam Scythiae partem, que Ponto mari vicina est, properant. Quemadmodum et in priscis eorum carminibus pene storicu (storico) ritu in commune recolitur: quod et Ablavius descriptor Gothorum gentis egregius verissima adtestatur historia." (Van Hoof & Van Nuffelen 2020, p. 140))

Fragment 2 at Getica 14.82

- 'Now Ablabius the historian relates that in Scythia, where we have said that they were dwelling above an arm of the Pontic Sea, part of them who held the eastern region and whose king was Ostrogotha, were called Ostrogoths, that is, eastern Goths, either from his name or from the place. But the rest were called Visigoths, that is, the Goths of the western country.' (Note: "Ablabius enim storicus refert, quia ibi super limbum Ponti, ubi eos diximus in Scythia commanere, ibi pars eorum, qui orientali plaga tenebat, eisque praeerat Ostrogotha, utrum ab ipsius nomine, an a loco, id est orientales, dicti sunt Ostrogothae, residui vero Vesegothae, id est a parte occidua." (Van Hoof & Van Nuffelen 2020, p. 141))

Fragment 3 at Getica 23.117

- 'But though famous for his conquest of so many races, he gave himself no rest until he had slain some in battle and then reduced to his sway the remainder of the tribe of the Heruli, whose chief was Alaric. Now the aforesaid race, as the historian Ablabius tells us, dwelt near Lake Maeotis in swampy places which the Greeks call helē.; hence they were named Heruli. They were a people swift of foot, and on that account were the more swollen with pride', (Note: "Sed cum tantorum servitio clarus haberetur, non passus est nisi et gentem Herulorum, quibus praeerat Halaricus, magna ex parte trucidatam reliquam suae subegeret dicioni. Nam praedicta gens, Ablavio istorico referente, iuxta Meotida palude inhabitants in locis stagnatibus, quas Greci ele vocant, Eluri nominati sunt, gens quantum velox, eo amplius superbissima." (Van Hoof & Van Nuffelen 2020, p. 143))

This fragment is close to a similar passage in Dexippus.

== Evaluations ==
The evidence from Jordanes suggests that he was not quoted for historical details concerning the Goths: the three fragments indicate the writer's interest in ethnographic details, such as the origins and names of barbarian tribes, and Goths, in the region of Scythia.

It has been suggested that the work of Ablabius was the first written history of the Goths, and that this formed the basis of a more detailed account written by Cassiodorus. It is likely that Jordanes used the work of Ablabius directly, but an intermediate source can not be ruled out either. According to Jordanes the work of Ablabius relied on folk songs and legends.

== Sources ==
- Gillett, Andrew (2000). Deroux, Carl (ed.). "Jordanes and Ablabius". Studies in Latin Literature and Roman History. X: 479–500.
- Heather, Peter J. (1991). Goths and Romans, 332–489. Clarendon Press. ISBN 978-0-198-20535-7.
- Liebeschuetz, John H. W. G. (2011). "Making a Gothic History: Does the Getica of Jordanes preserve genuinely Gothic Traditions?". Journal of Late Antiquity. 4 (2): 185–216. doi:10.1353/jla.2011.0018. S2CID 201777412.
- Liebeschuetz, John H. W. G. (2015). East and West in Late Antiquity: Invasion, Settlement, Ethnogenesis and Conflicts of Religion. Brill. ISBN 978-9-004-28952-9.
- Mierow, Charles Christopher (1915). The Gothic history of Jordanes. Princeton University Press.
- Van Hoof, Lieve; Van Nuffelen, Peter (2020). "Ablabius". The Fragmentary Latin Histories of Late Antiquity (AD 300-620): Edition, Translation and Commentary. Cambridge University Press. pp. 137–145. ISBN 978-1-108-42027-3.
