= Wielbark, Pomeranian Voivodeship =

Village in Poland

Wielbark
- Village
- Location within Poland
- Coordinates: 53°59′46″N 19°0′22″E
- Country: Poland
- Voivodeship: Pomeranian
- County: Malbork
- Gmina: Malbork
- Population: 103
- Time zone: UTC+1 (CET)
  - Summer (DST): UTC+2 (CEST)
- Vehicle registration: GMB

Wielbark [ˈvjɛlbark] is a village in the administrative district of Gmina Malbork, within Malbork County, Pomeranian Voivodeship, in northern Poland.

Between the end of the 13th century and the 15th, the village lay in the territory of the Teutonic Knights. In 1454, King Casimir IV Jagiellon incorporated the region to the Kingdom of Poland. In 1466, the Teutonic Knights renounced claims, and it was confirmed as part of Poland, within which it was a royal village, administratively located in the Malbork Voivodeship in the province of Royal Prussia in the Greater Poland Province. After the First Partition of Poland, it was annexed by the Kingdom of Prussia and from 1871 it was also part of Germany. After Germany's defeat in World War II, it became again part of Poland.

In 1873, a cemetery of the ancient Wielbark culture was discovered not far from the village.

The place is not to be confused with Wielbark, Warmian-Masurian Voivodeship.
