= Wielbark culture =

Archaeological culture in present-day Poland

Coordinates: 54°02′N 19°03′E

- Geographical range: Poland
- Period: Iron Age, Migration Period
- Dates: ca. 100–400
- Preceded by: Germanic peoples, Oksywie culture, Przeworsk culture
- Followed by: Goths, Sukow-Dziedzice group

The Wielbark culture (German: Wielbark-Willenberg-Kultur; Polish: Kultura wielbarska) is an Iron Age archaeological complex that flourished on the territory of today's Poland from the 1st century to the 5th century.

The Wielbark culture played an important role in the Amber Road, linking it to southern Europe. The culture is associated with the first century Rugii, who apparently moved by the 4th cenury to the north bank of the Danube in what is now Austria, and the Gutones who are seen as possible ancestors of the third century Goths in what is now Ukraine. It displays cultural links not only with its neighbours, but also with southern Scandinavia.

The Wielbark culture replaced the preceding Oksywie culture on the lower Vistula in the 1st century, and subsequently expanded southwards at the expense of the Przeworsk culture, which is associated with the Vandals. This expansion has been associated by historians such as Peter Heather with the contemporary Marcomannic Wars. By the late 3rd century, the Wielbark culture had expanded into the area of the upper Dniester, where it possibly influenced the Chernyakhov culture to its south, which encompassed a large area between the Danube and the Don River and is associated with the Goths.

In the 5th century, the Wielbark culture was replaced by the Sukow-Dziedzice group, which is associated with the Early Slavs.

== Discovery ==
The Wielbark culture was named after the once-Prussian village, known in German as Willenberg, where a burial place with over 3,000 tombs, was discovered and partially recorded in 1873.

The "first modern description" of the culture was not until the work of Ryszard Wołągiewicz in the 1970s. The cemetery's completeness and long period of use was the reason this site was chosen to name the culture, which "spans all the phases of Wielbark culture as well as phases predating its emergence and thus dating to the earlier, pre-Roman period".

Many of the cemetery stones were moved, and many graves were damaged by the early discoverers, particularly during the Second World War.

== Characteristics ==
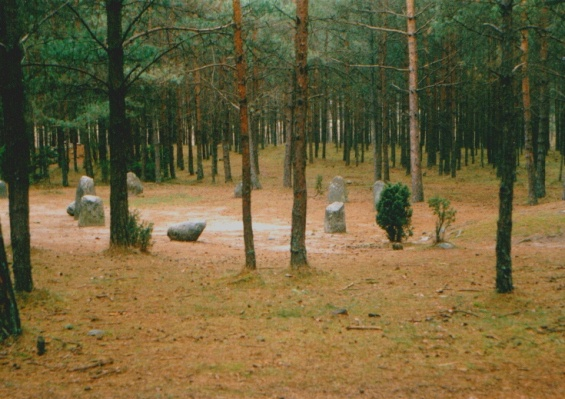
A stone circle in northern Poland – Kashubia.

Before the Common Era, as the Roman Empire became more influential in northern Europe, there was relative consistency in burial practices between the Rhine and Vistula. Bodies were normally cremated and there were few grave goods, if any. This began to change, possibly reflecting increasing social stratification. The Wielbark culture, for example, is distinguished by its occasional use of monumental "barrow" burials.

The Wielbark culture is primarily distinguished from its predecessor, the Oksywie culture, by the adoption of inhumation rather than cremation. Notably, the Wielbark culture used both rituals. Despite this, there is also evidence for continuity between the two cultures. This is interpreted as resulting from an evolution in spiritual culture.

The neighbouring Przeworsk culture, on the other hand, long continued to practice cremation, and whereas Wielbark burials never included weapons, Przeworsk burials often did. In the second century, however, the burial practices of the Wielbark culture began to spread into the Przeworsk area.

Instead, the artifacts recovered are mostly ornaments and costumes, although a few graves have yielded spurs, the only warrior attributes found. The people of the Wielbark culture used both inhumation and cremation techniques for burying their dead.

The Wielbark culture played an important role in the Amber Road. A complex series of wooden bridges and causeways built by the Wielbark culture were probably connected to this trade.

The Wielbark culture appears to have practiced mixed agriculture. Their lack of agricultural expertise reduced field fertility, leading to greater population mobility. Several settlements however remained stable for hundreds of years.

A characteristic of the Wielbark culture, shared with southern Scandinavia, was the construction of stone-covered mounds, stone circles, solitary stelae, and variations in cobble cladding. These stone circles might have been places of communal meetings.

The Wielbark culture displays several characteristics similar to those of the Chernyakhov culture. This includes the creation of handmade bowl-shaped ceramics, the wearing by females of fibulae on each shoulder, the presence of the Germanic longhouses, the practice of both cremation and inhumation, and the lack of weapons deposited in burials.

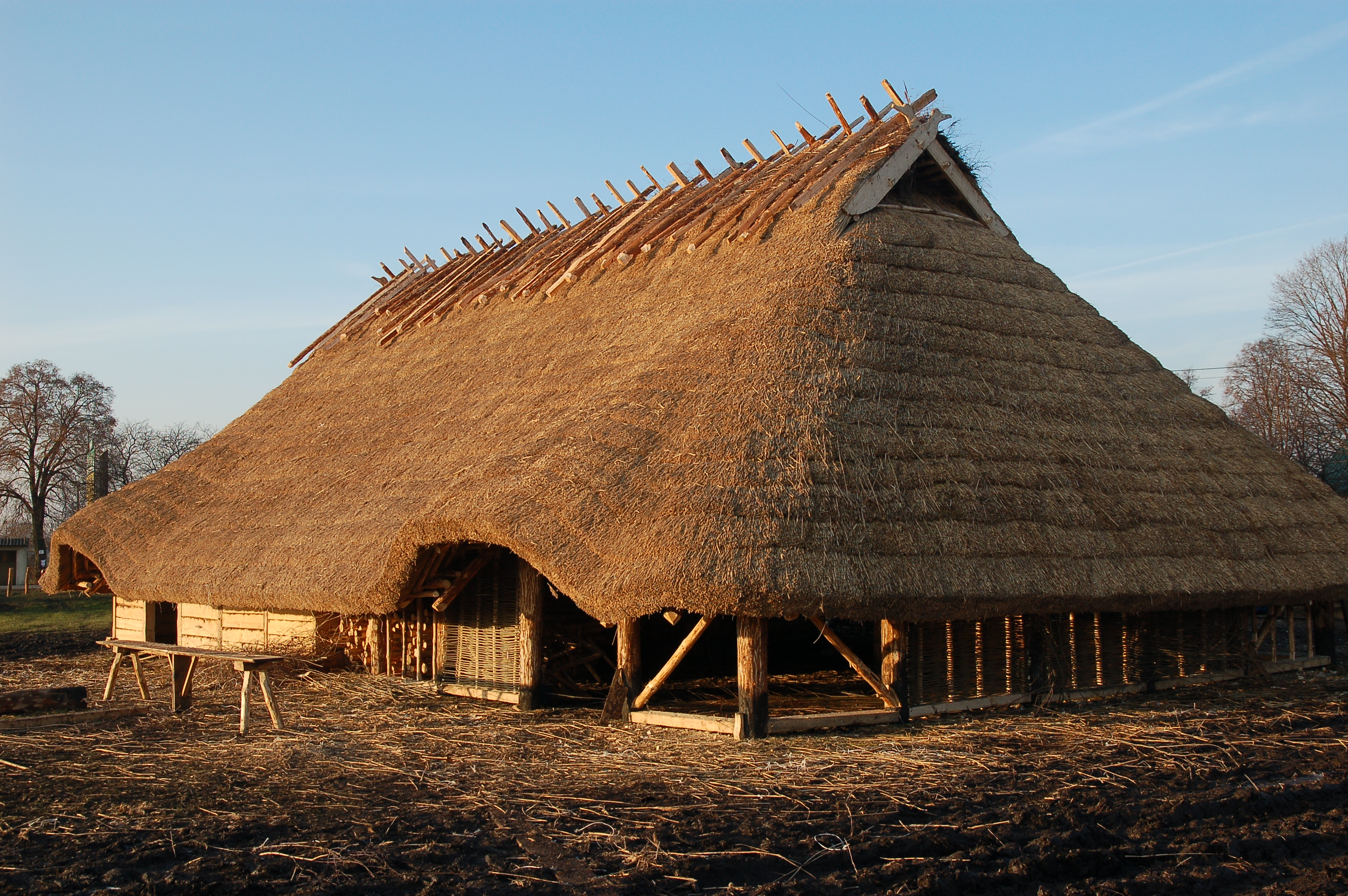
Reconstruction of a Wielbark culture house

Another feature of the Wielbark culture was the use of bronze to make ornaments and accessories. Silver was used infrequently, and gold was used rarely. Iron appears to have been used extremely rarely. In 2000, in Czarnówko near Lębork, Pomerania, a cemetery of Oksywie and Wielbark cultures was found. These reached their peak before the population's emigration to the south began. A bronze kettle depicts males wearing the Suebian knot hairstyle.

== History ==
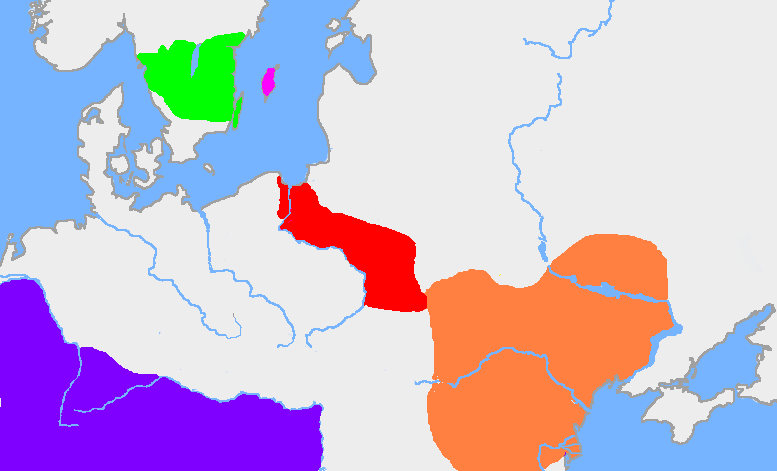
Land of the Geats (Götaland) Gotland Wielbark culture in the early 3rd century Chernyakhov culture in the early 4th century Roman Empire

The Wielbark culture emerged in the 1st century around the same area as the Oksywie culture, around the present day towns of Gdańsk and Chełmno. Whether the Wielbark culture was an outgrowth of the Oksywie culture or represents a new population is disputed. The increasing density of Wielbark centuries after its establishment suggests that it experienced significant population growth during its existence.

During the 1st and 2nd centuries, the Wielbark culture expanded into the lakelands (Kashubian and Krajenskian lakes) and stretched southwards, into the region around Poznań. Here it ejected the Przeworsk culture, which is often associated with the Vandals. Rather than being entirely replaced, archaeological evidence suggest that the Przeworsk were, to a certain extent, absorbed by the Wielbark. The southward expansion of the Wielbark burial practices has been linked to the onset of the Marcomannic Wars. By 200, people of the Wielbark culture appear to have been recruited as soldiers in the Roman Army.

In the first half of the 3rd century, the Wielbark culture expanded southwards along the Vistula and Bug towards the upper Dniester. Meanwhile, Pomeranian settlements by the Baltic Sea were somewhat, but not entirely, abandoned. This expansion was swifter and on an even larger scale than previous ones, and represented a significant shift of Wielbark power towards the south. The Gothic attack on Histria in 238 aligns chronologically with this expansion.

North of the Black Sea, the Chernyakhov culture formed in the late 3rd century, "incorporating elements of the Wielbark culture". By the 4th century it covered a huge area between the Danube and the Don River, and it is now universally accepted that the Chernyakhov culture represents the culture of the Goths and other peoples. Historians such as Peter Heather have argued that the connection between the Wielbark and Gothic cultures must have involved largescale migration including women and children. Other historians such as Herwig Wolfram and Guy Halsall in contrast that a relatively small migration of a military elite might have connected the two cultures. Michael Kulikowski has argued that it is not necessary to assume any significant influence from the Wielbark culture or the Vistula Gutones upon the Goths.

Isolated pockets of the Wielbark culture persisted in northern Poland until the 5th century. From then it was replaced by the Sukow-Dziedzice group, which is associated with Early Slavs.

== Ethnicity ==
The Wielbark culture has been described by archaeologists as a culture which contained both Germanic and non-Germanic people, which developed from the previous Oksywie material culture, with some influences from Scandinavia. Roman authors described the Gutones, Rugii and Lemovii as living in the same approximate area.

The Gutones have traditionally been equated to the ancestors of the Goths from Scandza (Scandinavia) to Gothiscandza as related in Jordanes' account of their origin. While such Scandinavian influence may well have played a part, the identical geographical extent and persistent use of Oksywie cemeteries suggest that the Wielbark Culture emerged from previous human settlements in the area, with new groups of Scandinavian immigrants making contributions to it as they arrived.

Based upon the accounts of Jordanes and Tacitus, many historians and archaeologists believe that the culture was politically dominated by the ancestors of the Goths, Rugii and Gepids who are later described in Roman and Greek sources further south, living north of the imperial border on the Danube. Along with the neighbouring Przeworsk culture, historian Peter Heather places it in the Germanic cultural horizon. (Note: "[T]he Wielbark and Przeworsk systems have come to be understood as thoroughly dominated by Germanic-speakers...) In the past, the Wielbark culture was often connected with Early Slavs, but such theories have been dismissed by modern scholarship.

The cemeteries may give some indication in evidence as to which settlements could have been established directly by Goths. Barrow cemeteries on the Baltic Sea in Poland, which have raised stone circles, and solitary stelae next to them, reflect Scandinavian burial customs with a concentration in Gotland and Götaland. Appearing in the later 1st century, this type is found between the Vistula and the Kashubian and Krajenskian lakelands (Odry and Węsiory sites) reaching into the Koszalin region (Grzybnica site).

== Physical characteristics ==
Odontological analysis revealed that the Central European populations from the Roman period and the Early Middle Ages were indistinguishable in terms of non-metrical dental traits, though this does not exclude the possibility of genetically different origins.

== Genetics ==
Juras et al. (2014) compared the mtDNA of the Wielbark culture and the Przeworsk culture, both belonging to the Roman Iron Age (RoIA) with that of populations from Poland in the Middle Ages. 24 samples of mtDNA from the Wielbark sites of Kowalewko (11) and Rogowo (13) were examined. Wielbark samples were found to be primarily carrying types of haplogroup H, while types of U and W were also frequent. It was found that the mtDNA of the RoiA populations was largely similar to that of medieval populations, although they displayed closer genetic relations to populations of northern and central Europe, while medieval populations on the other hand displayed closer genetic relations to Slavs of eastern and southern Europe. The mtDNA of the RoIA samples were found to be more closely related to Poles than any other modern population, while similarities with Balts and other West Slavs were also detected.

Stolarek et al. (2018) examined the mtDNA of 60 individuals buried at the Wielbark cemetery of Kowalewko in the 1st and 2nd centuries AD. The majority of the individuals carried types of haplogroup H and U. Notably, they displayed higher frequencies of U5b (a typically Western Hunter-Gatherer lineage) than preceding and succeeding populations in the area. Compared to some ancient DNA samples, the male mitochondrial mix was found to be most closely related to Iron Age Jutland and late Neolithic Central European Bell Beaker culture samples. The females were most similar to Early-Middle Neolithic farmers.

Stolarek et al. (2019) examined the mtDNA of 27 individuals from a Wielbark cemetery in Masłomęcz, Poland. The remains were from the 2nd to 4th centuries AD. Based on archaeological evidence, these individuals were assumed to be Goths. They were found to be mostly carriers of haplogroup H and U. The individuals displayed even closer genetic links to Iron Age populations of southern Scandinavia than those of Kowalewko did. Males and females at Masłomęcz were more closely related to each other than those at Kowalewko. They also carried fewer samples of U5b, and displayed less strong genetic links to the Yamanya culture, Corded Ware culture, Bell Beaker culture and Unetice culture than earlier Wielbark samples from Kowalewko.

Zenczak et al. (2017) assigned Y-DNA haplogroups to 16 individuals buried at the Kowalewko archeological site associated with the Wielbark culture. In total, 8 out of 16 samples were assigned to haplogroup I1. Out of the samples dated to the Roman Iron Age, 3 samples belonged to haplogroup I1 under the subclade I1-L1237 of the I1-Z63 branch, one to R1b, and one to I2a2.

Y-chromosome analysis of Goths from the Masłomęcz group cemeteries in southeastern Poland. A total of 14 individuals (78%) represents the Y chromosome haplogroups most closely related to the Scandinavian population. Thirteen individuals were classified into subclades of haplogroup I1, four to haplogroup R1a and one to haplogroup J2b.

Stolarek et al. (2023) tested several individuals buried in Wielbark culture cemeteries. The Y-chromosomes were 1 E (E1b1b1a1b1a), 1 F, 5 G2a (two G2a2b2a1a1b1a1a2 and three more with derived subclades), 19 I1-M253 with SNPs below L1237, Z2039 and P109, 1 I2a1b1, 1 J2b2a1, 1 J2a1a, 2 N1a, 2 R1a1a, 1 with derived R1a-M458, and 6 R1b (three of them with SNPs below U106).

A 2024 study published in Nature found that the population of the Wielbark culture derived 75% of their ancestry from a population similar to the people of the Scandinavian Early Iron Age.

== Gallery ==
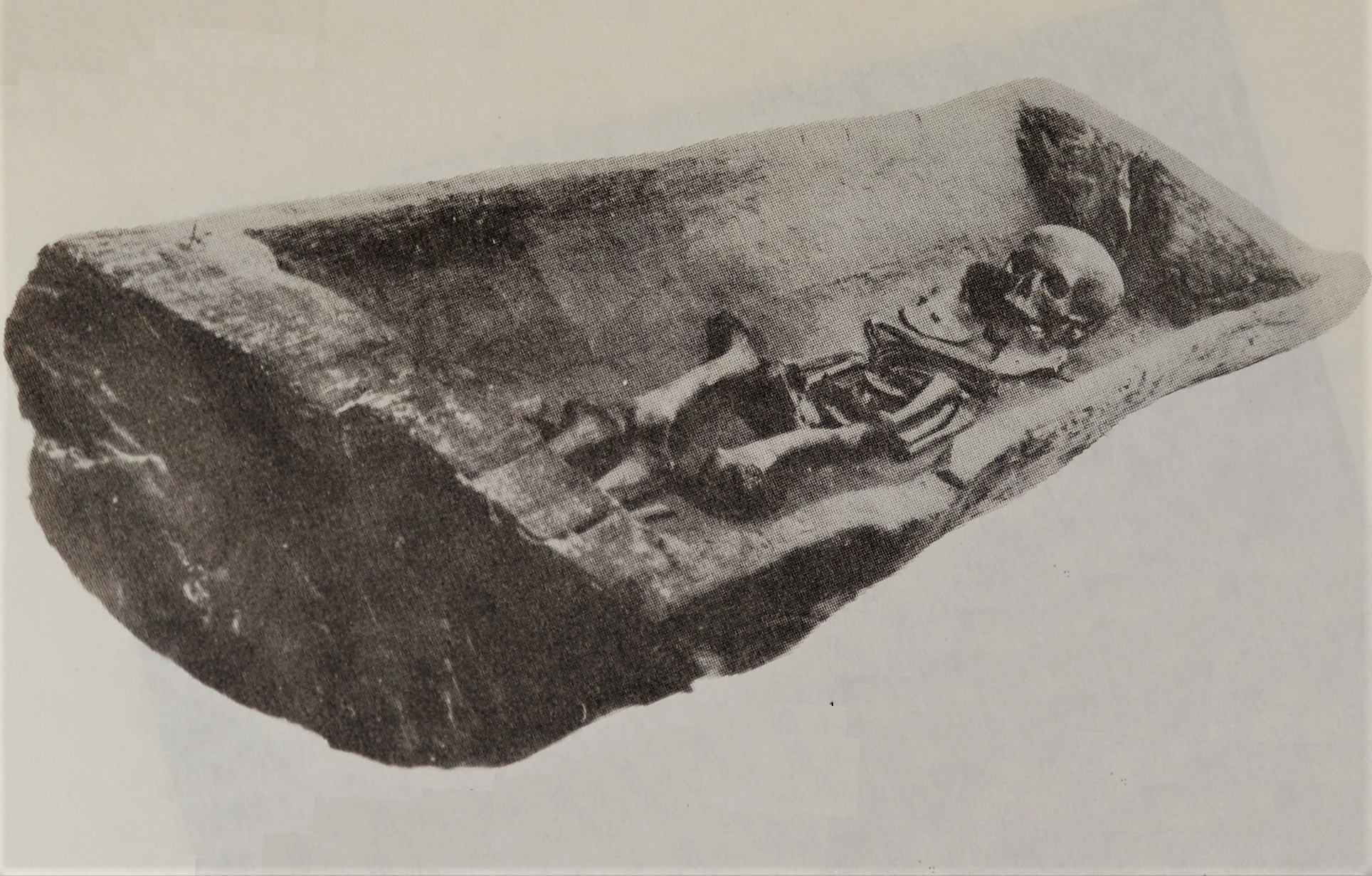
Princess of Bagicz

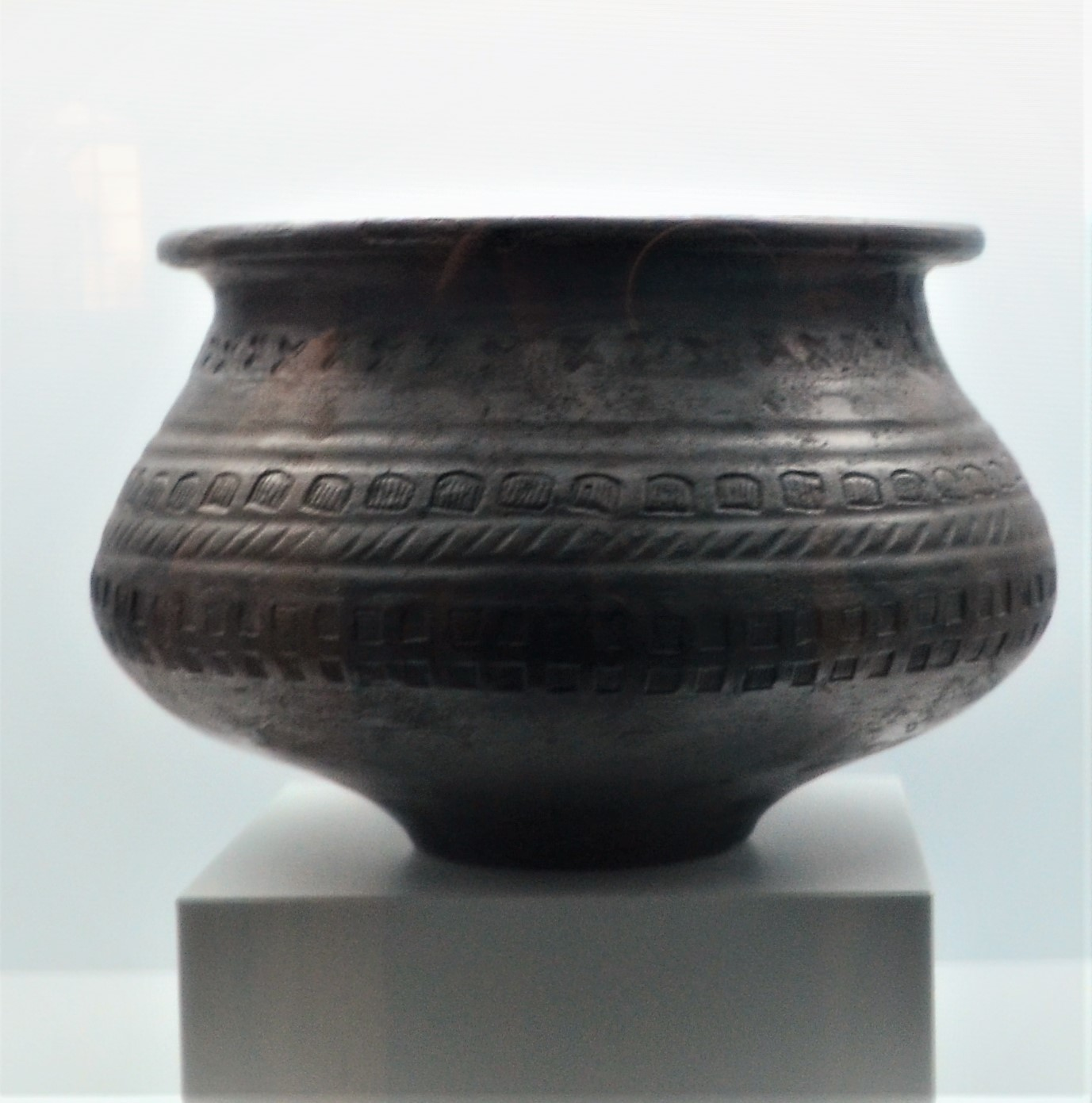

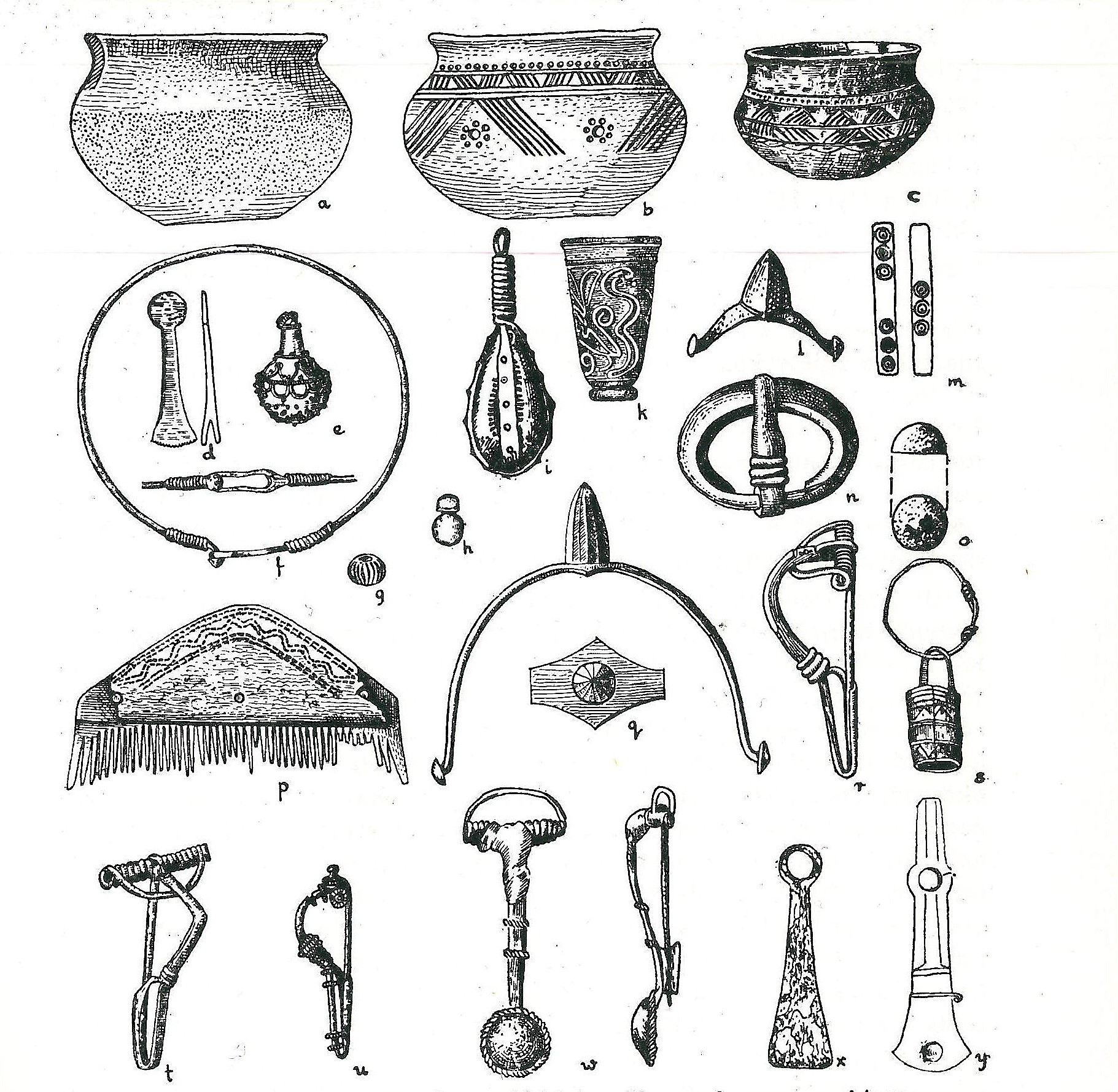

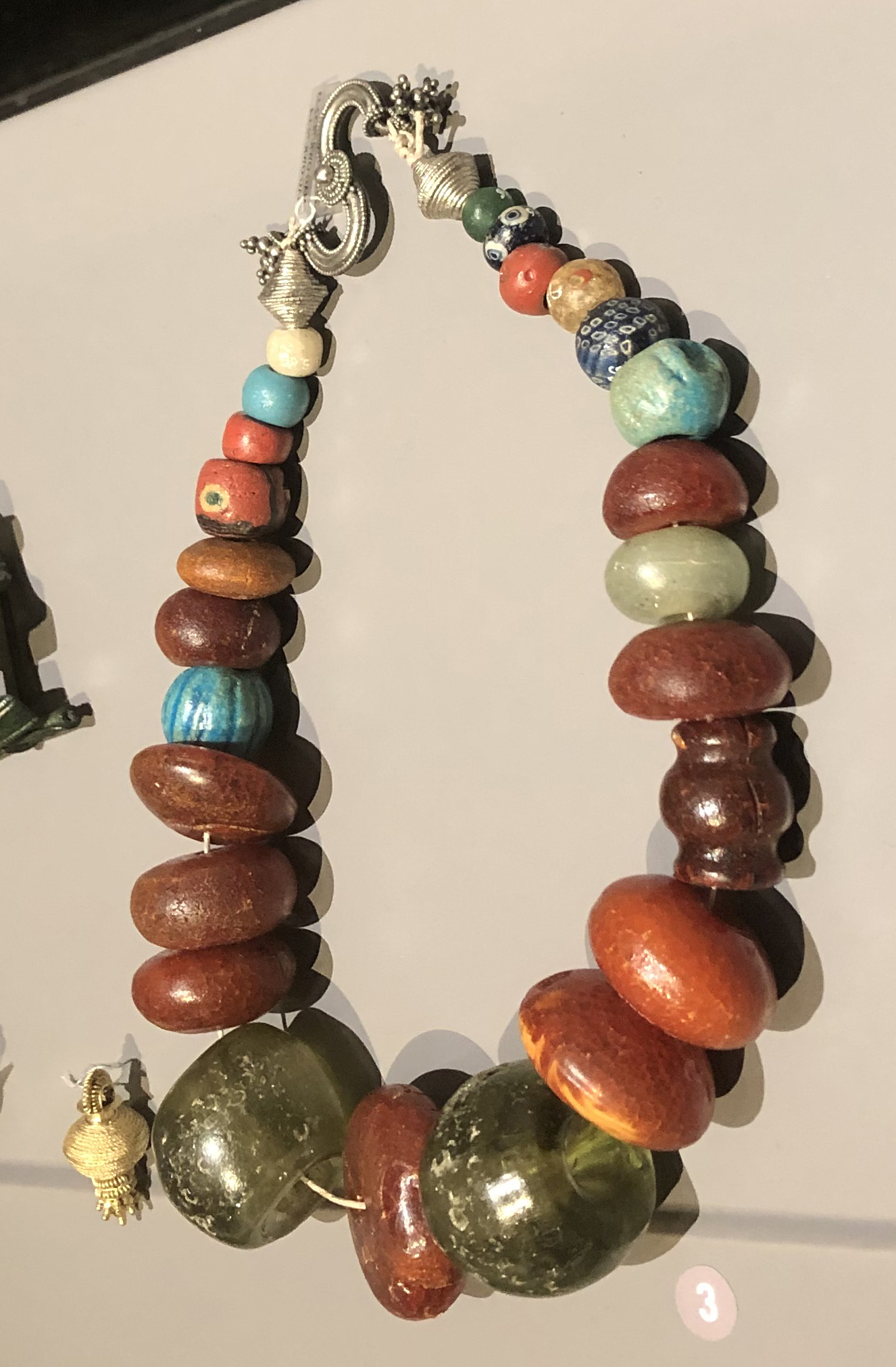

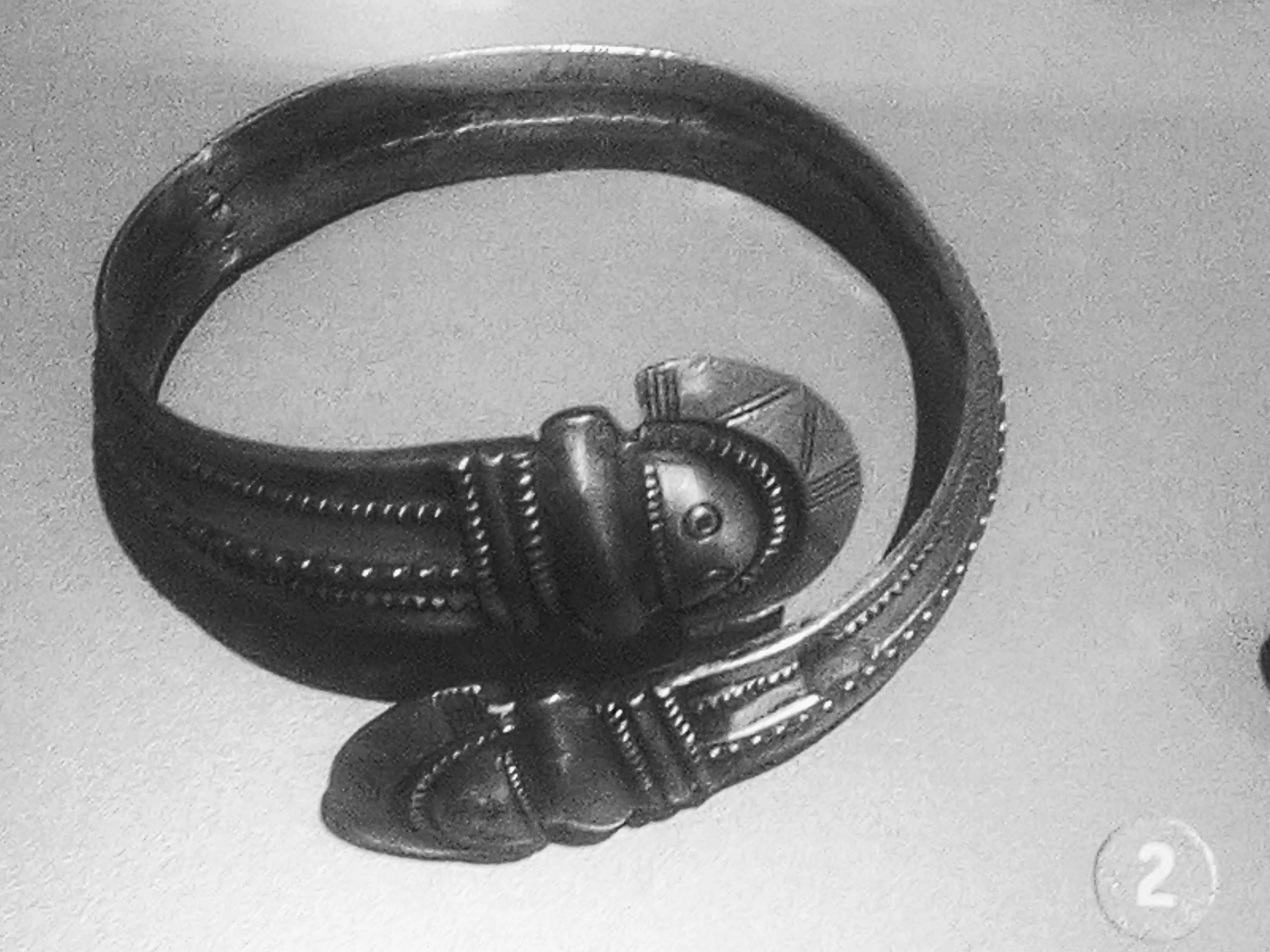

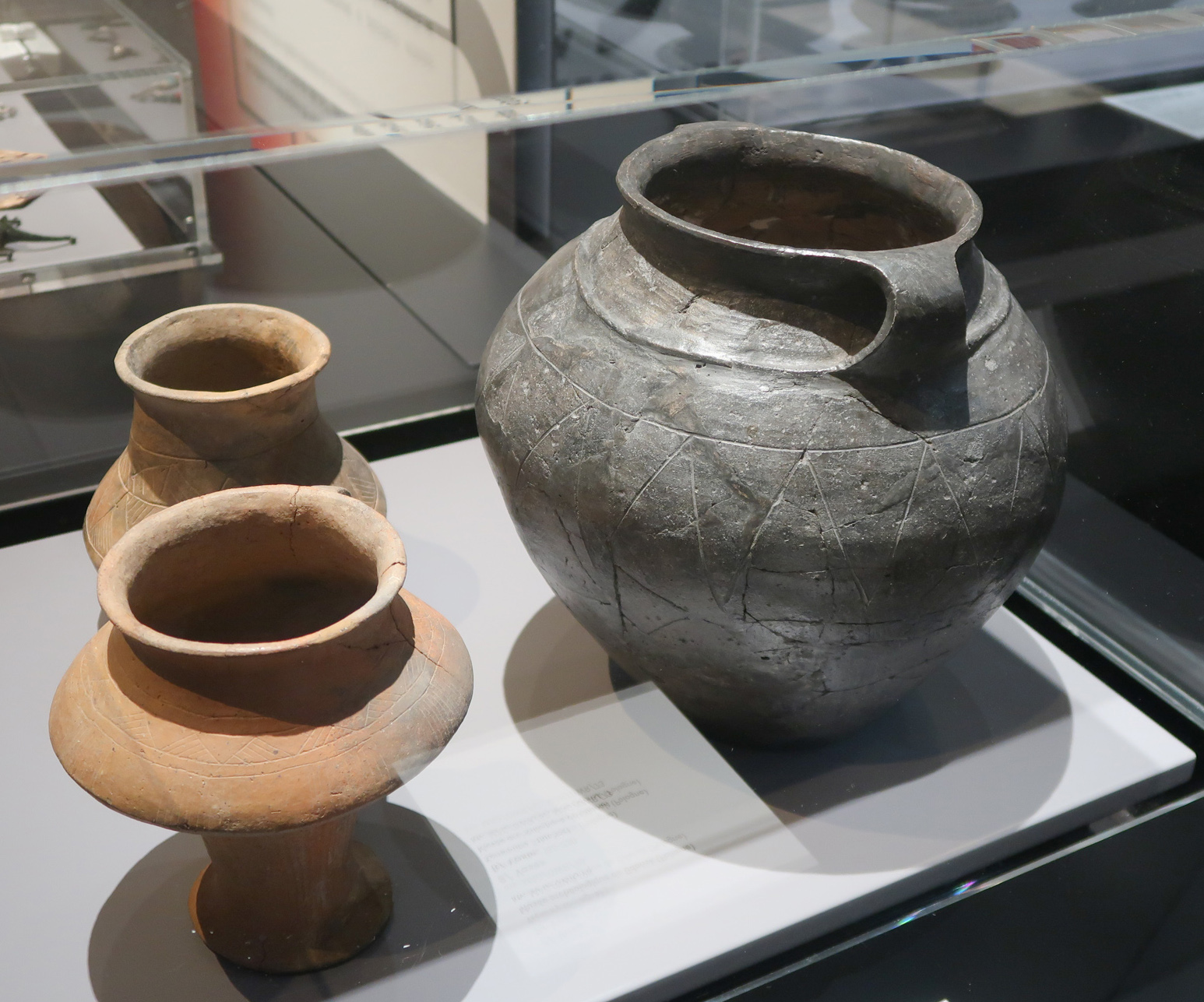

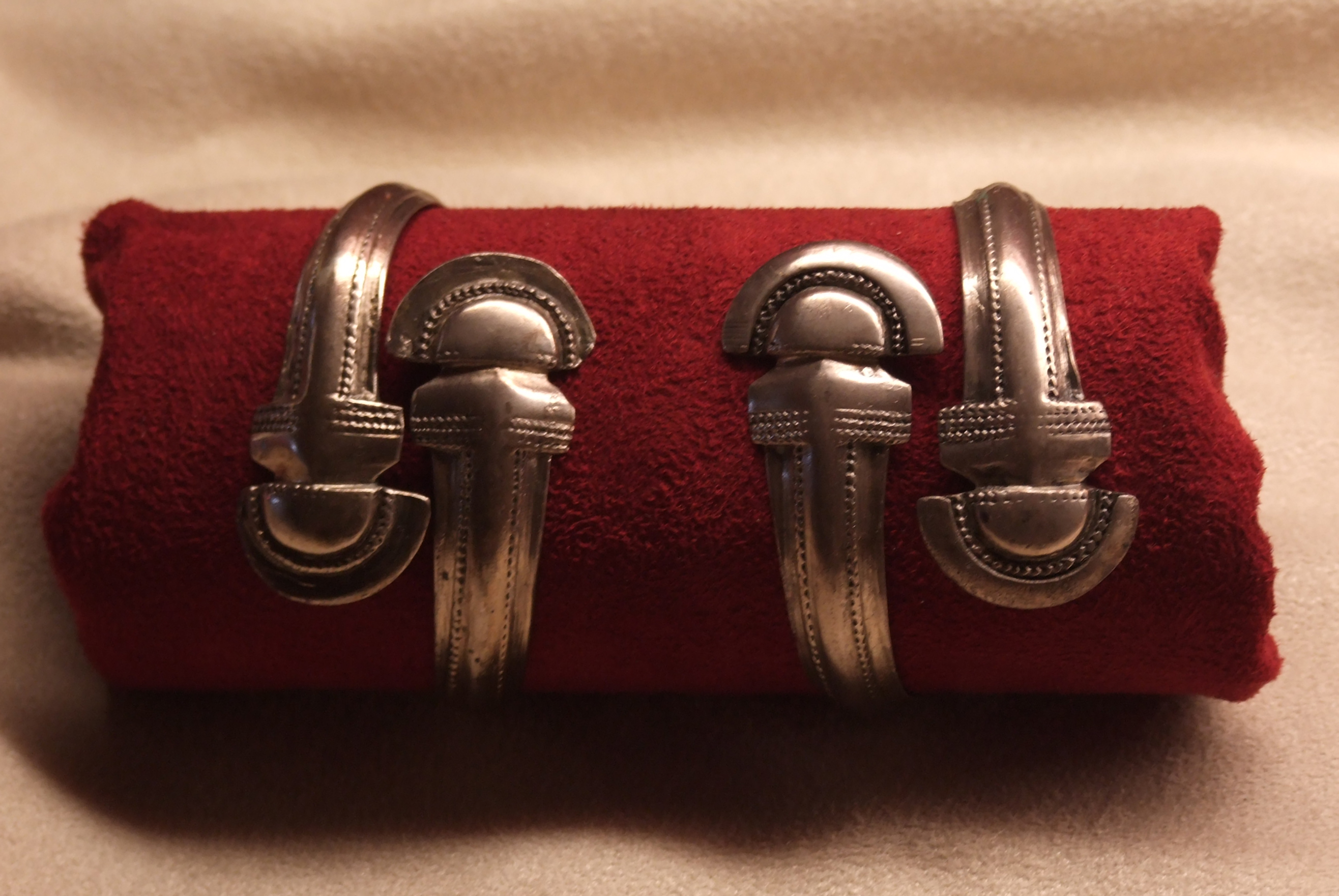

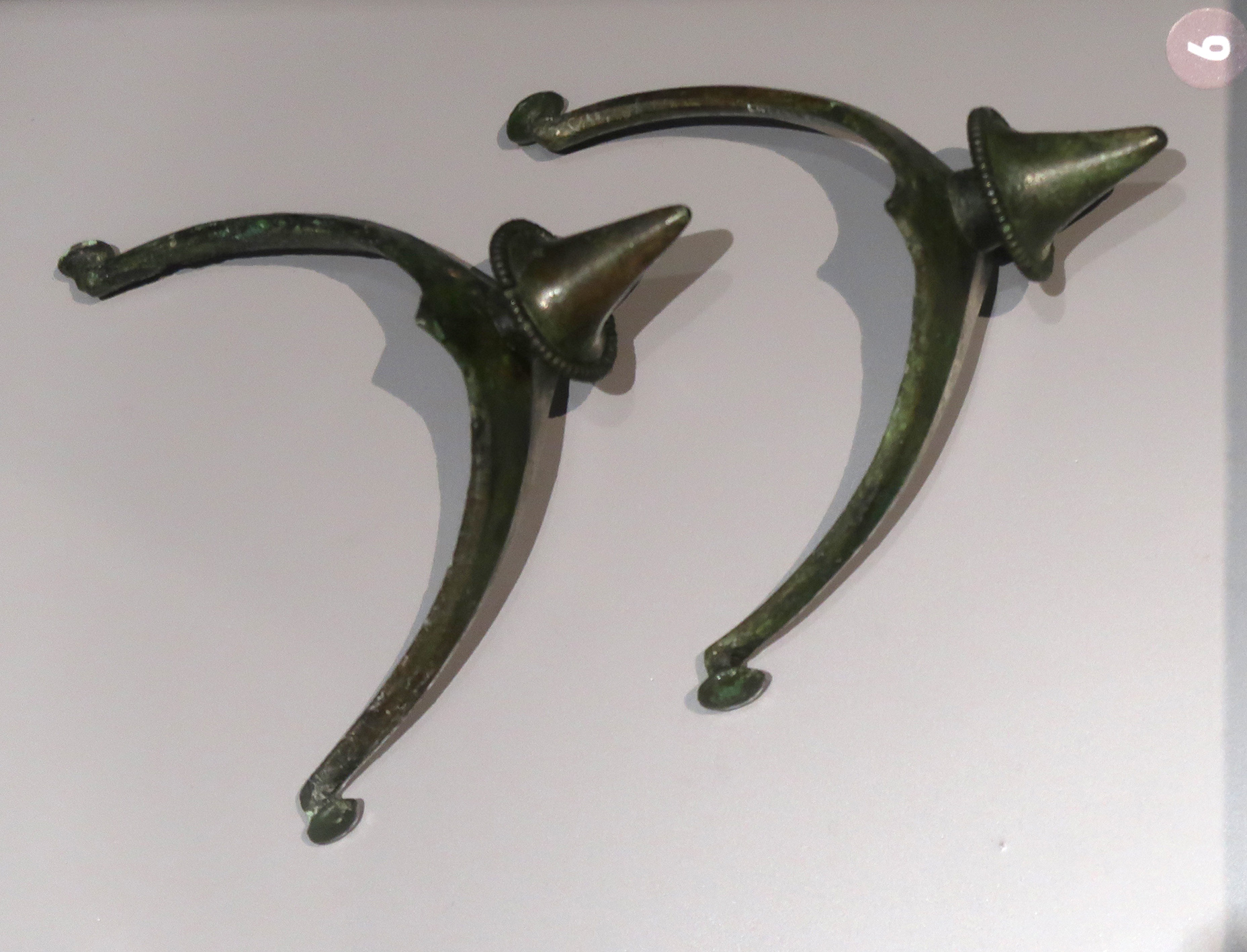

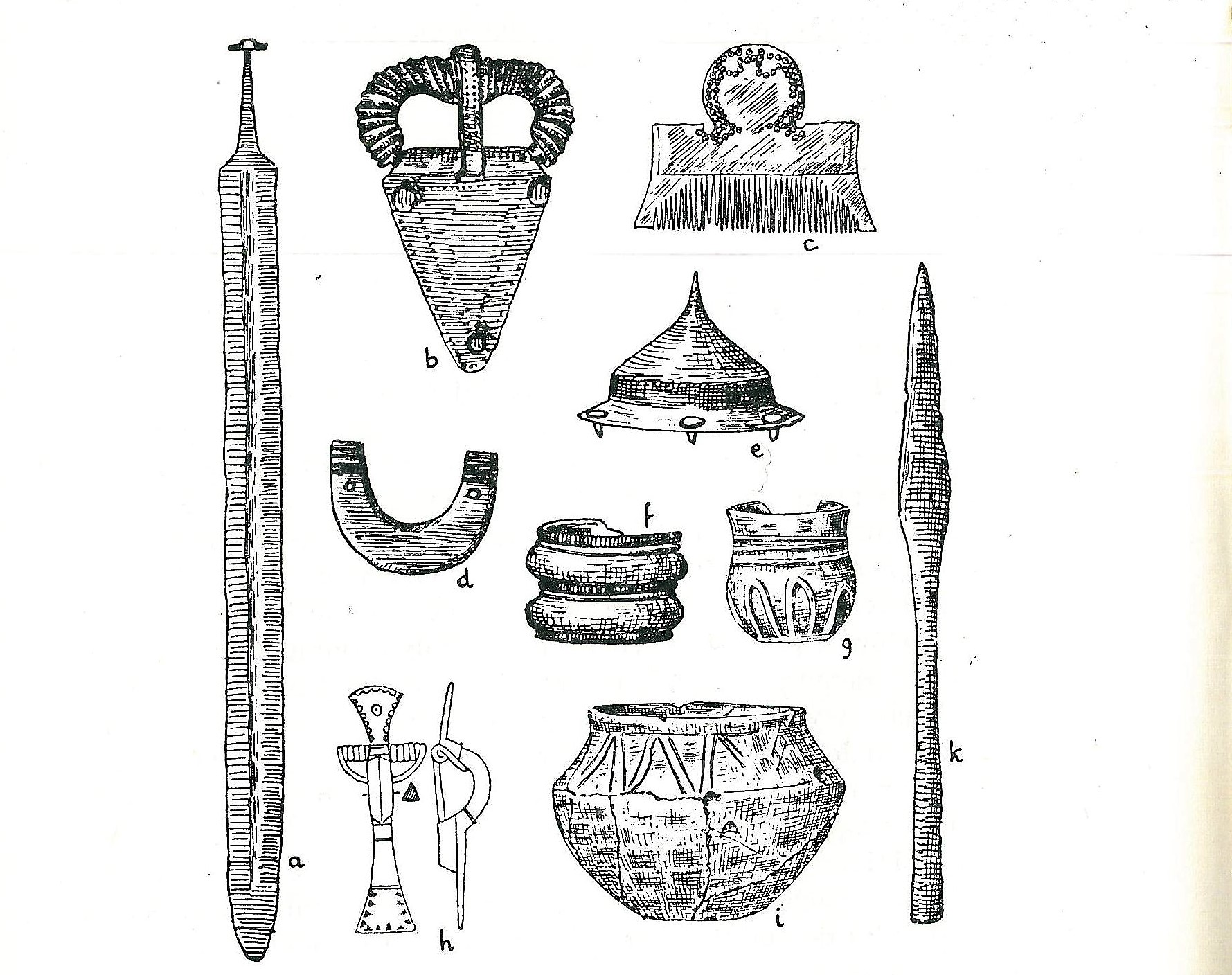

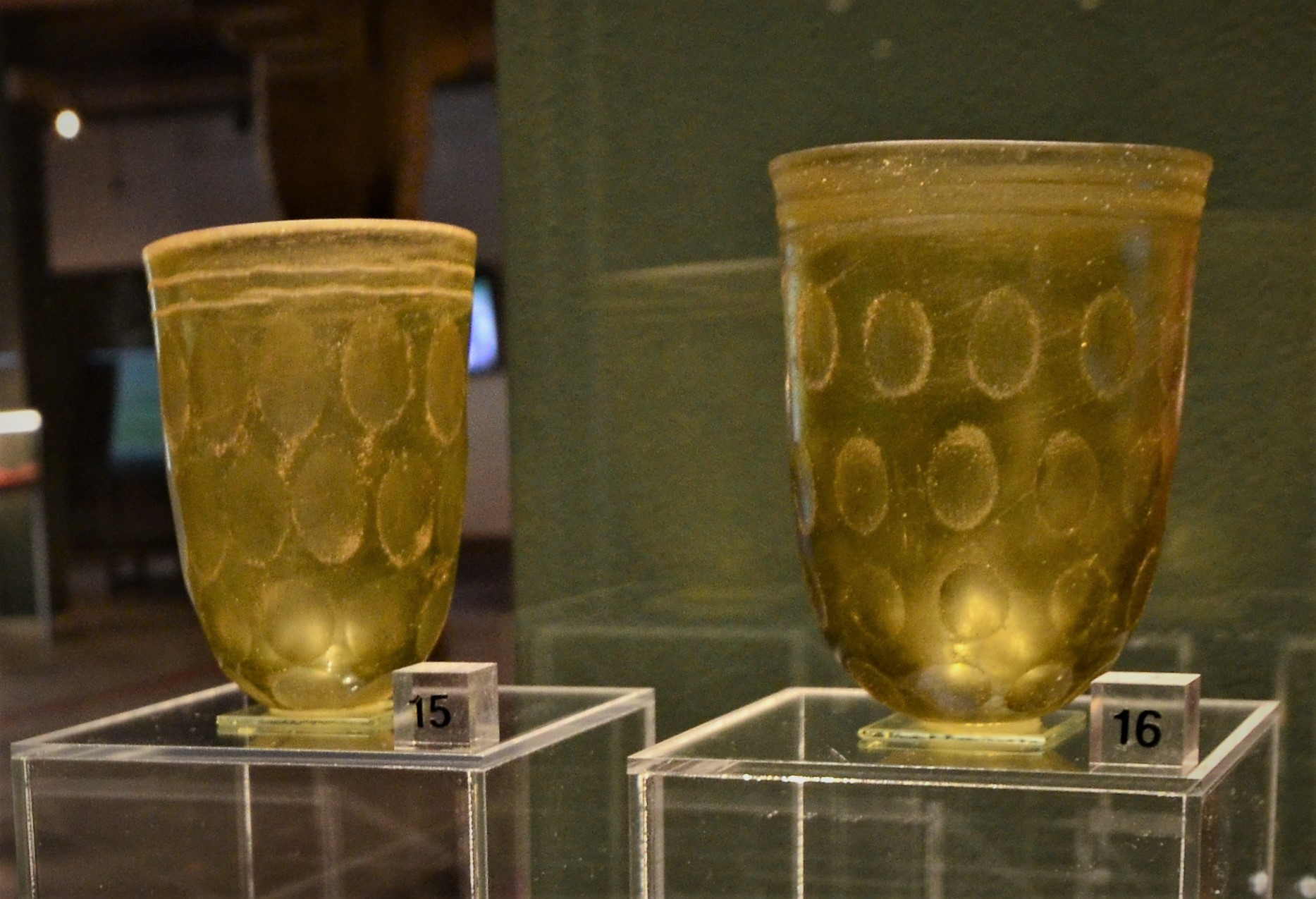

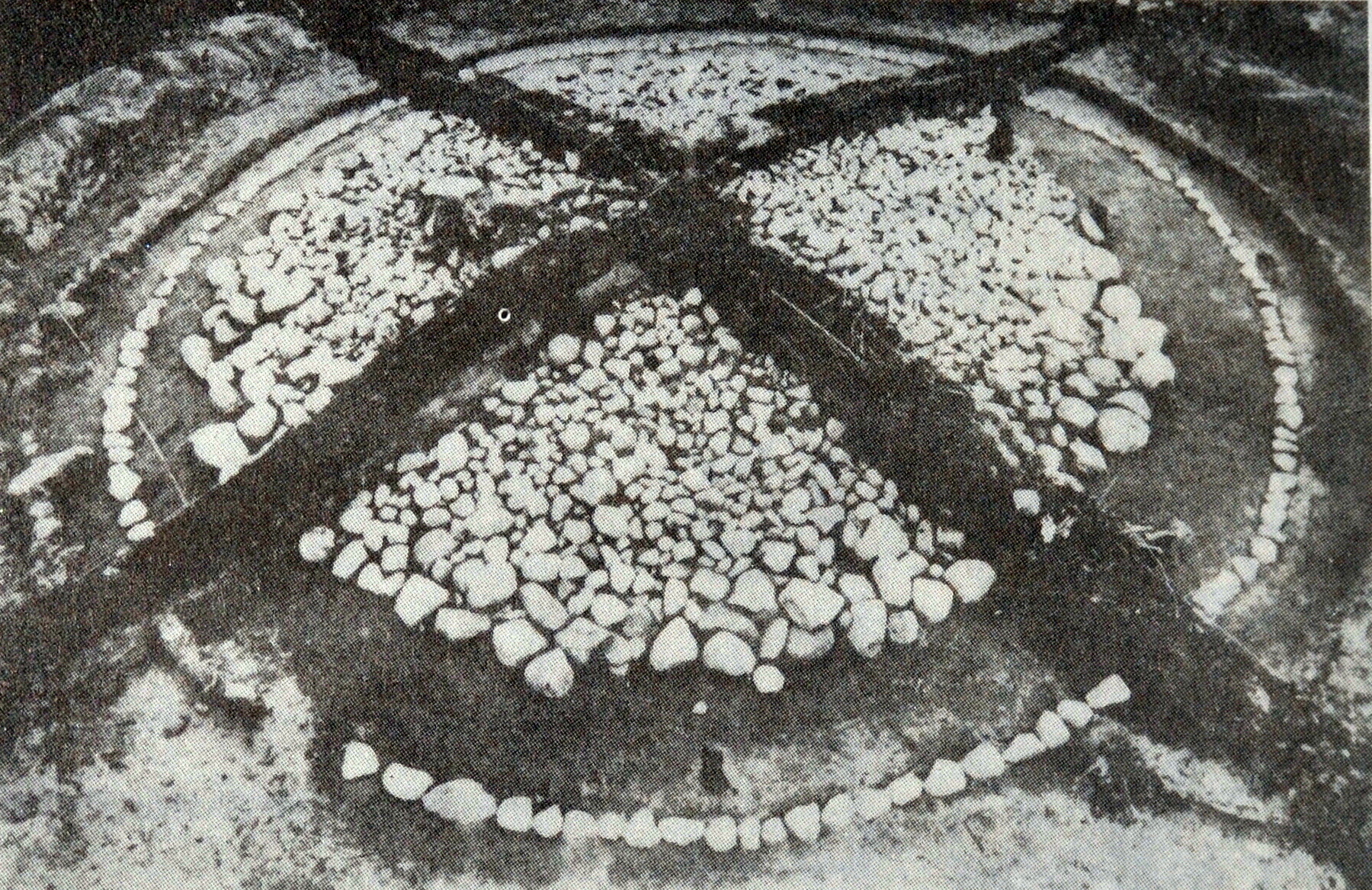

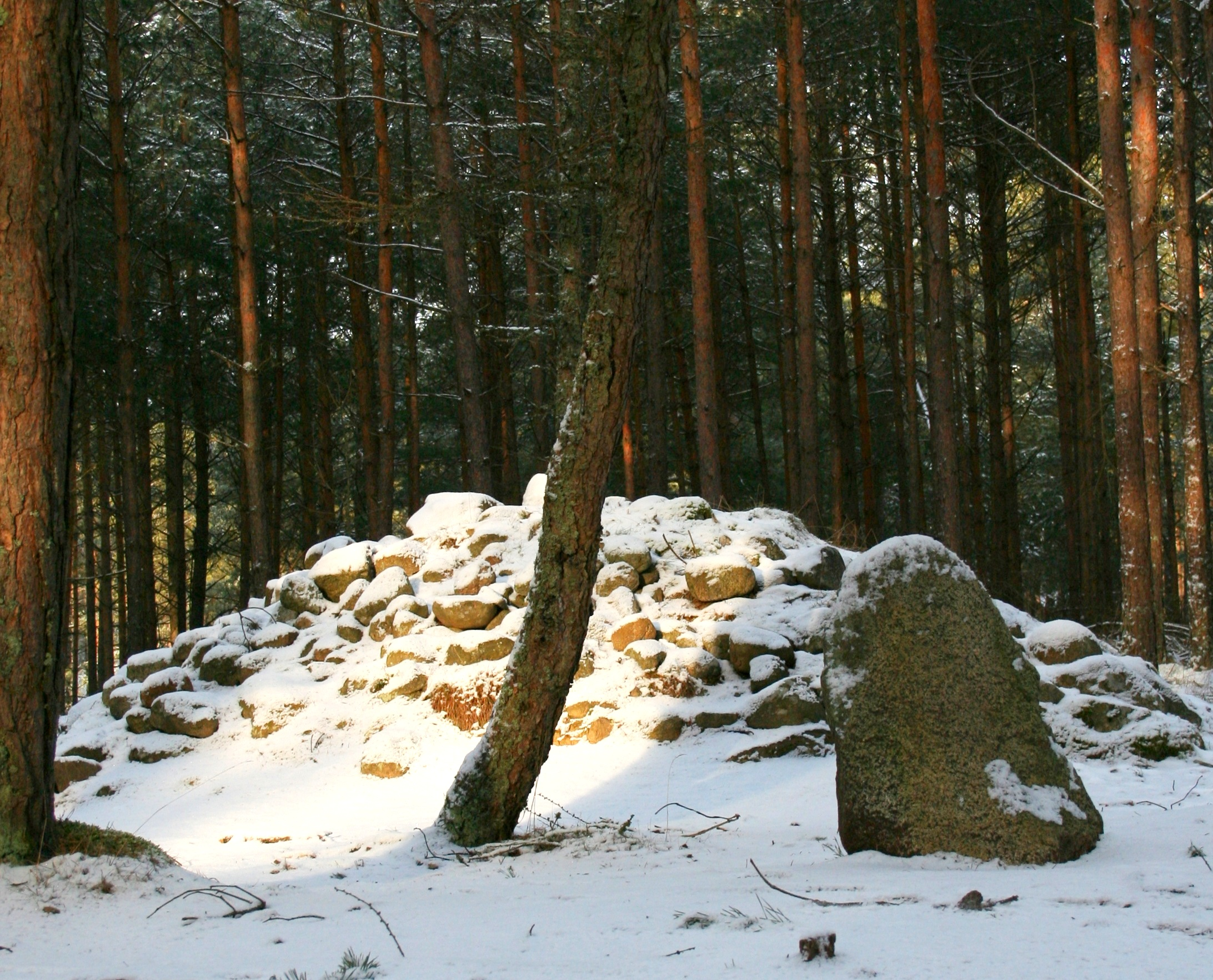

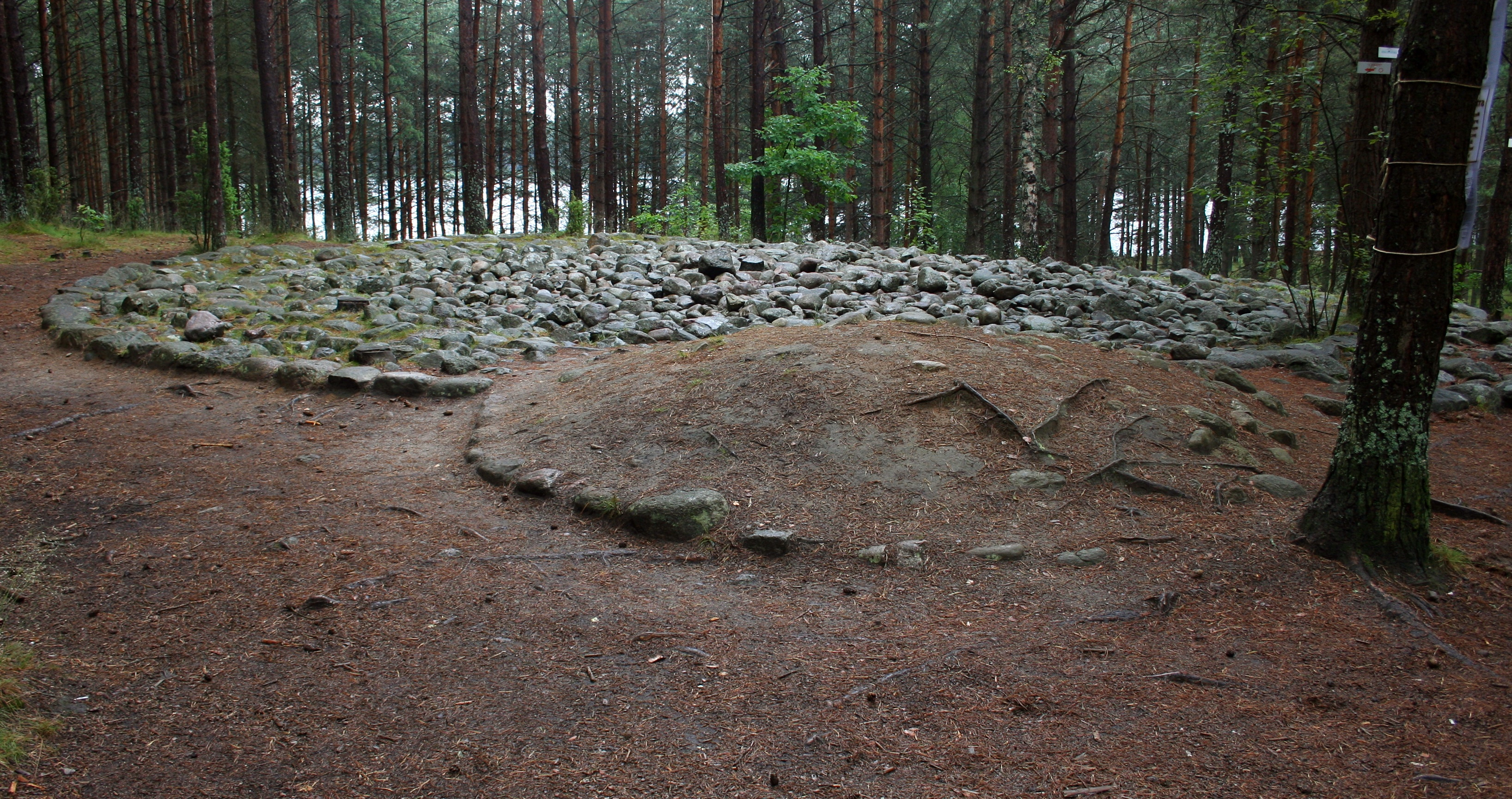

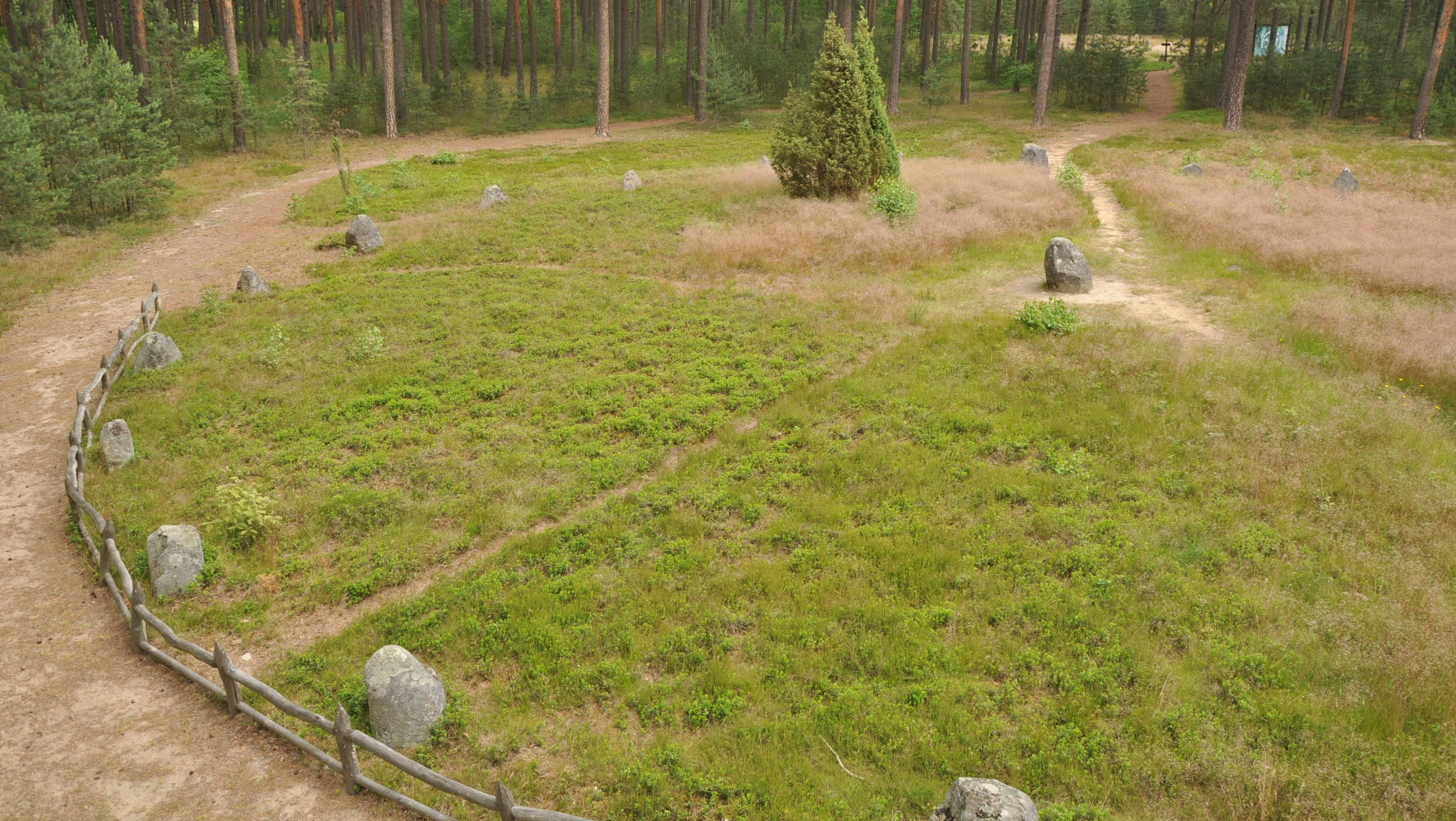

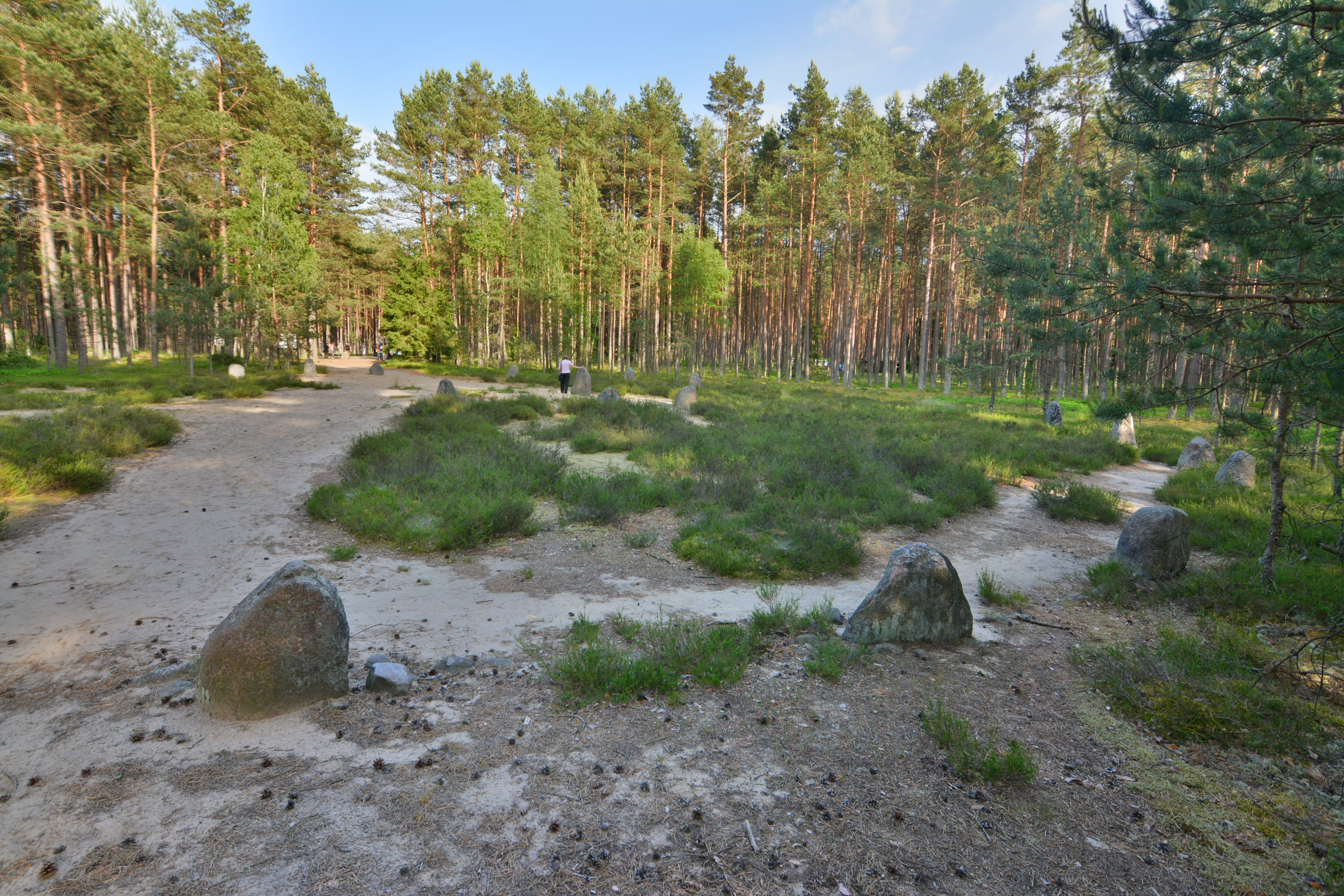

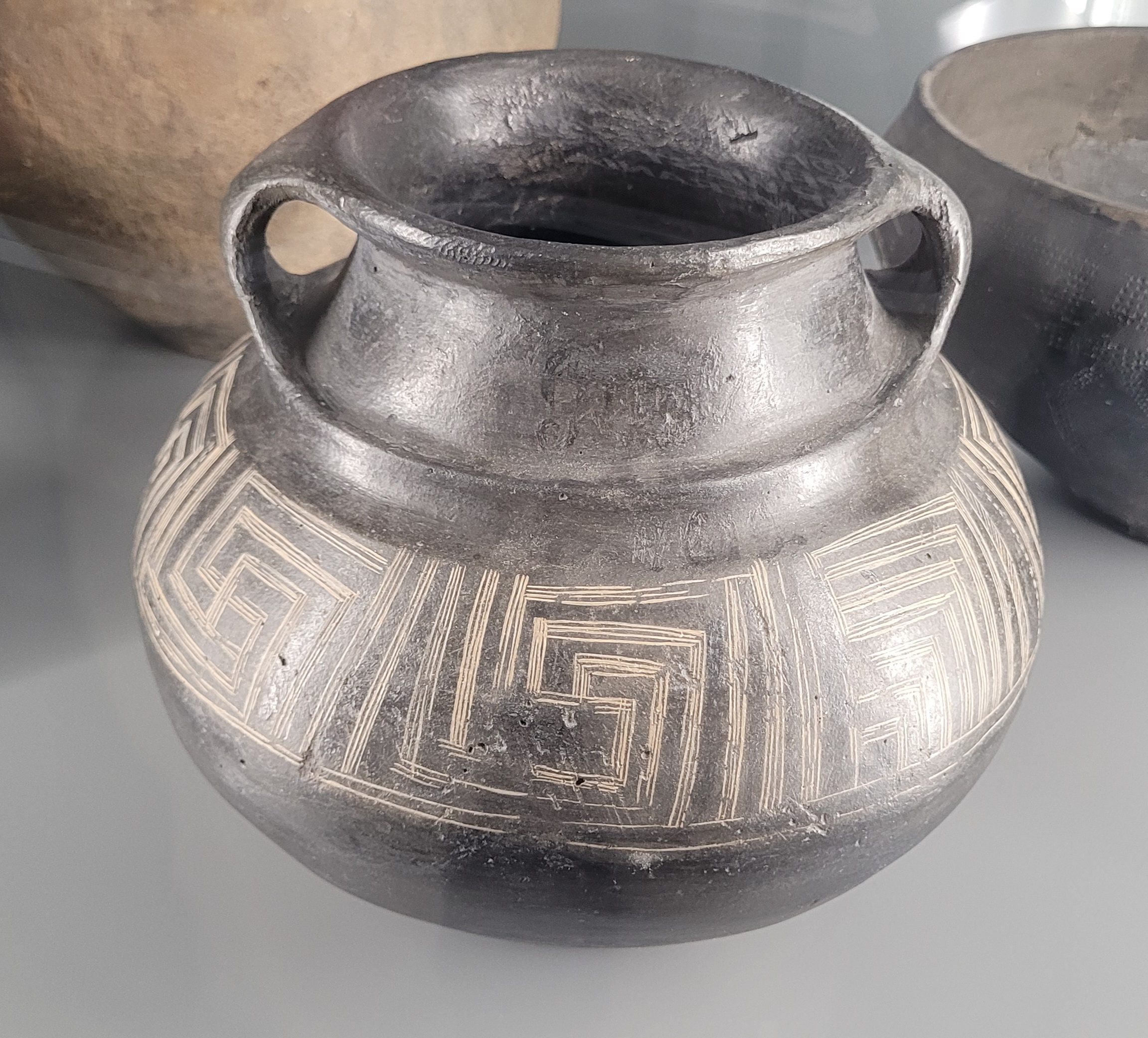
Wielbark pottery

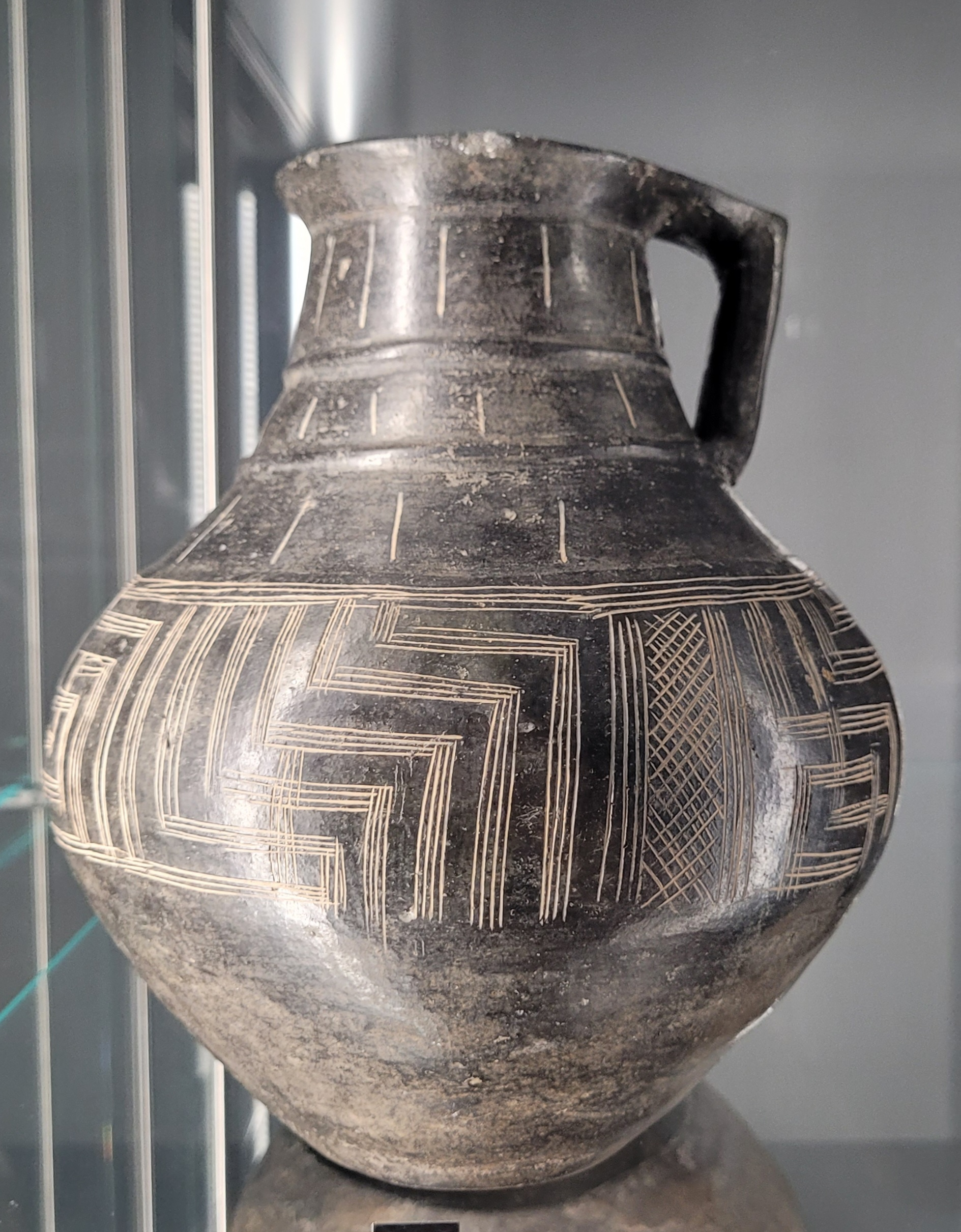
Wielbark pottery

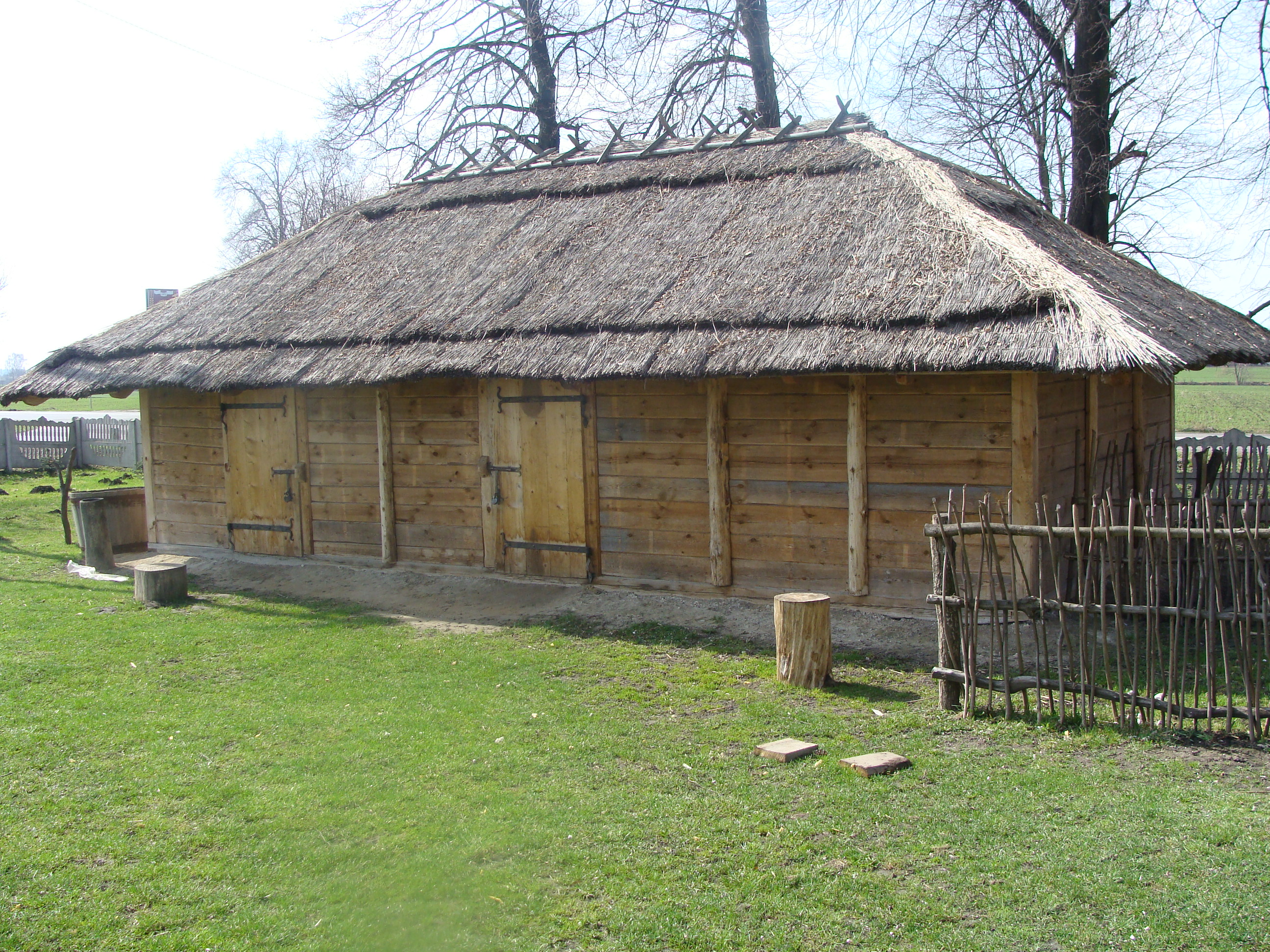

== See also ==
- Migrations of Wielbark and Przeworsk cultures people
- Origins and expansion of the Wielbark culture
- Wielbark culture and burials

== Sources ==
- Andrzejowski, Jacek (2019), "The Gothic migration through Eastern Poland – archaeological evidences", in Cieśliński; Kontny (eds.), Interacting Barbarians. Contacts, Exchange and Migrations in the First Millennium AD, Neue Studien zur Sachsenforschung, vol. 9, Warszawa-Braunschweig, pp. 227–239
- Cieśliński, Adam (2016), "The society of Wielbark culture, AD 1‒300", in Rzeszotarska-Nowakiewicz (ed.), The Past Societies. Polish lands from the first evidence of human presence to the Early Middle Ages. 500BC‒500AD, vol. 4, Warszawa, pp. 217‒255
- Halsall, Guy (2007). Barbarian Migrations and the Roman West, 376–568. Cambridge and New York: Cambridge University Press. ISBN 978-0-52143-543-7.
- Heather, Peter; Matthews, John (1991). The Goths in the Fourth Century. Liverpool University Press. ISBN 978-0-85323-426-5.
- Heather, Peter (2010). The Fall of the Roman Empire. Pan Macmillan. ISBN 978-0-330-52983-9.
- Heather, Peter (2012a). Empires and Barbarians: The Fall of Rome and the Birth of Europe. Oxford University Press. ISBN 978-0-19-989226-6.
- Heather, Peter (2012b). "Goths". In Hornblower, Simon; Spawforth, Antony; Eidinow, Esther (eds.). The Oxford Classical Dictionary (4th ed.). Oxford University Press. ISBN 978-0-19-173525-7.
- Juras, Anna (22 October 2014). "Ancient DNA Reveals Matrilineal Continuity in Present-Day Poland over the Last Two Millennia". PLOS One. 9 (10) e110839. PLOS. Bibcode:2014PLoSO...9k0839J. doi:10.1371/journal.pone.0110839. PMC 4206425. PMID 25337992.
- Kaliff, Anders (2001). Gothic connections: Contacts between eastern Scandinavia and the southern Baltic coast 1000 BC-500 AD. Uppsala University. ISBN 91-506-1482-7.
- Kulikowski, Michael (2006). Rome's Gothic Wars: From the Third Century to Alaric. Cambridge University Press. ISBN 978-1139458092.
- Makiewicz, Tadeusz [in Polish]. "The Goths in Greater Poland". pl:Muzeum Archeologiczne w Poznaniu. Archived from the original on 14 April 2012.
- Maczynska, Magdalena; Rudnicka, Dorota (2004). "Ein Grab mit römischen Importen aus Czarnówko, Kr. Lêbork (Pommern)" [A grave with Roman imports from Czarnówko, Lębork district, Pomerania, Poland] (PDF). Germania. 88 (2). Verlag Henrich Editionen. Archived from the original (PDF) on 7 August 2007.
- Murdoch, Brian; Read, Malcolm Kevin (2004). Early Germanic Literature and Culture. Boydell & Brewer. ISBN 1-57113-199-X.
- Piontek, Janusz (January 2007). "Odontological Analysis of Central European Populations from the Roman Period and the Early Middle Ages". Humanbiologia Budapestinensis. 30: 77–86.
- Rau, Andreas (2018). "Wielbark Culture". In Nicholson, Oliver (ed.). The Oxford Dictionary of Late Antiquity. Oxford University Press. ISBN 978-0-19-174445-7.
- Stolarek, Ireneuz (6 February 2018). "A mosaic genetic structure of the human population living in the South Baltic region during the Iron Age". Nature Communications. 8 (2455). Nature Research: 2455. Bibcode:2018NatSR...8.2455S. doi:10.1038/s41598-018-20705-6. PMC 5802798. PMID 29410482.
- Stolarek, Ireneuz (1 May 2019). "Goth migration induced changes in the matrilineal genetic structure of the central-east European population". Nature Communications. 9 (6737). Nature Research: 6737. Bibcode:2019NatSR...9.6737S. doi:10.1038/s41598-019-43183-w. PMC 6494872. PMID 31043639.
- Wolfram, Herwig (1988) [Originally published in German, 1980]. History of the Goths. Translated by Dunlap, Thomas J. University of California Press. ISBN 978-0-520-05259-8.
- Zenczak M, Handschuh L, Juras A, Marcinkowska-Swojak M, Philips A, Piontek J, Stolarek I, Figlerowicz M (2017). "Y-chromosome haplogroup assignment through next generation sequencing of enriched ancient DNA libraries". Anthropological Genetics.
