= Burgundians =

Roman-era Germanic peoples

Kingdom of the Burgundians in around 500

The Burgundians (Latin: Burgundiones or less commonly Burgundii) were a Germanic people of the Roman imperial era. In the fifth century they established the powerful Kingdom of the Burgundians within the Roman empire in what is now western Switzerland and south-eastern France. Burgundian rule of the kingdom ended when it was incorporated into the Frankish empire in 534, but they are the source of later names related to the nearby region now known as Burgundy, including medieval entities such as the Duchy of Burgundy. In earlier periods, Burgundians were also reported by Roman sources to have lived in regions now within Germany and Poland, and there are probably connections between these and the later Burgundian kingdom.

The kingdom's core group were non-Roman soldiers under the leadership of the Gibichung dynasty, who had previously held a kingdom as foederati in Roman territory on the Rhine border, probably near Worms in present day Germany. The kingdom on the Rhine was destroyed when the Romans and their Hun allies killed many of the Burgundians along with their king Gundahar in 436, accusing them of rebellion. The death of Gundahar at the hands of the Huns became a central theme in medieval Germanic heroic legend, including the Nibelungenlied (where he is "Günther") and the Völsunga saga (where he is "Gunnar"). After the remnants resettled in Sapaudia near Lake Geneva in about 443, their territory expanded to include the regional Roman capital of Lyon, which subsequently became the new Burgundian capital.

The Burgundians are one of the so-called "disappearing and reappearing tribes" listed by historian Peter Heather, appearing in early Roman records in one place, only to reappear much later in another place. The earliest Burgundians mentioned by Greco-Roman writers lived near the Vistula river in present day Poland, between the first and third century. Roman panegyrics reported that in the late third century these Burgundians suffered devastating defeats against the eastern European Gepids and Goths, and modern scholars believe this may have induced some of them to move west in this period, closer to the empire, including those who lived near the Main in the third century.

Although they used Germanic language and customs when they arrived in Sapaudia, the non-Roman soldiers led by the last Gibichungs had diverse origins. There are also indications in Greco-Roman accounts that the forerunners of their core group, the Rhine Burgundians, had seen themselves as descendants of Roman soldiers who had once manned Roman border defences in what is now southern Germany, east of the Rhine. In contrast, older Roman sources described Burgundians living in the region near the Main river only from the third century, initially as invaders and raiders. Both they and their neighbours the Alemanni were previously unattested in this region, much of which had been under Roman control. Archaeological evidence suggests that both these peoples included newcomers from the east, and once they arrived they ruled over populations which were partly Romanised, and partly made up of Germanic tribes who had lived in the same area previously. It was in the fourth century that the Burgundians became allies of the Romans in their conflicts against the Alemanni. In about 406, during a period of wider crisis, when large numbers of armed Alans, Vandals and other peoples from the east migrated through the area on their way to Gaul and Iberia, the Gibichung-led Burgundians also crossed the Rhine, settling on the other side, within the empire.

There are also indications that the much later medieval inhabitants of the Baltic Sea island of Bornholm were also called Burgundi, although there is no indication that they were ever called Burgundiones. Especially in older scholarship, some historians have proposed a connection between these islanders and the continental Burgundi known to the Romans. On the other hand, the shared name could have a topological explanation because these placenames and ethnonyms appear to share a similar etymology, indicating that the places or peoples were high or elevated in some way. A related traditional speculation traces the origins of the Burgundi to what is now Norway, where similar placenames are relatively common. These origin stories are influenced not only by placename similarities, but also by a tradition among early medieval scholars, most notably Jordanes and Paul the Deacon, according to which many barbarian peoples originally migrated south from Scandinavia.

== Name ==
The ethnonym "Burgundians" is commonly used in English to translate the Latin ethnonym Burgundiones, or less commonly Burgundi, to refer to a people or peoples during the Roman era. In English the term "Burgundians" can also refer to inhabitants of various much later medieval or modern polities and regions called Burgundy, which derive their names from the Roman era kingdom. In modern times the only area still referred to as Burgundy (French: Bourgogne) is in France, and it derives its name from the medieval Duchy of Burgundy and County of Burgundy, which are now both within the modern French region of Bourgogne-Franche-Comté. This region was in the northern part of the old kingdom's territory, and does not include the original core of the early medieval kingdom, near Lake Geneva, or its later capital Lyon. In the context of the Late Middle Ages the term "Burgundian" can also refer to the institutions and culture of the Burgundian Netherlands, especially in present-day Belgium, where the Valois Dukes of Burgundy often held court.

Both the main Latin forms of the names appeared throughout the Roman era, and are believed to have the same Germanic etymology, with the main stem *burgund- meaning "high", from earlier Proto-Indoeuropean *bʰérǵʰ with the grammatical suffix *-onts making an adjective. It is probable that the Burgundians were named after a high place or area which was referred to with this name, although their name might have also been describing the Burgundians as high or elevated in some other sense. The long and short forms have different Germanic suffixes, -ja- or -jan-, which are typically used to form nouns for types of people.

Some scholars have argued that the less common short forms of the name are more associated with the small number of references to the "eastern" Burgundians near the Vistula, in the texts of Claudius Ptolemy, Jordanes, and Latin panegyric "11" of 291. Notably, the panegyric even uses the short forms when seeming to refer to eastern events, and the long form for western events. Scholars who have seen this as a sign that these are two distinct peoples have historically included Otto Maenchen-Helfen and Johann Kaspar Zeuss. However, major exceptions to the pattern include Ammianus Marcellinus, who always used the short form to refer to the Rhine Burgundians in the west (which he expressly describes as a name with a local origin). Furthermore, Pliny the Elder and Ptolemy both use the long form in eastern contexts.

Orosius, a contemporary of the Burgundian move across the Rhine and their acceptance into the empire, also gave an etymology for the name. It is not accepted by modern scholars, but it gives an indication of beliefs at the time. He wrote: "In earlier times, when the interior of Germany had been subjugated by Drusus and Tiberius, the adopted sons of Caesar, the Burgundians were stationed at different frontier posts. Later they united to form a great people. They took their name from their stations, for the dwelling places at frequent intervals along the frontier are commonly called burgi."

While this is etymologically incorrect, there may have still been Burgundians stationed in forts near the Rhine frontier in the lifetime of Orosius, and so this story probably projects that situation back in time to create a believable story, which appears to have been widely accepted, even among Burgundians. Already in about 369, when emperor Valentinian was first seeking their alliance against the Alemanni, Ammianus Marcellinus claimed the Burgundians "know that they are descendants of the Romans from ancient times". Although political convenience and Roman propaganda may have been playing a role, this seems to indicate that the Burgundians in any case had no clear alternative origin stories. The etymology given by Orosius was later taken up by Isidore of Seville and Fredegar.

== History ==
=== Vistula Burgundians ===
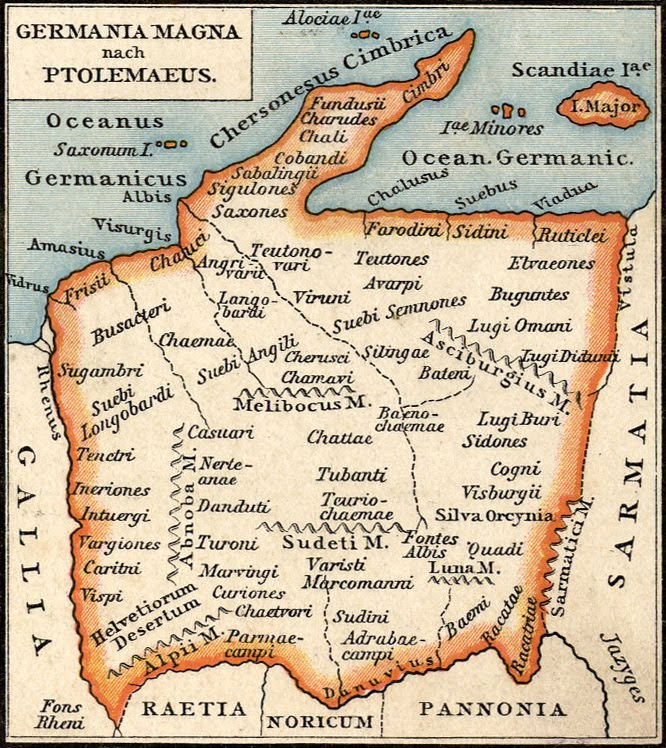
Germania according to Ptolemy, with Vistula as eastern boundary.

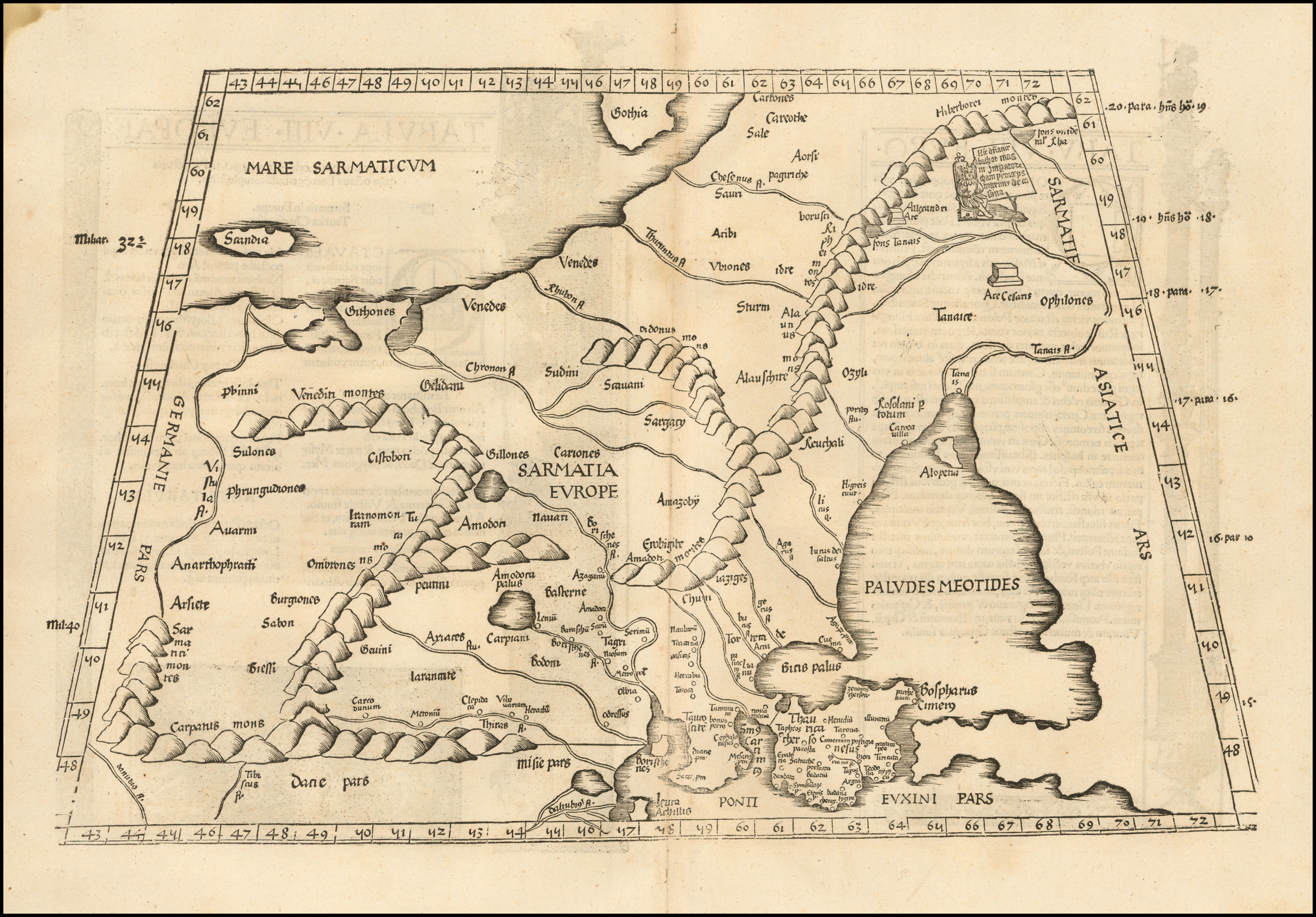
European Sarmatia according to Ptolemy, with Vistula as western boundary.

Burgundians, or at least one or more peoples with the same name, were first described by early Roman writers as living in present-day Poland. In the 1st century AD, Pliny the Elder said there were five types of Germanic peoples (germanorum genera quinque) and the first of these he listed were the Vandili. This group included Burgodiones, Varinnae, Charini, and the Gutones. Pliny gives no exact location but the Gutones and Varini are known from other sources to have lived near the Baltic coast. The Gutones lived near the mouth of the Vistula and are believed to be important contributors to later Gothic culture in the Ukraine region. Modern scholars therefore typically see Pliny's Burgodiones as speakers of East Germanic languages similar to Gothic. Furthermore, because the 6th-century origin story of the Goths written by Jordanes claims that the Goths and Gepids moved from Scandinavia, which he saw as a womb or workshop of barbarian nations, this "Vandili"-category reported by Pliny is also sometimes seen as evidence that the Vistula Burgundians must also have Scandinavian origins.

In the 2nd century the geography of Claudius Ptolemy seems to list the Burgundians twice, in two neighbouring regions, with two different name variants. On the west side of the Vistula, in "Germania", he noted the Βουργοῦνδοι (Ancient Greek, transcribable as Burgundi) living between the Suevus (probably the Oder) and Vistula rivers. To their west lived the powerful Semnones. To their north the Aelvaeones (perhaps Helveconae) were between them and the coastal Rugiclei (perhaps Rugii). To their south the Lugians lived between them and the Western Carpathian mountains. Secondly, east of the Vistula in "Sarmatia", the Burgundians also seem to have been present as the Phrugundiones. Based on this geographical description, scholars believe that the Vistula Burgundians were users of Przeworsk or "cremation-pit" material culture, which is identified by archaeologists in this region and period.

Writing in the 6th century, Jordanes reported that in the 3rd century AD, during the reign of Ostrogotha, Burgundians living near the Vistula basin were almost annihilated (pene usque ad internicionem) by Fastida, king of the Gepids. Jordanes believed the Gepids were living near the mouth of the Vistula prior to this, but seeking new lands to the south. (They would eventually settle in Dacia, which the Romans had abandoned.) The expansionism of Gepids and Goths in this period is a possible reason that archaeological evidence indicates that the Przeworsk culture shifted southwards starting in the second century. Within this archaeological complex, some scholars propose that while some Burgundians remained near the Vistula the main concentration of their settlements was shifting westwards over the Oder river, and that the Luboszyce culture is Burgundian.

The proposal that a Burgundian polity eventually formed with its centre between the Elbe and Oder is therefore based upon this archaeological evidence, and no classical sources including Jordanes report any specific Burgundian presence in this area. Possible support for a Burgundian presence in this region is sometimes seen as coming from the report in the Origo Gentis Langobardorum, an account of Langobard origins, which says that the migrating Langobards stopped in a land called Vurgundaib – apparently a place named after the Burgundians, located somewhere on the Langobard trek from the Lower Elbe to the Middle Danube.

=== In east and west ===
In 278, Zosimus reported that the Burgundi and Vandals (Ancient Greek: Βουργούνδοις και Βανδίλοις) were defeated by the emperor Probus near a river, during a campaign based upon the Rhine. Some scholars interpret the text to be specifying that this was the Lech river, which enters the Danube from the south in what is now Bavaria, but this reading is uncertain. Neither the Burgundi nor Vandals were previously mentioned in records this far west.

In his Latin panegyric "10" of 289, Claudius Mamertinus subsequently mentioned the Burgundiones et Alemanni as allies who attacked Gaul with a large force in 287 AD, and were defeated by Maximian, when the large size of their force led to famine among the invaders. The Alemanni had taken control of the Agri Decumates on the eastern side of the Rhine already at least a generation earlier, by around 260.

Latin panegyric "number 11" (as it is known to modern scholarship), which was written in 291 AD, mentioned that during the reign of the emperor Maximian (reigned 286-305) the Burgundians were utterly destroyed by the Goths (Gothi Burgundos penitus excidunt, using the short form of the Burgundian ethnonym). The Goths were associated in this period with regions south and east of the Carpathians, and this battle is thought to have involved the eastern Burgundians, near the Vistula. However, the same panegyric continues by saying that the Alemanni "again arm themselves for/as losers" (rursumque pro victis armantur Alemanni), implying that they fought in support of (or perhaps against) the Burgundians after this defeat. The Alemanni in this period were far to the west of the Vistula, in what is now southern Germany, east of the Rhine. Because of the distance between the Goths and Alemanni historians have sometimes argued that the text must be an error, perhaps originally referring to the Alans. However, this same panegyric goes on to mention that in this same period the Burgundians took farmland from the Alemanni (Burgundiones Alamannorum agros occupauere, using the longer -iones name), which the Alemanni were still trying to recover in 291. This panegyric therefore appears to associate the same Burgundians with a defeat in the east by the Goths, and a victory in the west against the Alemanni.

Panegyric "10" taken together with panegyric "11" of 291 may represent a series of conflicts in which violence in the east pushed the Burgundians westwards, and involved them with the Alemanni and Romans. The Alemanni clearly worked as allies of Burgundians on at least one occasion, but later came into conflict when the Burgundians started taking over Alemanni farmlands. It is possible that eastern Burgundians were also already beginning to settle permanently in the Main river area, already before the Gothic defeat. The lands they entered may have included territory that some Alemanni were no longer attending because of their own moves westward into the Agri Decumates.

=== Neighbours of the Alemanni ===
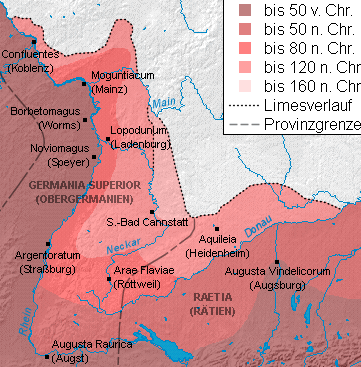
Territories conquered by Rome between Rhine and Danube.

The Laterculus Veronensis, written in about 314, places the Burgunziones between the Alemanni and the Chatti, who were historically present north of the Main river, although this is one of the last mentions of them. This was a listing of barbarian peoples who had supposedly been under imperial control at some point. This adds to the impression that Burgundians had been living close to the Alemanni in the third century, and probably somewhere near the Main and its tributaries.

In 359 contemporary historian Ammianus Marcellinus reported that the future emperor Julian the Apostate began a campaign at Mainz, where the Main enters the Rhine, and travelled through Alemanni lands until they reached border stones marking the edge of Burgundian territory. There are two interpretations of the text, which says either that the boundary was between "Alemanni and the Burgundians" (Alamannorum et Burgundiorum), or between "Romans and the Burgundians" Romanorum et Burgundiorum. According to the interpretation of Hans H. Anton the second version is correct, and the Alemanni were living within the Agri Decumates, which had been Roman, and which still had a Roman population; the boundary between Burgundians and Alemanni was approximately where the old Romes border (limes) had been. Ammianus says the place was called "Capillacii or Palas", and scholars have proposed that this may be near Öhringen. More generally there is archaeological evidence in this period which links the population east of the old limes with burial customs and materials previously found in later phases of the Przeworsk culture.

Orosius reported that the Burgundians, "a new enemy with a new name, numbering, it is said, more than eighty thousand armed men", settled on the banks of the Rhine (ripae Rheni fluminis insederunt), during the reign of the Emperor Valentinian I, who reigned 364-375. He believed they were moving from old Roman frontier forts where their ancestors had been posted. In 369/370, Valentinian enlisted the aid of the Burgundians in his own war against the Alemanni, and their king Macrianus. In this context, Ammianus wrote an extended digression about the Burgundians, which gives insight into their language and customs: He explained that the emperor "finally settled on the plan of stirring up the Burgundians against them — warlike and abounding in the strength of a vast youth population, and therefore feared by all their neighbours".

10 He wrote frequently to their kings through certain discreet and trustworthy messengers, asking that they, at an appointed time, should fall upon the Alemanni. He promised that he himself, after crossing the Rhine with Roman troops, would meet the frightened enemy — taken by surprise as they tried to avoid the weight of arms.
11 The princes received the emperor's letters gladly, for two reasons: first, because the Burgundians knew that from ancient times they were descended from the Romans; second, because they had often quarrelled with the Alemanni over salt works and boundaries. So they sent out their choicest companies, which, before the Roman soldiers had assembled in one body, advanced as far as the banks of the Rhine. There, while the emperor was occupied with building defensive works, they became a source of great alarm to our troops.
12 But after delaying for a short while — when neither did Valentinian, as he had promised, arrive on the appointed day, nor did they see any of the promises fulfilled — they sent envoys to the imperial court, requesting that assistance be given them for their return home, so that they would not be left to expose their unprotected backs to the enemy.
13 When they realized, through evasions and delays, that this would be refused, they departed in sadness and indignation. When the kings learned of this, they raged as if they had been mocked, killed all their captives, and returned to their native lands.
14 Among them, the general title for "king" is Hendinos; and according to ancient custom, he is removed from power if, under his rule, fortune wavers in war or the land refuses to produce abundant crops—just as the Egyptians are accustomed to attribute such misfortunes to their rulers. The highest priest among the Burgundians is called Sinistus; his office is perpetual, and, unlike that of the kings, he is subject to no such dangers.

The mention of a disputed salt spring gives an opportunity for localisation. Anton argues that this must have been in the Kocher valley near Schwäbisch Hall, and that this must have been near the border between the Alemanni and Burgundians. Although the written record is very limited scholars such as Anton, envision the Burgundians gradually changing their position during this period - initially east of the Alemanni, but later gain accessing to the Rhine between present-day Wiesbaden and Mannheim, pushing the Alemanni south of the Neckar river.

In his summing up of the career of Valentinian Ammianus said that it would have been glorious if he had captured King Macrianus, but "he learned with grief and sorrow that the king had escaped from the Burgundians".

Perhaps referring to the same events, Saint Jerome in his Chronicon says under the year 373 that almost 80,000 Burgundians came to the Rhine, which had never happened before. Writing a generation or two later Orosius took over this number of 80,000 Burgundians and he added that they already settled on the Rhine during the reign of Valentinian.

=== Kingdom west of the Rhine ===
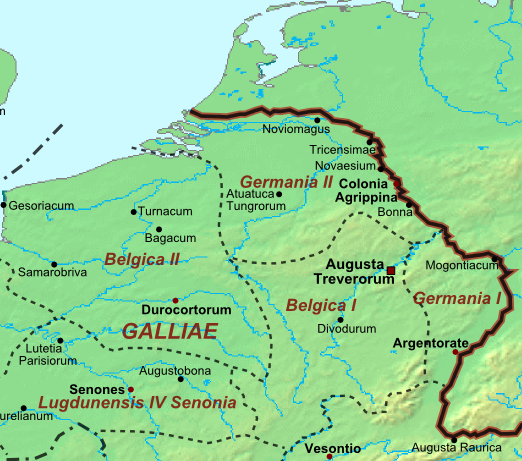
Roman Belgica and Germania

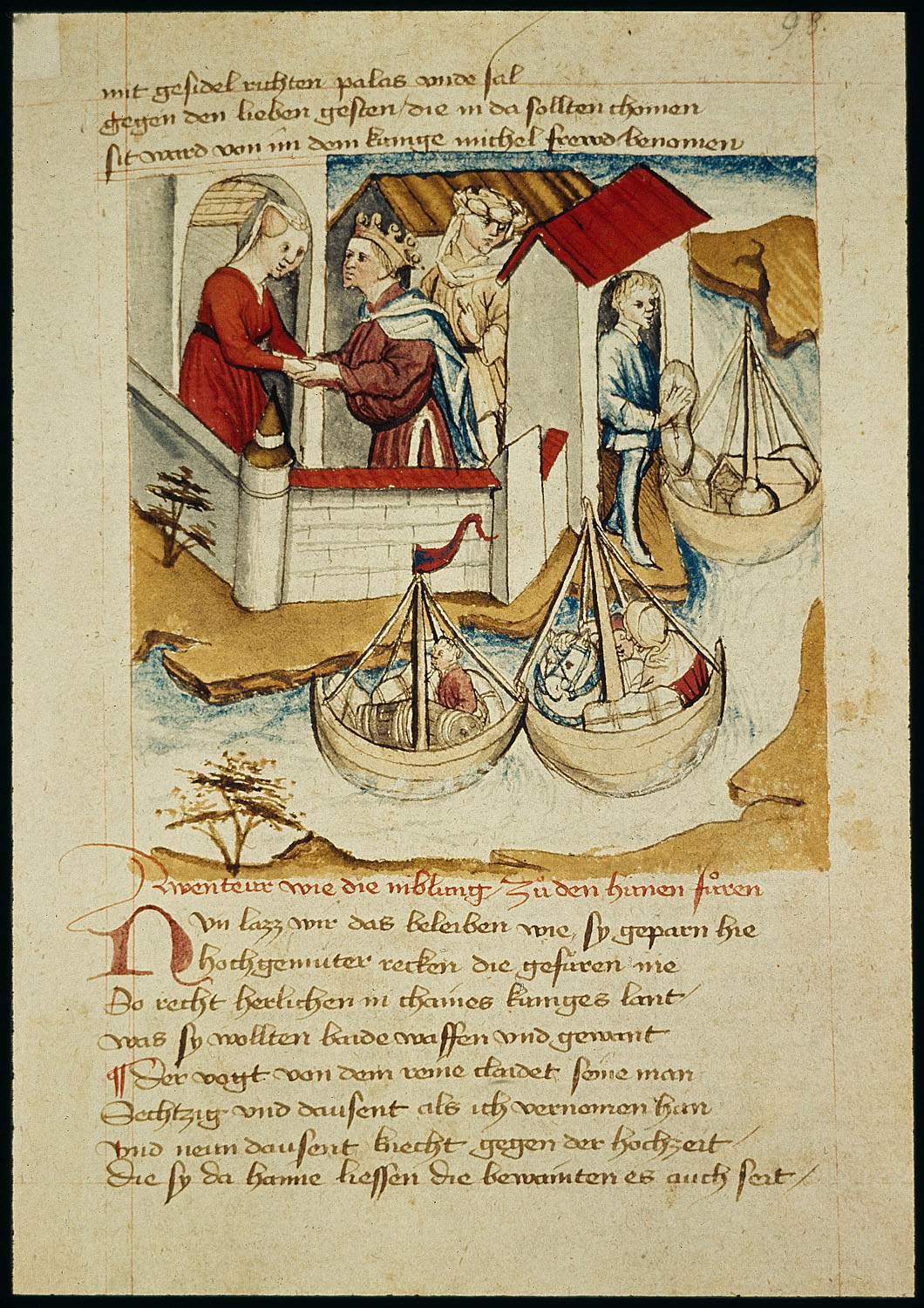
Gunther and the Burgundians prepare to leave for Etzel's court. Hundeshagenscher Kodex

In 409, Saint Jerome first listed the Burgundians as one of the large number of barbarian peoples who, together with Pannonians from with the Roman empire itself, had recently entered Roman Gaul, west of the Rhine:

Countless savage nations (ferocissimae nationes) have overrun the whole of Gaul. Everything between the Alps and the Pyrenees, bounded by the Ocean and the Rhine — the Quadi, Vandals, Sarmatians, Alans, Gepids, Heruli, Saxons, Burgundians, Alamanni, and — Alas for the commonwealth! — Pannonian enemies — have laid waste.

While the entry of long-time neighbours into Gaul such as Saxons, Alamanni and Burgundians was not unprecedented – the Burgundians having lived in the region for more than a century now – the massive movement of peoples from the Pannonian and Middle Danube region was a shocking event, partly triggered by Stilicho's movement of Roman forces from northern Europe to help in conflicts against Goths in the south. The Vandals and Alans in particular made a largescale armed crossing of the Rhine on the last day of 406 and after plundering Gaul many of them crossed further into Hispania where they and a group of Suebi fought for a rebel Roman general Gerontius, and established their own kingdoms in what is now Spain. Orosius claimed that the Burgundians crossed the Rhine driven on by the movement of these Alans and Vandals. Having entered the empire, they stayed there. From this point on Roman writers refer mainly of the Burgundians on the west bank of the Rhine, in Gaul, where it is possible that the main part of their population now lived. Others continued to live east of the Rhine.

Soon after, in 407, a rebel emperor Constantine III was proclaimed, and he set about establishing control in Gaul. After he died in 411, Olympiodorus of Thebes reported that the new Gallic usurper Jovinus was proclaimed emperor by an Alan leader Goar, and the "tribal leader" (phylarch) of the Burgundians named Gundahar. This happened at a place called Mundiacum in Lower Germany (Germania II), which is commonly believed to be Mainz, although that was normally written as Moguntiacum and considered to be part of Upper Germany (Germania I).

In 413, after the death of Jovinus, Prosper of Aquitaine reported that the emperor in Rome, Honorius, now back in control of Gaul, gave the Burgundians a part of it near the Rhine. This may have represented his acceptance of an agreement the Burgundians already had with the usurper regime. The exact position of this Rhine kingdom is uncertain. However, it is this period of Burgundian history which is fictionalised in the Niebelungenlied, which portrays king Gundahar ruling from Worms, south of Mainz, and so this is traditionally seen as the region where they settled. Modern historians interpret Prosper's remark to mean that the Burgundians were confirmed as Roman foederati at this time.

In 430, Socrates of Constantinople, who was a contemporary, reported that a community of Burgundian artisans, who were living peacefully east of the Rhine, were being continually attacked by Huns under the leadership of king Uptar. After they converted to Roman Christianity, and Uptar died, 3000 of these Burgundians were able to kill 10,000 Huns. Scholars believe that King Uptar was the same as Octar, the uncle of Attila. At this time the Huns were allies of Flavius Aetius the Roman general.

In 435, Prosper reported that Aetius crushed Gundahar, "king of the Burgundians dwelling within Gaul, and granted peace to him when he sued for it". However, this "did not hold for long, since the Huns wiped him out together with his people root and branch". The Gallic Chronicle of 452 and Hydatius report under 436 that it was Aetius himself who devastated the Burgundians and killed their king. He adds that the Burgundians had rebelled, and says that in 437, 20,000 Burgundians were slain. The trigger for this slaughter was apparently the Burgundian harassment of the province of Belgica, immediately to the west of Upper Germania, reported by Sidonius in his 7th poem in honour of the future emperor Avitus. According to Sidonius, the young Avitus showed his military prowess in this campaign, while fighting under Aëtius, who had learned the "Scythian" ways of fighting with the Huns. In reality, there may have been a longer-run tensions between Burgundians and the Hunnic allies of Aetius, as reflected in reports of the conflict in 430.

In medieval legends such as the Nibelungenlied, on which Wagner based his Ring Cycle King Gundahar becomes Old High German Günther, and in the Völsunga saga he is Old Norse Gunnar. The king of the Huns who killed him in the story, Etzel or Atli, is based on Attila the Hun, but in the story Günther travels to the kingdom of Attila who is his brother-in-law. In reality, Attila became a joint king of the Huns with his brother Bleda in 435, the same year that the Burgundian conflict with their ally Aetius appears to have begun. Although his uncle Octar apparently died during a campaign near Gaul against Burgundians in 430, it is not known if Attila was directly involved in the real campaign against Gundahar. In the legends, the father of Gundahar was named Gibeche or Gjúki, and this may have been the real name of Gundahar's father, because the 6th-century Lex Burgundionum Gibica is the first name in a list of historical kings.

=== Burgundian settlement near Lake Geneva ===
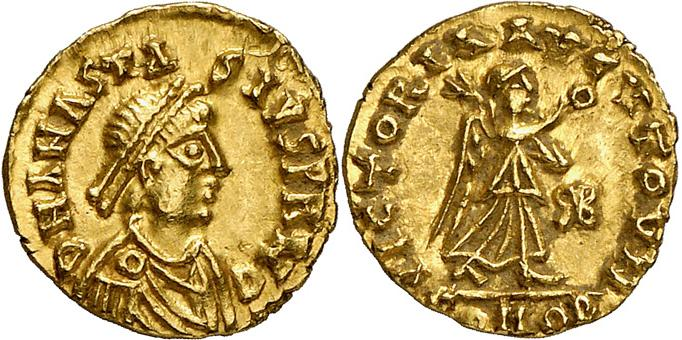
Tremissis of King Gundobad struck in the name of emperor Anastasius

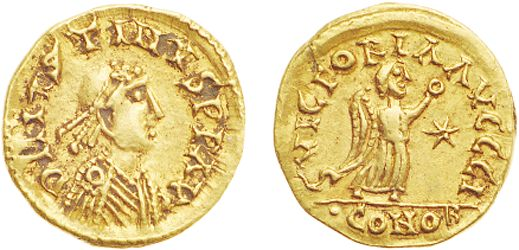
Tremissis of King Sigismund I in the name of emperor Justin I

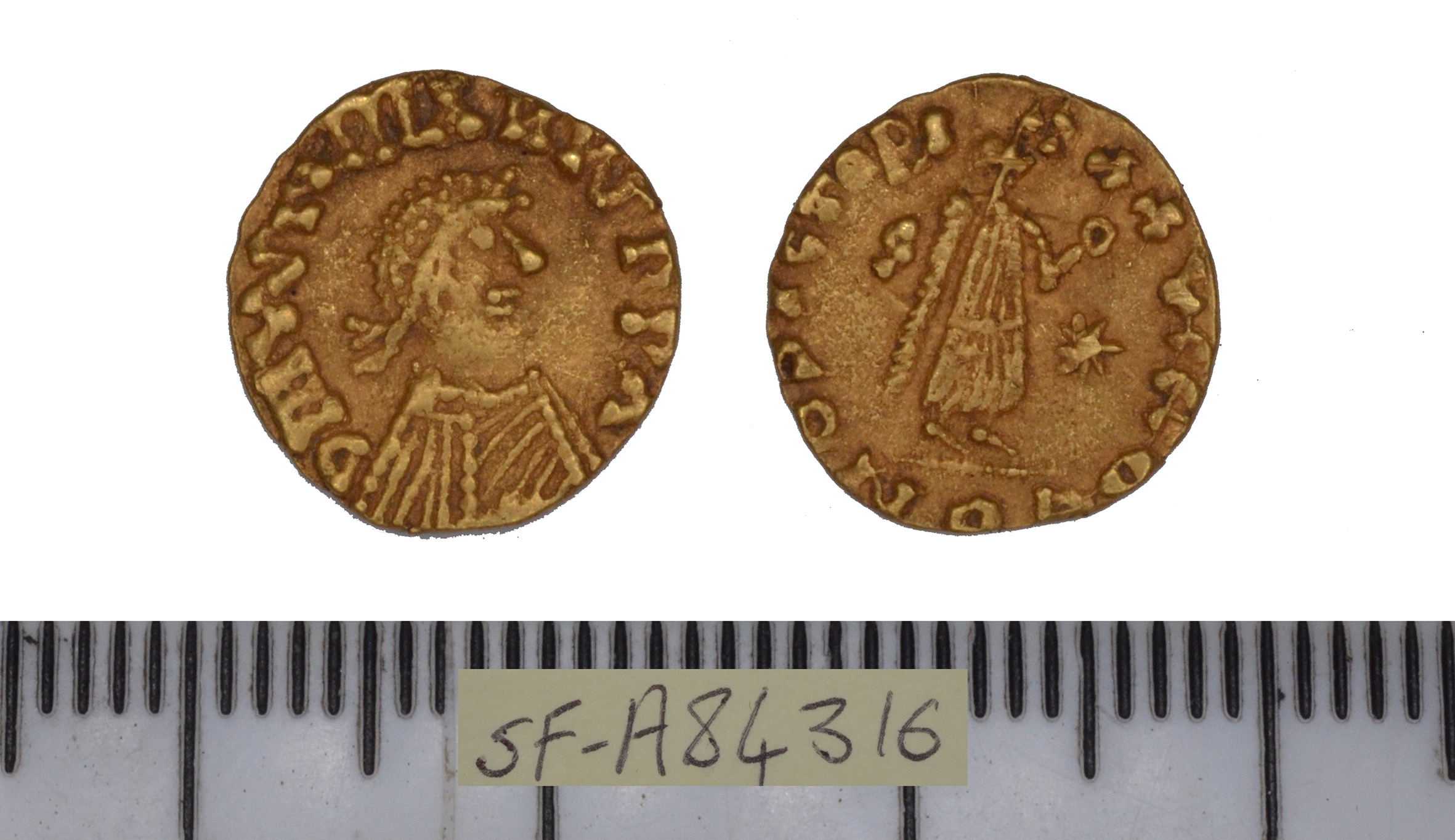
Tremissis in the name of Justinian I, made by Gundomar II

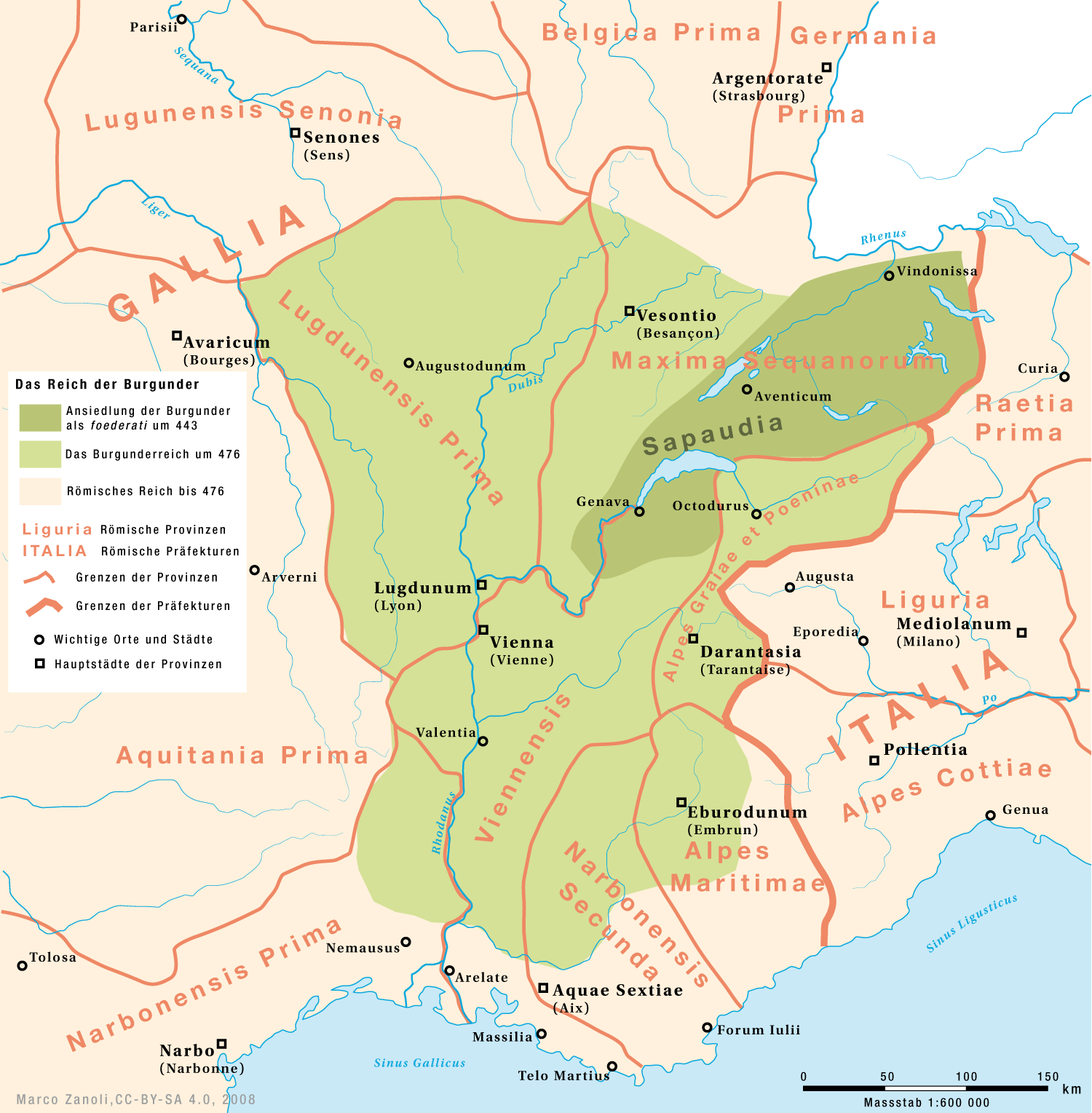
The Second Burgundian Kingdom between 443 and 476

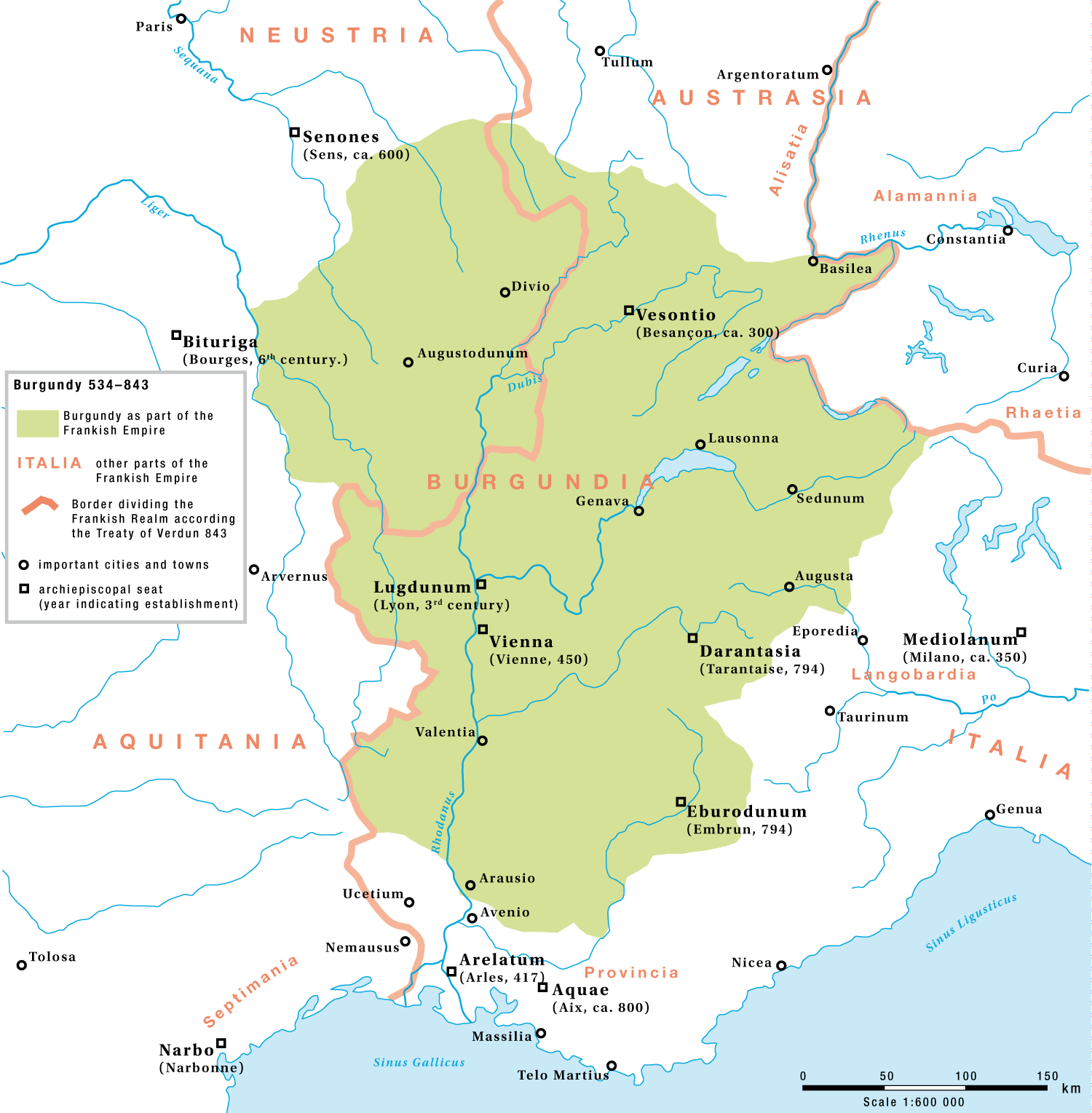
Burgundy as part of the Frankish Empire between 534 and 843

The only source to date the Burgundian settlement near Lake Geneva is the chronologically difficult Gallic Chronicle of 452, which records that in 443 "Sapaudia was given to the remainders of the Burgundians to be divided with the indigenous inhabitants." The exact boundaries of Sapaudia are uncertain, but it lay in the Roman province of Maxima Sequania, and the Burgundian territory included Geneva, and Neuchâtel.

Historian Ian N. Wood notes that this first settlement didn't draw much attention from contemporaries, and probably didn't involve a large migration of Burgundians. According to him the Burgundians settled in Sapaudia can be seen as a Roman military unit. These kings were in fact military officials of the Roman empire. Their non-Roman followers were not all Burgundian, and more non-Burgundians joined over time. In Wood's opinion, a true Burgundian "kingdom" which was not based upon a Roman military office, only emerged between 474 and 494. After the accession of his opponent Julius Nepos in 474 King Gundobad could no longer claim to represent the western imperial court.

The Lex Burgundionum law code, issued under Gundobad, nonetheless invokes earlier kings back to Gundahar, and beyond. One clause confirms the freedom of persons proved to have been freeborn under earlier "predecessors of royal memory" including not only his father and uncle (Gundioc and Chilperic) but also "Gibica, Gundomar, Gislahar, and Gundahar". Whether or not Gundioc was the son, or even descendant, of Gundahar, is not certain. Gregory of Tours reported that Gundioc ("Gundevech") was a descendant of the Tervingian Goth Athanaric.

=== Imperial politics ===
Another clause in the Burgundian legal code voids all unresolved Burgundian legal cases before the "Battle of the Mauriac Plains" (also known as the Battle of the Catalaunian Plains) in 451. This battle was a decisive turning point for the Burgundians, as it was also for the Visigoths. During the battle, Burgundians and other barbarian kingdoms from Gaul fought for Rome under Aetius, and put Attila the Hun and his allies to flight. However, the Visigothic king Theodoric I was killed during the battle, and Thorismund his son followed the advice of Aetius not to pursue the Huns. Near contemporary Sidonius Apollinaris reported that other Burgundians also fought on the Hun side, and these may have been Burgundians living east of the Rhine outside Roman control.

In about 450, around the time of the Battle of the Catalaunian Plains, Gundioc strengthened ties with the future western power-broker Ricimer by marrying his sister, helping to explain later Burgundian–imperial cooperation. At this time Ricimer would not have been a very important or powerful person.

In 454, the Continuatio Prosperi Havniensis surprisingly reports that Burgundians "spread throughout Gaul" (intra Galliam diffusi) but were "driven back" (repelluntur) by the Gepids. The Gepids were one of the most powerful peoples in Attila's alliance, and they had fought at the Catalaunian plains, but their home was far to the east in what is now Rumania, and in 454 they were fighting for their independence after the death of Attila in 453, playing an important role at the Battle of Nedao. Scholars suspect that this passage may be corrupted, and the context is now unclear. Some historians believe that the text originally said that the Burgundians repelled the Gepids.

In 455, after the emperor Petronius Maximus was killed after less than three months in power, and Rome was sacked by the Vandals, the Visigothic king Theodoric II acclaimed the Gallo-Roman noble Avitus as emperor. In 456 the Burgundian kings Gundioc and Chilperic joined Theoderic, king of the Visigoths, on a successful Roman-backed campaign against the Kingdom of the Suebi in Hispania. In October 456 Avitus was overthrown as emperor by Majorian, who became the new emperor, and Ricimer, who became magister militum. Soon after this in 456, Marius Aventicensis reported that the Burgundians "occupied part of Gaul and divided the lands with the Gallic senators". This may have been based on military agreements already made by Avitus, implied by the Burgundian participation in the Suebian campaign. It is also possible that the Gallo-Roman nobility (the senators) didn't accept the new regime in Rome, and wanted to take their defence into their own hands. In 457, when the Burgundian soldiers returned from Hispania, some may have now been garrisoned in Lyon. The Continuatio Prosperi Havniensis also reported that after the death of the Suebian king in Spain, "Gundioc, king of the Burgundians, with his people and all his forces, entered Gaul to settle", with Gothic approval and friendship.

Majorian asserted himself in Gaul in 458, occupying Lyon and apparently ejecting a Burgundian garrison. After Majorian's assassination in 461, Ricimer's dominance allowed Burgundian influence to grow again. Gundioc, his brother-in-law was recognised as magister militum for Gaul, and Burgundian territory expanded along the Rhône valley.

In 469, Sidonius reported that his own uncle and fellow Gallo-Roman noble named Arvandus, suggested dividing Gaul between the Goths and Burgundians. However, he was convicted for treason for his remarks.

Gundioc died in about 470, succeeded by his brother Chilperic I, who repelled a Visigothic advance in 471, and fought the Alemanni on the northern frontier. In 472, Ricimer and Gundioc's son Gundobad killed Emperor Anthemius; Ricimer's death shortly afterwards left Gundobad in control at Rome, where he installed Glycerius as emperor. Glycerius was deposed in 474, and after this major setback, Gundobad returned to Burgundy, dividing the kingdom with his brothers Godigisel, Chilperic II, and Gundomar I.

=== Independent kingdom ===
After the death of Chilperic I around 480, his nephew Gundobad became principal king, while sharing power in Burgundian fashion with his brothers Godegisel, Chilperic II, and Godomar I.

Civil war broke out in 500 when Godegisel allied with his brother-in-law Clovis I of the Franks, leading to Gundobad's defeat at Dijon. With Visigothic support, Gundobad regained control in 501, killing Godegisel and the Frankish garrison in Vienne.

Gundobad restored ties with Clovis and joined the Frankish war against the Visigoths in 507, although they probably did not fight at the Battle of Vouillé itself. The Burgundians gained temporary conquests in Provence and raided as far as Toulouse and Barcelona. Ostrogothic intervention from Italy soon pushed them back, and the Durance was fixed as their southern frontier. The Burgundians emerged almost empty-handed, while the Franks and Ostrogoths made substantial gains.

Gundobad died in 516, leaving the throne to his Catholic son Sigismund, whose reign was marked by close cooperation with Avitus of Vienne, and the foundation of Agaune abbey in 515.

In 523–524, after Sigismund executed his son Sigeric, a grandson of Theoderic the Great, the Burgundians faced a two-front war against the Ostrogoths and the sons of Clovis. Sigismund was captured and killed, but his brother Godomar II rallied and defeated the Franks at the Battle of Vézeronce. A new alliance with the Ostrogoths could not however prevent a renewed Frankish assault in 532–534, which ended Burgundian independence. Their kingdom was absorbed into the Frankish realms, though a Burgundian identity survived under Merovingian rule.

=== Burgundaefarones ===
In the Merovingian period, the Franks ruled a large empire that contained many of the original post-Roman kingdoms including that of the Burgundians. Surviving written sources from this era mention people within the Frankish empire who were of Burgundian descent. A handful of people were described as belonging to the gens Burgundionum, and on some of these occasions this seems to have significance concerning legal rights. A special term Burgundaefarones was used mainly by Fredegar to refer to the leading men of Burgundy, although normally without any clear ethnic significance. In the hagiography of Saint Sigismund (Passio Sigismundi) this same term is given as the original name of the ancestral Burgundians who supposedly once manned the Roman front line forts in southern Germany.

== Law ==
The Burgundians left several legal codes, which give the "fullest evidence for the context and process of legislation in the earliest years of the successor states" which came into existence at the end of the Western Empire.

Already in the time of Gundioc the letters of Sidonius make it clear that Syagrius, a friend and fellow Gallo-Roman noble, was working with the Burgundian court to write legal codes. There are also indications that Gundobad published edicts concerning the Burgundian population, and their interaction with the Gallo-Roman population, and also Roman law, the Lex Romana Burgundionum which is also called the Forma et Expositio Legum.

Gregory of Tours, said that Gundioc's son Gundobad published new edicts after the civil war against his brother in 500. These were intended to help the Roman citizens, and stop them being treated badly by the Burgundians.

In the Carolingian era Saint Agobard, who was a bishop at Lyon, wrote a diatribe against the continuing existence of the distinct legal code for Burgundians, which he called the Lex Gundobada, or Gundobad's law, which is taken by some to imply that Gundobad produced the main laws of the Burgundian code. He argued that everyone should live under one Frankish legal code. According to Ian Wood: "For Agobard those subject to this law were a particularly quarrelsome group, who would not solve legal disputes through discussion or the testimony of true men, but instead resorted to the use of arms, thus ensuring the dominance of the strongest". From this and other examples it is known that there was still a Burgundian people (gens), who were known to sometimes claim their legal right to trial by combat.

Other evidence indicates that main Burgundian law code, the Liber Constitutionum or Book of Constitutions, or at least a predecessor of it, was issued in 517, in the second year of the reign of Sigismund, the son of Gundobad. However, some of the edicts were clearly made before his reign, in the time of Gundobad, and the exact contents of the laws published in 517 are now uncertain. After 517 the laws were expanded. In its name and style the law is made in the Roman imperial tradition. When the constitutions were made the Burgundian rulers were Roman officials, and did not see themselves as ruling an independent state. The laws are also not only addressed to the non-Roman population, although some parts refer to non-Romans using terms such as populus noster (our people), or barbari (the barbarians, the non- Romans). These were not only Burgundians, but also other non Romans such as Alans or Goths.

The prima constitutio, the first of the constitutions, is an introductory section which is signed by 31 comites or officers of the kingdom, all of who have Germanic names.

== Physical appearance ==
In a letter to a friend who was a senator, the 5th century Gallo-Roman noble, poet and landowner Sidonius Apollinaris, wrote a description of Burgundians who he was staying with. He emphasized, and perhaps exaggerated, the cultural differences between them and himself.

Quid me, etsi valeam, parare carmen	Why do you bid me, though I might be able, to prepare a song
Fescenninicolae iubes Diones	of Dionysus, lover of Fescennine verse,
inter crinigeras situm catervas	when I am placed among shaggy-haired hordes
et Germanica verba sustinentem,	and enduring Germanic words,
laudantem tetrico subinde vultu	praising, now and then with a grim face,
quod Burgundio cantat esculentus,	what a gluttonous Burgundian sings,
infundens acido comam butyro?	pouring rancid butter upon his hair?
vis dicam tibi, quid poema frangat?	Do you wish me to tell you what shatters my poetry?
ex hoc barbaricis abacta plectris	From this, driven off by barbarian strings,
spernit senipedem stilum Thalia,	Thalia scorns the six-foot style [i.e. hexameter],
ex quo septipedes videt patronos.	since she sees seven-foot patrons.
felices oculos tuos et aures	Happy are your eyes and ears,
felicemque libet vocare nasum,	and I am glad to call your nose happy,
cui non allia sordidumque cepe	for whom no garlic and filthy onion
ructant mane novo decem apparatus,	belch forth at early morning from ten dishes,
quem non ut vetulum patris parentem	whom not, as though an old father or a nurse's husband,
nutricisque virum die nec orto	before day has risen
tot tantique petunt simul Gigantes,	so many and such great Giants all at once assail,
quot vix Alcinoi culina ferret.	as scarcely the kitchen of Alcinous could bear.

== Language ==
Little is known of the language or languages of the Burgundians before they integrated into the Romanised populations they lived with, but it is known that the language of the Kingdom based near the Rhone was a Germanic language. Some proper names of Burgundians are recorded, and a small number of words, for example in legal texts. It is, however, difficult to use these words to distinguish what type of Germanic they spoke. It is also highly probable that Burgundian vocabulary and naming was influenced by their neighbours, such as the Alemanni and the Visigoths, particularly when it comes to personal names.

In a letter to a noble Roman friend who he referred to as "a new Solon of the Burgundians in the discussion of laws", the fifth century poet Sidonius Apollinaris referred to the language of Burgundian law, as "Germanic language" (Latin: germanicus sermo). According to Herwig Wolfram, no one in this period would have applied the term Germanic to anything to do with the Gothic peoples. In fact, during this period, the term Germani was normally "either limited to Franks and Alamanni or used for peoples of a distant past". Wolfram has therefore argued that the Burgundians were probably called Germani by Sidonius because of their recent history in Germania.

Earlier Burgundians in present-day Poland probably also spoke some type of Germanic language. Pliny the Elder categorized the earliest Burgundians together with the Gutones and Vandals in the first century AD. For this reason, scholars once assumed that Burgundians were speakers of an East Germanic language, like that later used by Wulfila to create the Gothic Bible. However, this is now considered uncertain, and Herwig Wolfram has written that for "a long time linguists considered the Burgundians to be an East Germanic people, but today they are no longer so sure".

== Christianity ==
Orosius, probably writing about 416/417, wrote that "through the providence of God" the Burgundians in Gaul "all recently become Christians, embracing the Catholic faith and acknowledging obedience to our clergy, so that they live mild, gentle, and harmless lives, regarding the Gauls not as their subjects but in truth as their Christian brethren". Socrates of Constantinople also reported that a population of Burgundians living east of the Rhine, and mainly living as artisans, converted to Catholic Christianity in 430, under the guidance of a bishop based in nearby Roman Gaul.

Nevertheless, the Burgundian court in Geneva and Lyon had an Arian faction, which held sway over some of the kings including Gundobad. On the other hand, unlike the Gothic and Vandal kingdoms, and perhaps more like the Frankish court before the baptism of Clovis, the Burgundian court also had Catholics, including several of the female members of the family. Clovis himself was said to have been converted by his Burgundian wife. A notable exception to the pattern was King Sigismund, who converted to Catholicism, and was known for his dedication to it.

== Medieval Scandinavian origins myth ==
The medieval hagiography of Sigismund of Burgundy (died 524), which was probably written in the 8th century, claimed that the Burgundians of southern France originated, before they lived in southern Germany, on the northern island called "Scanadavia" (sic). According to this account, the emperor Tiberius, who reigned 14-37 AD, settled them in Germany. This passage was also copied into the second hagiography of the Burgundian Saint Gangulphus. The apparent sources of this story have been discussed by modern scholars.

- The idea that the Burgundians descended from people stationed in Roman frontier forts in southern Germany was already mentioned by Ammianus in the 4th century, but he did not make any claims about when they were settled, or about how the Burgundians got their name. For him this story was politically important, connected to the idea that the Burgundians should ally with the Romans against their neighbours the Alemanni. In his time the Burgundians literally lived in the area of the old Roman frontier in southern Germany, which was a border the Romans were still very conscious of and aimed to reclaim, although the Alemanni stood in the way.
- The involvement of the emperor Tiberius in the supposed Burgundian settlement of the Roman frontier forts (burgi) in Southern Germany, which they were supposedly named after, was originally mentioned by the 5th century writer Orosius, but Orosius did not mention Scandinavia. Orosius knew and mentioned that this region of Germania where the Burgundians had recently been living in his time had originally been subjugated by Rome in the time of Tiberius, and he also added the explanation of their name. Before coming to the forts, they were therefore not called Burgundians in this account.
- The mention of Scandinavia as a place where the border guards originated in another tradition. It did not appear in Orosius, or 7th-century writers such as Fredegar or Isidore, who also copied Orosius, but were earlier than the Sigismund hagiography. It is one of several such medieval origin stories which depicted Scandinavia as a place where invasive barbarian nations originated. This idea originated in the sixth century origin story of the Goths by Jordanes. He described Scandinavia as a "womb" or "workshop" where many barbarian nations originated (officina gentium aut certe velut vagina nationum). Jordanes, who was writing specifically about the Goths and other eastern European invaders who attacked on horseback, was influenced in this by Saint Ambrose, who claimed that "Gog" the ruler of "Magog" mentioned in the Book of Ezekiel represented "the Goths", and that the Bible predicted an invader from the north, who would come on horseback as a mighty army, and be defeated. Gog and Magog were also associated with islands because God would "send fire on Magog, and among them that dwell carelessly in the isles". For his description of the island of "Scandza" (as he called it) Jordanes himself cited the classical writer Ptolemy, although some of his information probably derived from the lost work of Cassiodorus, who he was summarizing.
- The direct inspiration for the idea of a Scandinavian origin story for Burgundians, was probably the Origo Gentis Langobardorum, a similar medieval origin story of the Lombards which was heavily influenced by Jordanes.

== Bornholm as "Burgund island" ==
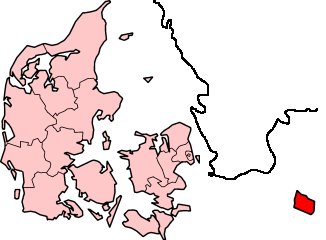
Location of the island of Bornholm as part of modern Denmark

Early medieval writers reported that the now Danish island of Bornholm in the Baltic Sea was called "Burgund land" or "Burgund island" – holm being a word for an island. In a 9th century description of Europe attached to his translation of Orosius, Alfred the Great called it Burgenda land in Old English. He was quoting Wulfstan of Hedeby, who reported that this was an island with its own king. He also quoted Ohthere of Hålogaland who mentioned Burgendan (plural), south of the Swedes (Sweon), and east of the Ostseæ – the Ostseæ being described as the "arm" of sea running north of the Danes, and south of the Swedes. Much later, Saxo Grammaticus called Bornholm Burgenda insula in Latin (insula also meaning island). Icelandic sources from the 13th century onward refer to the island as Borgundarhólmr, where Borgundar is a plural implying the existence of a people with this name.

Although it appears there was a medieval people living on Bornholm with a name effectively the same as shorter Latin form sometimes used to refer to the Burgundians, this name probably related to the island's name which meant "high island", referring to the geography of the island itself. Whether or not there is a connection to the continental Burgundii known to Rome is unknown. Scholars believe that a name coincidence is likely, because the shorter "Burgundii"-version of the name is based upon a descriptive placename which can be found in many places in Europe. A parallel Celtic tribal name is for example also known, the Brigantes in the highlands of northern England. On the other hand, it has been argued that this geographical placename is especially common in Scandinavia. In Norway, for example, there are small villages named Borgund such as Borgund in Lærdal Municipality, Borgund in Stad Municipality, and Borgund Church in Ålesund Municipality. An old proposal, now doubted by modern historians, is that the continental Burgundians known to the Romans must have migrated from Bornholm. A related proposal associated with older historiography is that these Burgundi of Bornholm had themselves migrated from Norway.

== See also ==
- Dauphiné
- List of kings of Burgundy
- Nibelung (later legends of the Burgundian kings)

== Sources ==
- Anton, Hans (1981), "Burgunden II. Historisches § 4-7", in Beck, Heinrich; Geuenich, Dieter; Steuer, Heiko (eds.), Reallexikon der Germanischen Altertumskunde, vol. 4 (2 ed.), De Gruyter, pp. 235–248, ISBN 978-3-11-006513-8
- Beck, Heinrich (1978), "Bornholm § 1. Namenkundliches", in Beck, Heinrich; Geuenich, Dieter; Steuer, Heiko (eds.), Reallexikon der Germanischen Altertumskunde, vol. 3 (2 ed.), De Gruyter, pp. 296–297, ISBN 978-3-11-006512-1
- Beck, Heinrich (1981), "Burgunden I. Philologisches § 1. Sprachquellen", in Beck, Heinrich; Geuenich, Dieter; Steuer, Heiko (eds.), Reallexikon der Germanischen Altertumskunde, vol. 4 (2 ed.), De Gruyter, pp. 224–230, ISBN 978-3-11-006513-8
- Christensen, Arne Søby (2002). Cassiodorus, Jordanes and the History of the Goths. Museum Tusculanum Press. ISBN 9788772897103.
- Domański, Grzegorz (1995), "Les Burgondes. Leur entrée dans l'histoire", in Gaillard de Sémainville, Henri (ed.), Les Burgondes, translated by Nurdin, Jean, ARTEHIS Éditions, doi:10.4000/books.artehis.17652
- Halsall, Guy (2007). Barbarian Migrations and the Roman West, 376–568. Cambridge and New York: Cambridge University Press. ISBN 978-0-52143-543-7. Archived from the original on 23 April 2023.
- Heather, Peter (1998), "Disappearing and Reappearing Tribes", Strategies of Distinction. The Construction of Ethnic Communities, 300-800, Transformation of the Roman World, vol. 2, Brill, doi:10.1163/9789004609518_006
- Leube, Achim (1995), "Contribution à l'histoire primitive, archéologique et culturelle du Brandebourg oriental pendant la période du Ier au Ve siècle après Jésus-Christ"", in Gaillard de Sémainville, Henri (ed.), Les Burgondes, translated by Nurdin, Jean, ARTEHIS Éditions, doi:10.4000/books.artehis.17661
- Liccardo, Salvatore (2023), Old Names, New Peoples: Listing Ethnonyms in Late Antiquity, Brill, doi:10.1163/9789004686601, ISBN 978-90-04-68660-1
- Neumann, Günther (1981), "Burgunden I. Philologisches § 2. Namenkundliches", in Beck, Heinrich; Geuenich, Dieter; Steuer, Heiko (eds.), Reallexikon der Germanischen Altertumskunde, vol. 4 (2 ed.), De Gruyter, pp. 230–231, ISBN 978-3-11-006513-8
- Maenchen-Helfen, Otto J. (1973). The World of the Huns: Studies in Their History and Culture. University of California Press. ISBN 9780520015968.
- Mathisen, Ralph W. (1979), "Resistance and Reconciliation: Majorian and the Gallic Aristocracy after the Fall of Avitus", Francia, 7: 597–628
- Nixon, C E V; Rodgers, Barbara Saylor (1994). In praise of later Roman emperors: the Panegyrici Latini. Berkeley: University of California Press. ISBN 0-520-08326-1.
- Schipp, Oliver (2012), "Die Burgunder links des Rheins 406–436/443", Berichte zur Archäologie in Rheinhessen und Umgebung, 5: 61–72
- Schönfeld (1911), "Burgundiones", Wörterbuch der altgermanischen personen- und völkernamen, pp. 55–58
- Steinacher, Roland (2020), "Rome and Its Created Northerners", in Friedrich, Matthias; Harland, James M. (eds.), Interrogating the 'Germanic', De Gruyter, pp. 31–66, doi:10.1515/9783110701623-003, ISBN 978-3-11-070162-3, S2CID 241474332
- Teichner, Félix (1995), "Nouveaux indices de la présence de peuples germaniques orientaux en 'Mainfranken'", in Gaillard de Sémainville, Henri (ed.), Les Burgondes, ARTEHIS Éditions, doi:10.4000/books.artehis.17670
- Wolfram, Herwig (1995), "Les Burgondes : faiblesse et pérennité (407/413-534)", in Gaillard de Sémainville, Henri (ed.), Les Burgondes, translated by Raviot, Jacques, ARTEHIS Éditions, doi:10.4000/books.artehis.17631
- Wolfram, Herwig (1997). The Roman Empire and Its Germanic Peoples. University of California Press. ISBN 978-0520085114. Archived from the original on 2023-04-23.
- Wood, Ian N. (1990), "Ethnicity and the Ethnogenesis of the Burgundians", in Wolfram, Herwig; Pohl, Walter (eds.), Typen der Ethnogenese unter besonderer Berücksichtigung der Bayern, vol. 1, Österreichische Akademie der Wissenschaften, pp. 53–69
- Wood, Ian N. (2003), "Gentes, Kings and Kingdoms—The Emergence of States: The Kingdom of the Gibichungs", Regna and Gentes, Brill, doi:10.1163/9789047404255_012
- Wood, Ian N. (2017), "Burgundian law-making, 451-534", Italian Review of Legal History, 3: 1–27, doi:10.13130/2464-8914/12878
- Wood, Ian N. (2021), "The Making of the 'Burgundian Kingdom", Reti Medievali Journal, 22 (2): 111–140, doi:10.6093/1593-2214/7721, ISSN 1593-2214
