= Belagines =

6th century Gothic legal text

The belagines were written laws which, according to Jordanes, were given to the Goths by Dicineus / Dekaineos, the Dacian-Getic legislator, Zalmoxian priest at the time of Burebista.

These belagines laws entered in the tradition of the Ostrogoths but it does not exclude similar Visigothic traditions, since the Dicineu / Dekaineos tradition no matter how literary it may be, points to Dacia.

== Name ==
Belagines (described by Jordanes as "compiled laws") is the transcription of the Gothic word *bi-lageineis "laws". The singular *bilageins is based on *bi-lagjan "lay down, impose".

== 6th century ==
The Origo Gothica (555 AD) contains the Gothic term belagines for the tribal law. But the author claimed that this law had been written down in the distant past

The only place in the antique literature that the word belagines occurs is Jordanes' Getica. Karl Müllenhoff suggested that either Jordanes or Cassiodorus got this information from Dio, and that it related to the Getae

== Fictional character ==
Danish scholar Arne Søby Christensen claims that the Getica was an entirely fabricated account, and that the origin of the Goths in the book is a construction based on popular Greek and Roman myths as well as a misinterpretation of recorded names from Northern Europe. The purpose of this fabrication, according to Christensen, was to establish a glorious identity for the peoples that had recently gained power in post-Roman Europe. Christensen the importance of the word belagines has been overstated, as it occurs in a fictitious context.

Canadian scholar Walter Goffart suggests another incentive: Getica was part of a conscious plan by emperor Justinian and the propaganda machine at his court. He wanted to affirm that Goths (and their barbarian cousins) did not belong to the Roman world, thus justifying the claims of the Eastern Roman Empire to the western part of the latter.

== Bibliography ==
- Eliade, Mircea (1970). De Zalmoxis à Gengis-Khan: études comparatives sur les religions et le folklore de la Dacie et de l'Europe orientale. Payot.
- Fol, Alexander (1996). History of Humanity: From Seventh Century B.C. to the Seventh Century A.D. Bernan Assoc. ISBN 92-3-102812-X.
- Goffart, Walter (1988). The Narrators of Barbarian History. Princeton.
- Iamblichus; Clark, Gillian (1998). On the Pythagorean Life. Liverpool University Press. ISBN 978-0-85323-326-8.
- Lehmann, Winfred Philipp; Hewitt, Helen-J.J.; Feist, Sigmund (1986). A Gothic Etymological Dictionary: Based on the Third Edition of Vergleichendes Worterbuch Der Gotischen Sprache by Sigmund Feist. Brill Academic Publishers. ISBN 978-90-04-08176-5.
- Mierow, Charles Christopher (1908). Jordanes: The Origin and deeds of the Goths in English Version. Princeton.
- Wells, Peter S. (2004). "Cassiodorus, Jordanes, and the History of the Goths: Studies in a Migration Myth (Book Review)". The Historian. 66 – via Questia.
- Wolfram, Herwig (1990). History of the Goths. University of California Press. ISBN 978-0-520-06983-1.
