= Origin of the Goths =

Scholarship about Goth origins

Concerning the origin of the Goths before the 3rd century CE, there is no consensus among scholars. In the 3rd century the Goths began to be mentioned by Roman writers as an increasingly important people living north of the lower Danube and Black Sea, in the area of modern Romania, Republic of Moldova, and Ukraine. The Goths at first allied with, but then increasingly replaced other peoples who had been dominant in the region, especially the Carpi, the Germanic-speaking Bastarnae, and the Sarmatians. While many scholars, such as Michael Kulikowski, believe there is insufficient evidence to come to strong conclusions about their earlier origins, there is also a long-standing proposal that the Goths must have derived their at least their name from the Gutones, who lived near the delta of the Vistula in what is now Poland in the 1st and 2nd centuries CE. Associated with that tradition, it is also often proposed that these Gutones were in turn culturally related to the similarly named Gutes of Gotland and the Geats of southern Scandinavia, who are both known from much later historical periods.

The Goths of late antiquity were seen by classical authors as one of a group closely related "Gothic peoples". Procopius (c. 500 - 565), for example, remarked that the Vandals and Gepids used the same Gothic language. Examples of this language have survived and it is classified by modern scholars as a Germanic language. However, classical writers did not call the Goths "Germanic", but rather categorized them as Scythians and Getae, linking them to their predecessors in the regions they lived in, whose customs they believed to have been similar. Modern scholars agree that the 3rd-century Goths can be seen as one dominant group within an ethnically diverse region, indistinguishable in their material culture from their neighbours north of the lower Danube and of the Black Sea.

Among the different types of evidence which are considered most relevant to tracing Gothic origins are their name, their written language, artistic and archaeological evidence of links between regions, and classical Greco-Roman ethnographic literature. The Germania of Tacitus, written c. 98 CE, has played an important role because it mentions the Gutones living in the area of present-day Poland. The only surviving Roman account of Gothic origins, the Getica of Jordanes, written c. 551 CE, continues to exert a strong influence.

Since the Second World War, most scholars, accepting parts of the "ethnogenesis" model associated with the Vienna school, have tended to emphasize that the name, language and traditions of Goths of the 3rd century need not imply any a single large-scale migration of, or similar ancestral connection to, the Gutones or other peoples with similar names. Nevertheless, some historians such as Peter Heather, while partly accepting this argument, have argued that there must have been a significant stream of movement from Poland towards Ukraine over a long period of time.

== Language and name of the Goths ==
Philologists and linguists generally believe that the name of the Goths is derived from a Germanic language, and can be analyzed as the same name as "Gutones", though the name of this earlier and more northern people had a different grammatical form. According to such proposals, the name is derived from an old Germanic verb meaning "to pour", reflected in modern English "gutter" (modern Dutch goot). Various proposals have been made about why the Goths would have been called "pourers".

Heather has argued that while this similar name on its own could arguably be an "accidental resemblance", there were also other ethnic names, the Vandals and Rugii, which seem to have moved in a similar way - found in what is now Poland in the 1st century, but found south of the Carpathians near the Goths in subsequent centuries. Another type of evidence strengthening the case for a connection to the north is the language which the Goths used.

The Gothic language, known from their bible translation and fragmentary evidence, is the only clearly attested member of what modern linguists designate as the East Germanic language family, because it was already distinct from the two Germanic families that have survived today, West Germanic and North Germanic, which were originally respectively spoken in the neighbouring regions of what is now northern Germany, and southern Scandinavia, both of which are relatively far from the homeland of the 3rd-century Goths. It is therefore generally believed that the language of the Goths had its origins to the northwest, implying a movement of people from the direction of Poland. Already in the first century, the Roman author Tacitus also mentioned similar to those found mainly in Germania being spoken east of the Carpathians and Vistula, among the group of peoples known as the Bastarnae or Peucini.

That the Baltic Gutones may also have spoken a Germanic language is also implied by Tacitus, in his Germania written around 98 AD. He described the "Gotones" or "Gothones" as a part of a group of similar Germanic peoples, which also included the neighboring Rugii and Lemovii, who both lived on the Baltic coast. He reported that this group had some distinct characteristics compared to other Germanic peoples. These three peoples armed themselves round shields and short swords, and he described them as "ruled by kings, a little more strictly than the other Germanic peoples" ceterae Germanorum gentes. Between the Gutones and the mountains to the south lived the Lugians.

On the other hand, the Germanic language of the Goths could have arrived in their region from sources other than the Gutones. Heather points out that Germanic language arrived earlier in the Black Sea region, because Tacitus reports that the Bastarnae living in the Gothic region already in first century, spoke a Germanic languages. The name and language of the Goths may have even had separate origins. Historian Herwig Wolfram argued that although the Gutones of the Lower Vistula brought an originally Scandinavian name to the Goths, the Gothic language known from later times developed on the continent under Vandal hegemony in what is now Poland.

Evidence that the Goths spoke the same language as the Vandals comes from the 6th century Procopius reported the Goths of his time spoke the same language as the Vandals and Gepids, who lived to their west, and who he described as the most important "Gothic peoples" (plural) apart from the Goths themselves. He writes that “there were many Gothic nations in earlier times just as there are now, but the greatest and most important of all are the Goths, Vandals, Visigoths, and Gepids. While the geographical origins of the Gepids are not described in classical ethnography, the Vandals in the first century were described by early Roman writers as inhabitants of the area between the Oder and Vistula in what is now Poland. Most notably, in about 77 AD, Pliny the Elder described the Gutones themselves as a member of the larger Germanic sub-group called the Vandili, who are generally believed to be precursors of the later Vandals.

== Archaeology ==
There is a scholarly consensus that the Goths described by the Romans starting in the 3rd century were one of the peoples within the Sântana de Mureș-Černjachov complex of material cultures, which covered a large area including modern Romania, Moldova, and Ukraine. While the Goths enjoyed several centuries of hegemony over this region, this culture continued to contain peoples of different ethnicities, speaking more than one language.

The Sântana de Mureș-Černjachov complex exhibits clear evidence of close connections to the archaeological cultures which surrounded it, including the Roman Balkans, the Wielbark culture near the mouth of the Vistula, and the Przeworsk culture in what is now inland Poland and eastern Slovakia. The Wielbark culture is commonly considered to have represented a group of peoples which included the Gutones, and the Vandals are considered to have been present within the Przeworsk culture. There is evidence that the development of the Sântana de Mureș-Černjachov complex was strongly connected to trade routes between the Roman empire to the south, and northern peoples such as the Gutones who supplied commodities such as furs and amber, which came from the Baltic coast.

Favouring a connection between the Wielbark and Sântana de Mureș-Černjachov cultures, archaeologists note that the Wielbark material culture spread southwards in the second century, overlapping with areas which had previously been more distinctly under the influence of the Przeworsk culture, until it reached the northern limits of the Sântana de Mureș-Černjachov culture. In the same period, archaeological evidence also shows signs that groups using Przeworsk materials moved south to the area inside the Carpathians, which is presumed to correspond to the arrival of some Vandal groups into that area, as mentioned by Roman authors.

While Wolfram suggested that the 3rd century Goths had both Przeworsk and Wielbark influences, Kulikowski has argued that it is not necessary to assume any influence from the Wielbark culture, and the Vistula Gutones. As an example of an alternative scenario he suggested that the Germanic-speaking Gothic elite came from the same group of archaeological cultures which contained the Vandals, the Przeworsk culture. In his opinion, even with the similar name, the Gutones would never have been proposed to be ancestors of the Goths if it were not for the strong influence in more recent times of the 6th-century writer Jordanes.

== The influence of Jordanes ==
Putting aside recent attempts to find other types of evidence to confirm his story, Jordanes is the original source of the idea that the Goths migrated from the Vistula to an area north of the Black Sea, and also of the idea that before then, their elite had migrated in two boats from Scandinavia under the leadership of a man named Berig, followed by one boat of Gepids. The name Jordanes uses for the "island" of Scandinavia was "Scandza", which can be found mentioned by earlier Roman geographers such as Pliny the Elder and Ptolemy. This account of Jordanes has been used to argue for an ancestral connection to the similarly named Gutes of Gotland and the Geats of southern Scandinavia.

Scholarly discussion about the reliability of Jordanes has focussed upon the questions of his sources, and his aims. Jordanes himself mentioned that he preferred written sources and he explicitly mentioned both older Roman ethnographical works, such as the ones which mentioned the Gutones living near the Vistula, and early works which interpreted passages in the Old Testament. Jordanes had read Josephus and apparently saw his account of the origins of the Scythians as descendants of the Biblical Magog in Genesis as compatible with his own account, though he questioned why Josephus had not specifically named the Goths and given more details. Also influencing Jordanes were the influential christian writers Ambrose (about 340–397), Orosius (about 375–420) and Jerome (about 347–420). Ambrose equated the Scythians and Goths with the Biblical Gog and Magog, barbarians who come from the extreme north, where there are islands. Orosius is among the earliest writers to equate the Goths with Scythians, listing them along with the Huns and Alans as the "Scythians" of his time.

Concerning migration from Scandinavia Peter Heather has argued that in contrast to Jordanes, whole nations clearly did not move from there to Poland, and at most "intrusive Gothic elite moving from Scandinavia – probably in many small, separate sub-groups – may have set in motion new socio-political processes in northern Poland". The account of Jordanes, involving a simple mass migration from Scandinavia "must be decisively rejected".

== Interpretations ==
Interpretations of the evidence vary. While a Scandinavian migration is now doubted, the idea of a migration from the Polish coast remains common among many scholars, while others such as Kulikowski now deny the necessity of assuming any single large migration of Germanic speakers into the Black Sea region. Heather for example argues that in order to explain the Germanic language of the Goths, there must at least have been a significant stream of people who moved over time into the Gothic homelands north of the Black Sea, including women and children. He also argues that there are archaeological indications of such movements. Heather accepts that "in theory" the third century appearance of the Goths could represent the re-emergence of Germanic-speaking groups such as the Bastarnae who had dominated the same region in the first century AD. However, he believes that it is "seriously unconvincing" for Kulikowsi to argue that the "explosion of groups called Goths into the Danubian fringes of the Roman world in the third century represented a rearrangement of the existing populations of the region rather than any kind of migration process", because "there is no evidence" these earlier Germanic speakers had "dominance" in the region, like the Goths.

In the vision of Heather than, Gothic migration must have involved at least some larger unmixed groups, in order to explain the military impact of the Goths.

It could perhaps be seen as a mixed invasion-hypothesis model, where the migrants came in a flow that built momentum over time rather than in a block, where much of the indigenous population remained in place, but where large and mixed groups of migrants asserted themselves vigorously as the new political masters of the landscape.

In contrast, Wolfram, who also believed that Goths were descended partly from Gutones, argued that the Gothic name and tradition may have originally applied to a relatively small group of people. He also didn't treat linguistic continuity between the early Gutones and fourth-century Gothic as self-evident, noting that such an interpretation presupposes the continued existence of a “Gutonic language stratum” in later Gothic.

That the Goths were a ruling group within a mixed region is widely accepted by modern historians. However, as part of his argumentation that they originated with the migration of large unmixed groups, Heather also proposed that the Goths continued to be a relatively exclusive group who avoided accepting newcomers into their ranks, or intermarriage:

It is extremely important, moreover, not to forget the general historical context. The Goths and other third-century Germanic immigrants into the Black Sea region won their place by right of conquest, and had come to enjoy the riches of the frontier zone. Given that background, it is unlikely that differences in identity between themselves and those they subdued would have broken down quickly, even if there weren't the same differences in physical characteristics that helped keep Boers and their new neighbours apart in an analogous situation after the Great Trek.

On the other hand, Heather accepted that the need for "military manpower" implied some acceptance of "indigenous groups", who he believed would be accepted as a "lower-grade fighter" class as freemen or freedmen, who had a higher status than slaves, but a lower status than Goths. One distinct aspect of this reasoning which has been compared to the approach of scholars in the 19th and early 20th century, is that Heather assumes that the Goths saw themselves not only as immigrants, but also as specifically Germanic, and understood other Germanic-speaking peoples to be relatives with shared aims. He writes for example that "the hegemony of the Germanic-speakers east of the Carpathians, lost in the overthrow of the Bastarnae and their allies, was restored by the migration of Goths, Rugi, Heruli, and other Germanic-speaking groups in the third century".

Scholars such as Halsall and Kulikowski have been critical of Heather's use of the vision of Germanic-speaking peoples. Kulikowski, for example, has written as follows:

[Heather] is right to try to deduce governing apparatus from the actions that kings and chieftains were able to compel their followers to take. This approach, more than anything, goes some way toward justifying his assertion that a broad class of nonaristocratic "freemen" warriors must have existed in many of the barbarian cultures of the first half of the millennium. Yet to claim the point proved and build further hypotheses upon it is not legitimate; he comes perilously close to recreating the old, volkisch notion of an inherent “Germanic” belief in freedom. Throughout, in fact, Heather makes the tacit assumption that evidence from any “Germanic,” “Celtic,” or “Slavic” group can be used to analyze any other “Germanic,” “Celtic,” or “Slavic” group—in other words, that linguistic identity and socioinstitutional behaviors go inevitably together. [...] a great many historical comparanda would support a model that he ignores — that the Goths were formed from a large number of indigenes and a small number of migrants under the pressure of Roman imperialism, and in the shadow of the Empire.

While Heather envisages that a Germanic elite of the early Goths avoided inter-marriage with other groups, excluding newcomers, other historians have envisaged quite different dynamics. Herwig Wolfram, for example, proposed that the strength of the Goths lay in their supposedly un-Germanic acceptance of kingship, which was specifically mentioned by Tacitus in the first century, as being true of the Gutones. According to this argumentation, kings with personal authority could decide questions of tribal membership quickly, and against tradition, making Gothic ethnicity attractive for warriors from other groups, and allowing the Goths to quickly gain in size and power.

Heather's vision of small groups of early Gutones building-up military control of points along north-south a trade route has on the other hand been influential even among scholars critical of his argumentation for a largescale migration. For example, while critical of Heather's proposals, Guy Halsall envisions a similar origins scenario:

It seems most likely that in the confusion of the third century and, specifically, the Roman abandonment of the Carpathian basin a Germanic-speaking military elite was able to spread its power down the amber routes into the lands of the Sarmatians, Dacians, and Carpi and found a number of kingdoms, some grouped into a powerful confederacy.

== Bibliography ==
- Andersson, Thorsten (1998). "Goten: § 1. Namenkundliches". In Beck, Heinrich [in German]; Steuer, Heiko [in German]; Timpe, Dieter [in German] (eds.). Reallexikon der Germanischen Altertumskunde (in German). Vol. 12. De Gruyter. pp. 402–403. ISBN 3-11-016227-X.
- Christensen, Arne Søby (2002). Cassiodorus, Jordanes and the History of the Goths. Museum Tusculanum Press. ISBN 9788772897103.
- Halsall, Guy (2007). Barbarian Migrations and the Roman West, 376–568. Cambridge and New York: Cambridge University Press. ISBN 978-0-52143-543-7.
- Heather, Peter (1994). Goths and Romans 332–489. Oxford Scholarship Online. doi:10.1093/acprof:oso/9780198205357.001.0001. ISBN 9780198205357.
- Heather, Peter (2010). Empires and Barbarians: The Fall of Rome and the Birth of Europe. Oxford University Press. ISBN 9780199892266.
- Heather, Peter (2023), "Scandza – 'The womb of nations'. Jordanes, Scandinavia & the history of the Goths", in Skre, Dagfinn; Hedlund Stylegar, Frans-Arne (eds.), Herre og drott – konge og sjøkonge, Cappelen Damm Forskning, pp. 17–34, JSTOR jj.36233714.5
- Kulikowski, Michael (2002), "Nation versus army: a necessary contrast?", in Gillett (ed.), On Barbarian Identity: Critical Approaches to Ethnicity in the Early Middle Ages
- Kulikowski, Michael (2006). Rome's Gothic Wars: From the Third Century to Alaric. Cambridge University Press. ISBN 978-1139458092.
- Kulikowski, Michael (August 8, 2011). "Peter Heather, Empires and Barbarians". Journal of Interdisciplinary History. 42 (2). MIT Press: 277–279. doi:10.1162/JINH_r_00217. JSTOR 41291195.
- Rübekeil, Ludwig (2002). "Scandinavia In The Light of Ancient Tradition". In Bandle, Oskar (ed.). The Nordic Languages. Vol. 1. Walter de Gruyter. pp. 593–604. ISBN 9783110148763.
- Steinacher, Roland (2020), "Hintergründe und Herkommen der Barbaren am Schwarzen Meer im 3. Jahrhundert n. Chr.", Empire in Crisis: Gothic Invasions and Roman Historiography, Holzhausen, hdl:20.500.12657/37435, ISBN 9783903207387
- Wolfram, Herwig (1988) [Originally published in German, 1980]. History of the Goths. Translated by Dunlap, Thomas J. University of California Press. ISBN 978-0-520-05259-8.
