= Origo gentis =

Medieval origin stories of groups of peoples

In medieval studies, an origo gentis is the origin story of a gens (people). It is not a literary genre of its own, but it is a part of quite extensive works that describe, for example, the history of the respective people. They can also be part of hero epics or biographies.

== Content of origines gentium ==
There are numerous mostly fictional and often universal elements (topoi) mixed in the origo gentis. At the center of the story is the origin myth of the respective group of people (such as the Goths, Lombards, Anglo-Saxons, Franks and Croats). It was usually handed down orally at the beginning and was recorded later and enriched with some elements from ancient scholars. In addition to a mythical explanation of a gens' origin, special moral and character traits that were "typical" for that group of people were usually cited. Often Scandinavia was given as the origin place, since this offered the opportunity to construct genealogies that were not verifiable. An ancient family tree (like the probably fictional Amal dynasty) could provide additional legitimacy to the ruling elite.

"Migration legends" often played an important role in an origo: a group of people emigrated and eventually reached another country, and got it, mostly by force. Although there is sometimes a historical core (such as the Anglo-Saxon migration to Britain), others seem to contain mostly fictional stories. This applies, for example, to an alleged "Trojan descent" or to the Scandinavian origin of Goths, which is now challenged due to lack of archaeological evidence. The description of the origin of the Goths in the Getica of Jordanes (which was based on the lost "Gothic history" of Cassiodorus) is today usually understood as a topical ethnographic narrative, which incorporated numerous fictional elements. A fairly common motif of an origo was also the so-called "primordial act". It was a central event of the gens' history, such as a significant victory, the crossing of a body of water, a kingdom of divine origin that is said to have existed since primeval times, and others. The main idea was to create an identity or establish a "new order", which has since had to be applied among the gens.

== Historical function of origines gentium ==
An origo could serve as an important connecting element within a gens that helped to hold together the otherwise ethnically heterogeneous associations, or only have an impact on identity. In this way, these poly-ethnic associations were linked into an ideal unity through the history of origin; this played an important role in the complex process of Late Antique and Early Medieval ethnogenesis. Well-known examples of origo are the Getica of Jordanes (which gave the Goths a history comparable to that of many other ancient peoples) or the Origo Gentis Langobardorum of the Langobards in the 7th century. The Franks adopted the Troy mythos popularized by the Romans through Virgil's Aeneid. According to the church historian Bede, the Saxons were called to Britain by King Vortigern and landed there with three ships under the command of brothers Hengist and Horsa.

Herwig Wolfram and his student Walter Pohl, authors of important works on this topic, both emphasize that modern ideas of "ethnicity' are in no way applicable to antique and medieval people. However, the conclusions based on this thesis are controversial. For example, Walter Goffart is very critical of the notion that there are similarities in works that deal with the stories of origin, rather each author with his image pursued his own goals.

== Sources ==
- Goffart, Walter A. (1988). The Narrators of Barbarian History (A.D. 550–800): Jordanes, Gregory of Tours, Bede, and Paul the Deacon. Princeton: Princeton University Press.
- Plassmann, Alheydis (2006). Origo gentis. Identitäts- und Legitimitätsstiftung in früh- und hochmittelalterlichen Herkunftserzählungen (in German). Berlin: Akademie Verlag. ISBN 3050042605.

== See also ==
- Origin stories of the Goths
- Anglo-Saxon settlement of Britain
