= War of Vesosis and Tanausis =

The War of Vesosis and Tanausis is described in Jordanes' Getica, a controversial account of the Goths as happening in remote antiquity when Vesosis, king of the Egyptians, made war against them. Their king at that time was Tanausis.

In a battle at the river Phasis in Colchis (modern Georgia), Tanausis, king of the Goths, met Vesosis, king of the Egyptians, and there inflicted a severe defeat upon him, pursuing him even to Egypt.

According to Arne Søby Christensen Jordanes assumed that the Scythians were the Goths and the women of the Goths Amazons. The war seems to be a retelling of an alleged war between the Scythians and Egyptians told by Orosius with Jordanes recasting a Scythian king as a king of the Goths.

The War of Vesosis and Tanausis is a combination of transcription errors and fantasy.

== See also ==
- Sesostris
