= Origin stories of the Goths =

Ancient accounts of Goth origins

There were several origin stories of the Goths recorded by Latin and Greek authors in late antiquity (roughly 3rd–8th centuries AD), and these are relevant not only to the study of literature, but also to attempts to reconstruct the early history of the Goths, and other peoples related to the Goths. From the perspective of Latin and Greek scholars, the Goths appeared under that name in the region north of the Black Sea and Lower Danube in the third century AD, but even the name of the Goths was not necessarily seen as new, because many such authors saw it as a new form of the name of the Getae who had long lived on the Lower Danube, or a new name for a part of the Scythian peoples who had long lived to their east, north of the Black sea. In the sixth century, Isidore of Seville also accepted this approach.

The earliest surviving written accounts of Gothic origins in the 5th century were by early Christian authors who continued to see the Goths as descendants of the Getae or Scythians, but they also attempted to fit them into biblical understandings of history. In the 6th century Jordanes drew upon these, but went further, giving a chronologically impossible account, which also drew upon older Roman historiography, and apparently Gothic accounts which no longer exist. His account was influential in the Middle Ages, and has often guided modern scholars in their own attempts to understand Gothic origins. In recent generations the strong influence of Jordanes upon the assumptions of scholars has become a topic of controversy.

Jordanes specifically linked the earliest Gothic origins, and therefore also in his account Getic and Dacia origins, to Scandinavia (the "island" of Scandza), and the Vistula estuary. Classical authors who Jordanes specifically cited, had reported the existence of the similarly named Gauts, and Gutones in those places, but his narrative may also have been influenced by lost accounts from the Goths themselves, or from others who were speculating on this topic in the 6th century. Many modern scholars have long seen this migration as a believable explanation of the Gothic name and their Germanic language. Jordanes' Getica has been categorized among the most important examples of the origo gentis (origin of a people) genre of literature as understood for example by historian Herwig Wolfram, but whether this category should be described as a genre has been questioned, for example by Walter Goffart, because of doubts that the authors understood themselves to be following a shared traditional model.

A quite different 6th century account was given by Procopius, who didn't emphasize the possible connection to the Danubian Getae, but instead specified their Scythian ancestry among the Sarmatians and Melanchlaeni who had lived on the eastern edge of the Greek world for centuries, originally near the River Don and Sea of Azov. He considered the Goths, Vandals and Gepids to be one people, only given different names because of their political history, and he saw the Sarmatians and Melanchlaeni as the same people. Like all classical writers including Jordanes he never referred to them as "Germanic peoples" (Germani), which in his account was the old name of the Franks of his time.

== Goths as Scythians, Getae and descendants of Magog ==
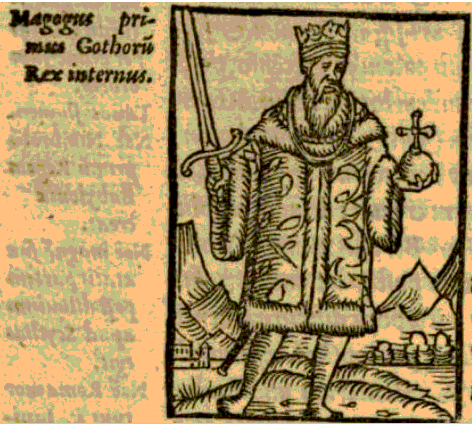
Illustration of Magog as the first king of Sweden, from Johannes Magnus' Historia de omnibus Gothorum Sueonumque regibus, 1554 ed.

The Goths are first noted as living north of the Roman empire's frontier on the Lower Danube in an area which had previously been home to Getae, Carpi, Bastarni and Sarmatians. Much earlier the regions east of the Getae were inhabited by the Scythians, and the term "Scythian" was still used in classical times to refer to inhabitants of the area. All of the surviving Gothic origins stories included elements which connected the Goths to at least some of these previous inhabitants of "Scythia". Already in the first half of the third century, Dexippos, whose history has only survived in fragments, referred to the Goths of his time as Scythians, although from the surviving fragments he did not necessarily intend to assert that all Scythians had the same origins.

The first surviving rationales for equating Goths with Scythians or Getae were by early Christian scholars, Ambrose (about 340–397), Orosius (about 375–420) and Jerome (about 347–420). Ambrose equated the Scythians and Goths with the Biblical Gog and Magog — barbarians who come from the extreme north, where there are islands. Ambrose, in his De Fide II.xvi explains that "Gog" the ruler of "Magog" mentioned in the Book of Ezekiel represented "the Goths" (hoc est Gothis). Gog was the subject of a prophecy in the Bible of an invader from the north, who will come on horseback as a mighty army, and be defeated. Gog and Magog were also associated with islands because God would "send fire on Magog, and among them that dwell carelessly in the isles".

According to Arne S. Christensen, one precursor of Ambrose's equation of the Goths with the Biblical Gog and Magog was Josephus (died about 100), who equated the Scythians with the descendants of biblical Magog, who he understood as a person, not a country. This was based upon a passage in the Book of Genesis. A connection between this ancestral Genesis Magog, and the prophesied Gog from Ezekiel, who ruled a country named Magog, or "Gog and Magog" from the similar 1st century AD Book of Revelation prophecy, was made explicit in Jerome. This paved the way for other writers to connect specifically to the Goths, as Scythians, to the biblical account of the ancestry of the Scythians as interpreted by Josephus, although Jerome himself did not do this.

Orosius is among early writers to equate the Goths with Scythians, listing them along with the Huns and Alans as the "Scythians" of his time. Jerome, like his contemporary Orosius, equated the Goths to the earlier Getae, but did not equate them to Gog and Magog, only stating that scholars before him and Orosius had made this equation. Saint Jerome however specifically rejected this equation of the Goths with Gog and Magog. (Nevertheless, Herwig Wolfram believes that with this assertion "he probably invented the identification of the Goths as Getae".) Their contemporary, Saint Augustine, argued that Gog and Magog should not be read as Ambrose had, as Goths, but seen as representing peoples all over the world, not any single specific barbarian people.

Another late 4th century writer who routinely called the Goths "Getae" was the poet Claudian (died about 404).

Much later, Isidore of Seville (died 636), in his own History of the Goths, suggested that the connection of the Goths to Magog in Ezekiel must have been assumed by previous authors because of the similarity in sound between "Gog" and "Goth". Similarly, he noted that the word for the Scythians (Skuthoi in transliterated Greek), was itself also similar to the name of the Goths (Guthoi). Isidore did not see these similarities of names as false leads, believing that these indicated the true origins of the Goths.

== Procopius ==
Procopius placed the Goths in the category called "Gothic nations" or "Gothic peoples" (Ancient Greek: Γοτθικὰ ἔθνη). Procopius also seems to have deliberately avoided using the term "Scythian" for the Goths, which he saw as a more general term used for all the nations of the region north of the Black Sea, including newcomers like the Huns and Cimmerians. Instead, according to Procopius, the ancient Gothic peoples were called Sauromatae and Melanchlaeni. Procopius therefore believed there was a continuity between the Gothic peoples of his times, and predecessors who originally lived in the eastern part of their range near the River Don in what is now Russia. While registering the fact that some authors called these Gothic peoples "Getic peoples", which would connect them instead to the ancient Getae of the Lower Danube in the western part of the Gothic range, he didn't follow that approach in his own writing.

According to Procopius, the names changed over time, but the Gothic peoples were distinguished from one another by nothing else at all because "they all have white bodies and fair hair, and are tall and handsome to look upon, and they use the same laws and practise a common religion". More specifically, the Gothic peoples of his time, the 6th century, were all of the Arian faith, and had one language called Gothic, and it seemed to him that "they all came originally from one tribe, and were distinguished later by the names of those who led each group". According to him, the most important Gothic peoples in his own time were the Goths (ruling Italy), the Vandals, Visigoths, and Gepids. Also designated as Gothic peoples by Procopius were the Sciri and Alans and some other peoples who came to dominate the western Roman military before Odoacer took control in the 5th century. Furthermore, he described the Rugii of his time as a Gothic people who had joined the Goths of Theoderic the Great when they in turn entered Italy, but they maintained some independence. Procopius also noted an isolated Gothic people called the Tetraxitae, who lived on the western shores of the Sea of Azov. They became isolated in the 5th century when the Visigoths and Vandals, who he believed to have also originated in the "Scythian" area, had already moved away and conquered Libya and Spain. The Tetraxitae were still there in the 6th century. (They were not Arians, but rather orthodox Christians, and so he wondered whether they had converted, though he admitted to not being able to give an answer.)

About 1000 years earlier, the early Greek historian Herodotus had already written about the Getae on the Lower Danube, as well as the Melanchlaeni and Sarmatae near the Don. He specifically described the Melanchlaeni, whose name means "black cloaks", as a non-Scythian people, who practiced the customs of the Scythians. They lived north of the "Royal Scythians" of his time, who lived between the Gerrhus river (Molochna), the Don, and Sea of Azov. The Sauromatae of Herodotus were the early Sarmatians, living in his period to the east of the Royal Scythians, on the eastern side of the Don. According to him they spoke a barbarous form of the Scythian language. The Sarmatians were a large group of peoples, and several of the Sarmatian peoples such as the Roxolani and Iazyges later moved westwards, becoming the "Scythian" neighbours of the Romans and Getae on the Lower Danube.

According to modern scholars, other evidence confirms that both the Sarmatian Alans and the Goths themselves lived near the Don and the Sea of Azov until the late 4th century and the arrival of the Huns, after which large numbers moved westwards into the Roman empire. However, it is not correct that the Vandals were among these peoples. Older Roman records clearly show that the Hasdingi Vandals who led the invasion of Northern Africa in the 5th century AD were already established near the Roman frontier in what is now Hungary during the Marcomannic Wars in the late second century, before the Goths and Alans arrived there, and they apparently arrived from the north, not the east. The Silingi Vandals who travelled with them to Gaul, Spain and Africa were apparently located near the Elbe in the second century, as reported by the geographer Ptolemy. Of the "Gothic peoples" who invaded Africa, only the Alans came from a region near the Sea of Azov.

== Jordanes ==
In the time of Jordanes, the Goths lived mainly in or near the Roman empire itself, but his account described thousands of years of dramatic mass migrations and military conquests, and several ancestral homelands and name changes.

Jordanes' Getica followed the tradition of simply equating the Goths to the classical Getae. However, he also followed the traditions that had them descended from the Scythians further east, and he also accepted the idea from Bible commentaries that the ultimate origins of the Goths lay in the islands of the far north. For his equation of the Getae and the Goths, even in the title of his work, he explicitly cited the authority of Orosius. Jordanes had also read Josephus, and apparently saw his account of the origins of the Scythians as descendants of the Biblical Magog in Genesis as compatible with his own account, though he questioned why Josephus had not specifically named the Goths, and discussed their beginnings.

Differently to other Gothic origins stories however, Jordanes named at least two specific northern places where the ancestors of the Goths had lived more than a thousand years earlier, the island of Scandza and the southern Baltic coast near the mouth of the Vistula. For his geographical information he cited Latin and Greek authors, but scholars are uncertain about the precise origins of the various details of Jordanes' migration stories. There is debate about whether he used real Gothic legends or simply synthesized older Latin and Greek works. Jordanes himself, in the prefaces to his Romana and Getica, mentions that his project of writing the Getica involved first reading the now lost, and much larger (12 volume) history of the Goths written by Cassiodorus, in Italy, who worked for the Ostrogothic regime. Indeed, in any opening section he noted that he had been asked by a friend to abridge it, and he had access to it for three days.

=== Scandza ===
The opening sections of the Getica form a long digression about the large northern island in the Baltic Sea known as "Scandza" to Jordanes. He is understood by modern scholars to have intended the peninsula of Scandinavia. According to Jordanes (IV 25, XVII 94), the Goths led by a king named Berig left this island in two boats, along with one boat of Gepids that followed them, 2030 years before 540, or 1490 BCE. This date is considered unrealistic by modern scholars.

Jordanes, apparently influenced by the earlier Bible-based stories of Scythian origins, created an influential narrative in this section whereby Scandza was a "womb of nations", claiming that many nations had spread from there in large numbers. He also gives a remarkable list of peoples who he believed lived in Scandza during his own time. It has been suggested that he (like his contemporary Procopius, and the slightly earlier Cassiodorus) had an interest in collecting information about the northern regions.

The name "Scandza" can be found in earlier Greek geographers such as Pliny the Elder and Ptolemy, and Jordanes explicitly mentions having used such sources. This raises the possibility that Jordanes used a name from his reading of Roman and Greek authors, in order to add detail to an older idea of a northern origin for the Scythians.

=== Vistula region ===
After Scandza, Jordanes says the Goths lived in an area near the Vistula river, settling at a place called Gothiscandza in his time. The Gepids, who travelled behind them in another ship, settled on an island in the Vistula previously called Spesis, and later called Gepedoius (XVII 96). According to Jordanes, the Goths lived there for the reigns of about 5 kings, starting in about 1490 BC — a period long before the Roman empire existed. According to Jordanes, the Goths then moved to take over another coastal region where the Ulmerugi lived. Modern historians have suggested that this name may refer to the Rugii, who had been reported by the Roman author Tacitus as living in this area about 100 AD. Jordanes appears to have also made use of contemporary sources familiar with northern geography. For example, he says that Gothiscandza still has the same name (IV 25), and the Gepid island of Spesis was in his own time inhabited by the otherwise unknown Vividarii, who he described as a mix of different peoples (XVII 96).

One of the neighbours of these Rugii who Tacitus mentions were the Gutones, whose name is widely believed to be related to the Goth's own name, in their own language. Ptolemy also mentioned these Gutones and placed them close to the Vistula. This raises the question among some scholars as to whether Jordanes (or a source of his) had developed this part of the narrative based on a study of old Roman works. In the case of the Gutones mentioned by Pliny the Elder, Tacitus and Ptolemy, Jordanes may well have been adapting the works of older authors, though using an unbelievable chronology. However, many historians believe that there was a real connection between the Gutones and the Goths. Not only the name, but also archaeological evidence favours the idea. In particular, there are similarities between the Vistula Wielbark culture, which is believed to have included the Gutones, and the Ukrainian Chernyakhov culture, which is believed to have included the Gothic peoples ancestral to those known to Jordanes and his contemporaries.

Among scholars who accept a connection between the Vistula Gutones and the Scythia Goths, there are a wide range of opinions about the details. In particular, there are doubts about whether a large number of people moved, and if so, whether they stayed together as one continuous ethnic group.

=== Scythia and the Lower Danube ===
Prior to their entanglements with Rome, Jordanes (V 38) describes the Goths as having moved around between different parts of Scythia and Dacia, all north of the Danube and Black Sea. In these periods Jordanes equates the Goths to peoples with other names, involved in stories set many centuries before the Goths appeared. This is considered chronologically impossible and factually incorrect by modern scholars, although some scholars have argued that specific parts of it may reflect something from real Gothic history as opposed to Dacian, Getic or early Scythian history.

- The first, Oium, was a fertile area of Scythia where the Goths fought and defeated the previous inhabitants of that area, the Spali (a people apparently mentioned by Pliny the Elder as living on or near the Don river). Jordanes believed that the Goths had first arrived with an army and families in one specific fertile part of Scythia, as one people. Specifically, Jordanes says that "Oium" was their name for Scythia, or this fertile part of it.
- Second, after defeating the Spali, the Goths hastened to their new homeland in Scythia near the Sea of Azov ("Lake Maeotis"). Jordanes mentions that this part of his narrative agrees with the work of a lost chronicler of the Goths called Ablabius, and (in a well-known comment) "the ancient Gothic songs, which are almost historical in nature". Jordanes (V) describes this region as being a bend of Sea of Azov, between the rivers Dniepr and Don. During their long stay here, these Scythian Goths supposedly battled against Egyptian and Middle Eastern empires. Having created the Median empire, some Goths became the ancestors of the Parthians (V-VI). Some of the Gothic women, when carried away, became the Amazons, and held the kingdoms of Asia for almost a year before returning to the Goths (VII).
- Third, for a very long period they lived in Moesia, Thrace and Dacia, areas found near the Lower Danube and Balkans, and bordering the Graeco-Roman world. In this period, Jordanes equates the Goths with historical Dacians and Getae, who had been reported by historians writing long before the time of Jordanes. He reports for example (IX) that in the time of the Trojan War, the Goths (as Getae) ruled a kingdom at Moesia. The 5th century BC Thracian king Sitalces is also described as a Gothic king (X 66). Jordanes also emphasizes (V.39) several important kings who made the Goths wiser: Zeuta, Dicineus, and Zalmoxis. Zalmoxis had been reported as a Getic deity by Herodotus already in the 5th century BC, and in the first century Strabo claimed that Zalmoxis had been a Dacian slave of Pythagoras. Strabo also mentioned Decaeneus as a much later disciple living in the time of the Dacian king Burebista. Jordanes represents these Dacians as Goths, in an impossible chronology. Jordanes even specified that the Gothic order of "capillati" or long-haired men, was instituted by this Dicineus, and that the laws he made for the Goths were still in existence in his time.
- Finally, Jordanes says the Goths moved back east to the region north of the Black Sea ("Pontus"), where Roman and Greek sources report the Goths themselves more clearly in the 3rd and 4th centuries.

== Bibliography ==
- Christensen, Arne Søby (2002). Cassiodorus, Jordanes and the History of the Goths. Museum Tusculanum Press. ISBN 9788772897103.
- Ford, Randolph B (2020), Rome, China, and the Barbarians: Ethnographic Traditions and the Transformation of Empires, Cambridge University Press, ISBN 9781108596602
- Goffart, Walter (2006). Barbarian Tides: The Migration Age and the Later Roman Empire. Philadelphia: University of Pennsylvania Press. ISBN 978-0-8122-3939-3.
- Jordanes (1882), Mommsen (ed.), Getica, Monumenta Germaniae Historica, Scriptores, Auctores antiquissimi 5 (in Latin)
- Wolfram, Herwig (1988). History of the Goths. Berkeley and Los Angeles: University of California Press. ISBN 0-520-05259-5.
