= Romana (Jordanes) =

The Romana is a Latin book written by Jordanes in the 6th century, being a short compendium of the most remarkable events from the creation down to the victory obtained by Narses, in AD 552, over king Teia. The work has been published under many different titles: De Regnorum ac Temporum Successione, Liber de origine mundi et actibus Romanorum ceterarumque gentium or De gestis Romanorum.

It is an epitome of epitomes that was begun before, but published after, the Getica, covering the history of the world from the Creation, mainly based on Jerome, with material from Florus, and for the last part from Marcellinus Comes, the continuator of Jerome; it is of some value for the century 450–550, when Jordanes is dealing with recent history, and also for some accounts of several barbarous nations of the north, and the countries which they inhabited. It was written in 551 or 552 at Constantinople for a man addressed as "nobilissime frater Vigilii", unlikely to be Pope Vigilius.

Its Editio princeps, with the Getica and the Historia Langobardorum of Paul the Deacon, was printed in Augsburg by Konrad Peutinger in 1515. The earliest translations are a French translation by Drouet de Maupertuy, and one in Swedish by J. T. Peringskiold in 1719. The classical edition remains that by Theodor Mommsen in 1882, published with the Getica in the Monumenta Germaniae Historica. It was Mommsen who first gave Jordanes' works the names by which they are mostly known, Romana and Getica.
