= Borgund =

Borgund may refer to the following places in Norway:

== Møre og Romsdal county ==
- Borgund Municipality (Møre og Romsdal), a former municipality in Sunnmøre
- Borgund Church, a church in Ålesund Municipality

== Vestland county ==
- Borgund, Lærdal, a village in Lærdal Municipality
- Borgund Municipality (Sogn og Fjordane), a former municipality now part of Lærdal Municipality
- Borgund Stave Church, a stave church in Lærdal Municipality
- Borgund Tunnel, a tunnel in Lærdal Municipality
- Borgund (also known as Borgundvåg), a village in Stad Municipality
