= Gutones =

First century Germanic people near the Vistula

The Gutones (also spelled Guthones, Gotones etc) were a Germanic people who were reported by Roman era writers in the 1st and 2nd centuries to have lived in what is now Poland. The most specific description of their location, by the geographer Ptolemy, placed them east of the Vistula River.

The Gutones are of particular interest to historians, philologists and archaeologists studying the origins of the Goths and other related Germanic-speaking people, who lived north of the Black Sea and Lower Danube, and first appear in Roman records in that region in the 3rd century. The name of the Gutones is believed to be a representation of the Goths' own name in their own language, and the archaeological remnants of these two groups of peoples, generally equated to the Wielbark culture and Chernyakhov culture respectively, show signs of significant contact.

== Possible attestations ==
The Roman Empire under Hadrian, showing the location of the Gothones, then inhabiting the east bank of the Vistula

There are only a small number of definite mentions of the Gutones in classical sources, as well as several other possible ones. The clear ones are as follows:

- In AD 18 the Gotones assisted Catualda, a young Marcomannic exile, who was thus able to overthrow the rule of Maroboduus. This is mentioned in the Annals of Tacitus. Historian Herwig Wolfram has suggested that the Gutones were clients of the Lugii and Vandals in the 1st century AD, and that prior to this, both the Gutones and Vandals had themselves been subjects of the Marcomanni.
- In AD 77, Pliny the Elder mentioned the Gutones as one of the Germanic peoples of Germania, and, along with the Burgundiones, Varini and Carini a member of the larger group called the Vandili, apparently the early Vandals. Pliny classifies the Vandili as one of the five principal "Germanic races" (germanorum genera), along with the Ingvaeones, Istvaeones, Irminones and Peucini. The Vandals of this period apparently lived in what is now eastern Germany and Poland, between the Elbe and Vistula rivers.
- In another work by Tacitus, the Germania from around AD 98, the Gotones or Gothones were described as a part of a group of similar Germanic peoples together with the neighboring Rugii and Lemovii. The Lemovii and Rugii lived on the coast of the Baltic Sea, and the Gotones lived to their south, north of the Lugii. He reported that these three peoples had some distinct characteristics compared to other Germanic peoples. For one thing they carried round shields and short swords, and for another they were "ruled by kings, a little more strictly than the other German tribes".
- In his work Geography from around AD 150, Ptolemy mentions the Gutones or Gythones as living east of the Vistula, and thus, according to his geographical definitions, not in Germania, but in "Sarmatia", between the Veneti and the Fenni, both of whom Tacitus had discussed separately from the Gotones.

Less certainly:

- Pliny the Elder wrote that in the 4th century BC, the traveler Pytheas reported a northern people called the Guiones, who lived on a very large bay called Metuonis and bought amber from the Isle of Abalus, one day's sail away. Some scholars have equated these "Guiones" with the Gutones. However, other proposals for amendment of this name include Inguiones, or Teutones, both of whom are mentioned by Pliny in this same region.
- Around AD 15, Strabo mentioned the "Butones" (Greek: Βούτωνας), Lugii, and Semnones and others as making up a large group of peoples who came under the domination of the Marcomannic king Maroboduus. Because the Butones are only mentioned once, and the Gutones were mentioned by Tacitus in connection with Maroboduus and the Lugii, they are often equated with the Gutones, and the "B" is assumed to be an error.

The Lugii, whom Tacitus described as neighbours of the Gutones in his Germania, have been considered by authors such as Wolfram to be the same people as the Vandals. Both the Lugii and Vandals are associated with the Przeworsk culture, which was located to the south of the Wielbark culture. Tacitus does not discuss the Vandals, except for a single passing reference to the existence of the term.

== Comparison to Jordanes' Getica ==
The 1st and 2nd century Gutones are often compared to the 6th century history of the Goths written by Jordanes, referred to today as Getica. Some parts of it are considered unreliable. For example it claimed to extend back to 1490 BC. On the other hand, its claim that the Goths had come from the Vistula is taken seriously by many historians including Peter Heather and Herwig Wolfram, given the similarity of the name Gutones mentioned in first century literature to the name of the Goths. Heather has argued that the name similarity is harder to dismiss as an "accidental resemblance", when it is considered that the names of at least two other 1st-century Germanic peoples from the Polish region, the Vandals and the Rugii, are also found south of the Carpathians by the 3rd century.

Historians do not agree upon how much of the narrative of Jordanes was derived from his reading of classical sources such as Ptolemy, and how much came from Gothic traditions, and other sources which could have helped him confirm details. In Getica (IV 25 and XVII) Jordanes gave the following account about the Gothic time in an area near the Vistula, more than 1000 years before Christ. The timing of this period, supposedly lasting about 5 generations and starting in 1490 BC, is not accepted by historians. Historians do debate other aspects of the account:

- He described the Vistula Goths as having lived near the ancestors of the Gepids, who were relatives of the Goths, and lived on an island in the Vistula called Spesis. According to Jordanes, these two related groups had common origins in Scandza (Scandinavia), having come over in three boats — one for the Gepids and two for the Goths.
- He stated that the name of the area where the Goths first lived in this area was Gothiscandza, and that this name still existed in the time of Jordanes.
- According to Jordanes, the Goths then moved to an area near the coast inhabited by the "Ulmerugi", thought by some historians to be related to the Rugii named by Tacitus in this region in the first century. The Goths ejected them and took over this country.
- After defeating the Ulmerugi who lived near on Baltic coast, the Goths turned to other neighbours, the Vandals, who they fought and defeated. Wolfram believes that the Gutones did indeed free themselves from Vandalic domination at the beginning of the 2nd century AD.
- After this the population became bigger and the Goths were led by their leader to a fertile part of Scythia, which they called Oium. In this area they defeated a people called the Spali, before moving into the positions around the north of the Black Sea and Lower Danube in which Roman records first mention the Goths in the third century.

Two of the most serious problems with Jordanes' implied equation of the Goths and Gutones of first century literature is the chronology he describes, and his equation of the Goths with the Getae of the Lower Danube. He claims that the Goths/Getae arrived in the Black Sea region more than one thousand years earlier than the third century, and that they subsequently moved to other regions, for example conquering Egypt and Persia, before returning. The equation of the Getae and Goths has not been accepted by modern historians since at least the time of Jakob Grimm.

== Wielbark culture ==
The Gutones, along with their neighbours mentioned by Tacitus, the Rugii and Lemovii, are associated by archaeologists with the Wielbark material culture, which existed in the region of Pomerania and the lower Vistula from the first century CE, and then subsequently expanded towards the south. Historians, based upon the stories of Jordanes, have often associated this with a southwards movement of Gothic people, and/or an expansion of Gothic power. Archaeologists have also confirmed that the Wielbark culture, although it developed locally, shows clear signs of cultural and trading contact with both Scandinavia and towards the Black Sea area where the Goths are later known to have been dominate from the 3rd century CE.

Although Jordanes is not seen by modern scholars as a reliable source, various scenarios concerning the origins of the Goths in the Vistula region are still proposed. Rather than a mass migration, it is now commonly suggested that Goths moved south over time in small groups. It has been suggested that their eventual dominance and large population may have resulted from their military control of important positions along the Amber trade route, and also by their likely taking in of many peoples of diverse origins in the regions where they lived.

== Bibliography ==
Ancient

- Pliny (1855). The Natural History. Translated by Bostock, John. Taylor & Francis. Archived from the original on 6 November 2020.
- Ptolemy (1932). Geography. New York Public Library. Archived from the original on 25 July 2021.
- Strabo (1903). The Natural History. Translated by Hamilton, H. C.; Falconer, W. George Bell & Sons. Archived from the original on 5 December 2020.
- Tacitus (1876a). Germania. Translated by Church, Alfred John; Brodribb, William Jackson. Archived from the original on 25 October 2019.
- Tacitus (1876b). The Annals. Translated by Church, Alfred John; Brodribb, William Jackson. Archived from the original on 29 September 2015.

Modern

- Andersson, Thorsten (1998). "Goten: § 1. Namenkundliches". In Beck, Heinrich [in German]; Steuer, Heiko [in German]; Timpe, Dieter [in German] (eds.). Reallexikon der Germanischen Altertumskunde (in German). Vol. 12. De Gruyter. pp. 402–403. ISBN 3-11-016227-X.
- Christensen, Arne Søby (2002). Cassiodorus, Jordanes and the History of the Goths: Studies in a Migration Myth. Translated by Flegal, Heidi. Museum Tusculanum Press. ISBN 87-7289-7104.
- Halsall, Guy (2007). Barbarian Migrations and the Roman West, 376–568. Cambridge and New York: Cambridge University Press. ISBN 978-0-52143-543-7.
- Heather, Peter (2010). Empires and Barbarians: The Fall of Rome and the Birth of Europe. Oxford University Press. ISBN 9780199892266.
- Rübekeil, Ludwig (2002). "Scandinavia In The Light of Ancient Tradition". In Bandle, Oskar [in German] (ed.). The Nordic Languages. Vol. 1. Walter de Gruyter. pp. 593–604. ISBN 9783110148763.
- Wolfram, Herwig (1988). History of the Goths. Translated by Dunlap, Thomas J. University of California Press. ISBN 0520069838.
