= Peter S. Wells =

American anthropologist and author (born 1948)

- Born: October 9, 1948 (age 77); Boston, Massachusetts
- Education: Harvard University
- Scientific career
- Fields: Anthropology, archaeology
- Institutions: University of Minnesota

Peter S. Wells (born October 9, 1948) is an American anthropologist and author who is Professor of Anthropology at the University of Minnesota.

== Biography ==
Peter S. Wells was born in Boston, Massachusetts on October 9, 1948. Wells received his B.A. from Harvard College in 1970, and his Ph.D. from Harvard University in 1976.

Wells is currently Professor of Anthropology at the University of Minnesota, where he teaches courses on archaeology. He has led a number of important archaeological excavations in Germany. Wells is the author of a number of books on the prehistory of Europe. His book The Barbarians Speak: How the Conquered Peoples Shaped Roman Europe (1999), was awarded the Outstanding Title of 1999 by the Professional and Scholarly Division of the Association of American Publishers. He is an associate editor of the Journal of Indo-European Studies.

== Selected works ==
- Settlement, Economy, and Cultural Change at the End of the European Iron Age: Excavations at Kelheim in Bavaria, 1993
- The Barbarians Speak: How the Conquered Peoples Shaped Roman Europe, 1999
- Beyond Celts, Germans and Scythians: Archaeology and Identity in Iron Age Europe, 2001
- The Battle that Stopped Rome: Emperor Augustus, Arminius, and the Slaughter of the Legions in the Teutoburg Forest, 2003
- Barbarians to Angels: The Dark Ages Reconsidered, 2008
- Image and Response in Early Europe, 2008
- How Ancient Europeans Saw the World: Vision, Patterns, and the Shaping of the Mind in Prehistoric Times, 2012

== Sources ==
- "Peter S. Wells". University of Minnesota.
- "Peter S. Wells". Bloomsbury Publishing.
