= Jordanes =

6th-century Byzantine writer; historian of ancient Romans and Goths

- Born: c. 490 AD
- Died: c. 560 AD (aged 69-70); Byzantine Empire
- Occupations: Writer, historian
- Notable work: Romana, Getica

Jordanes (/dʒɔːrˈdeɪniːz/; Greek: Ιορδάνης, born c. 490 AD - died c. 560 AD), also written as Jordanis or Jornandes, (Note: According to Schanz-Hosius (Geschichte der Römischen Literatur, 4, vol. 2 (1920), pp. 115, 118) the best MSS of his work present his name as Jordanes, as does the 'Geographus Ravennas'. Jordanis is a 'vulgar' form that is also used, while Jornandes appears only in lesser MSS. The form Jornandes, however, was often used in older publications.) was a 6th-century Eastern Roman bureaucrat, (Note: "If Jordanes was a bishop (as is frequently assumed) and if he lived in Italy (also frequently assumed), those elements of his background have left no trace in his two histories." (Croke 1987, p. 119)) of Gothic descent, who became a historian later in life.

He wrote two works, one on Roman history (Romana) and the other on the Goths (Getica). The latter, along with Isidore of Seville's Historia Gothorum, is one of only two extant ancient works dealing with the early history of the Goths. Other writers, such as Procopius, wrote works on the later history of the Goths. Getica has been the object of much critical review. Jordanes wrote in Late Latin rather than the classical Ciceronian Latin. According to his own introduction, he had only three days to review what Cassiodorus had written and so he must also have relied on his own knowledge.

== Life ==
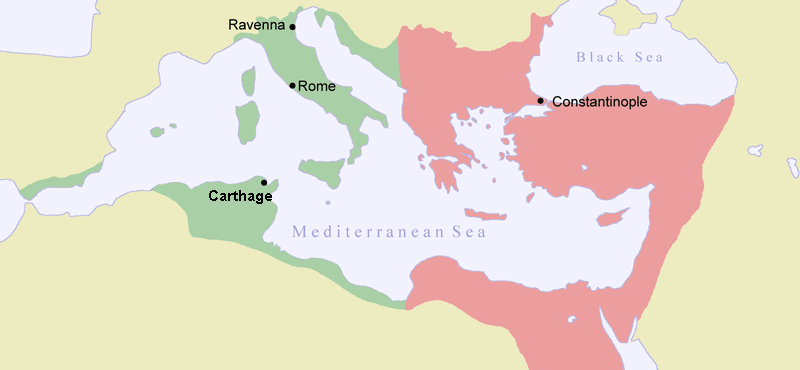
The Mediterranean area c. 550 AD as Jordanes wrote his Getica. The Eastern Roman Empire, whose capital was Constantinople, is shown in pink. Conquests of Justinian I shown in green.

Jordanes writes about himself:

The Sciri, moreover, and the Sadagarii and certain of the Alani with their leader, Candac by name, received Scythia Minor and Lower Moesia. Paria, the father of my father Alanoviiamuth (that is to say, my grandfather), was secretary to this Candac as long as he lived. To his sister's son Gunthigis, also called Baza, the Master of the Soldiery, who was the son of Andag the son of Andela, who was descended from the stock of the Amali, I also, Jordanes, although an unlearned man before my conversion, was secretary.

Paria was Jordanes's paternal grandfather. Jordanes writes that he was secretary to Candac, dux Alanorum, an otherwise unknown leader of the Alans.

Jordanes was asked by a friend to write Getica as a summary of a multi-volume history of the Goths by the statesman Cassiodorus that existed then but has since been lost. Jordanes was selected for his known interest in history and because of his own Gothic background. He had been a high-level notarius, or secretary, of a small client state on the Roman frontier in Scythia Minor, modern southeastern Romania and northeastern Bulgaria.

Jordanes was notarius, or secretary to Gunthigis Baza, a nephew of Candac and a magister militum of the leading Ostrogoth clan of the Amali.

That was ante conversionem meam ("before my conversion"). The nature and the details of the conversion remain obscure. The Goths had been converted with the assistance of Ulfilas (a Goth), made bishop on that account. However, the Goths had adopted Arianism. Jordanes's conversion may have been a conversion to the trinitarian Nicene Creed, which may be expressed in anti-Arianism in certain passages in Getica. In the letter to Vigilius he mentions that he was awakened vestris interrogationibus – "by your questioning".

Alternatively, Jordanes's conversio may mean that he had become a monk, a religiosus or a member of the clergy. Some manuscripts say that he was a bishop, and some even say bishop of Ravenna, but the name Jordanes is not known in the lists of bishops of Ravenna.

== Works ==
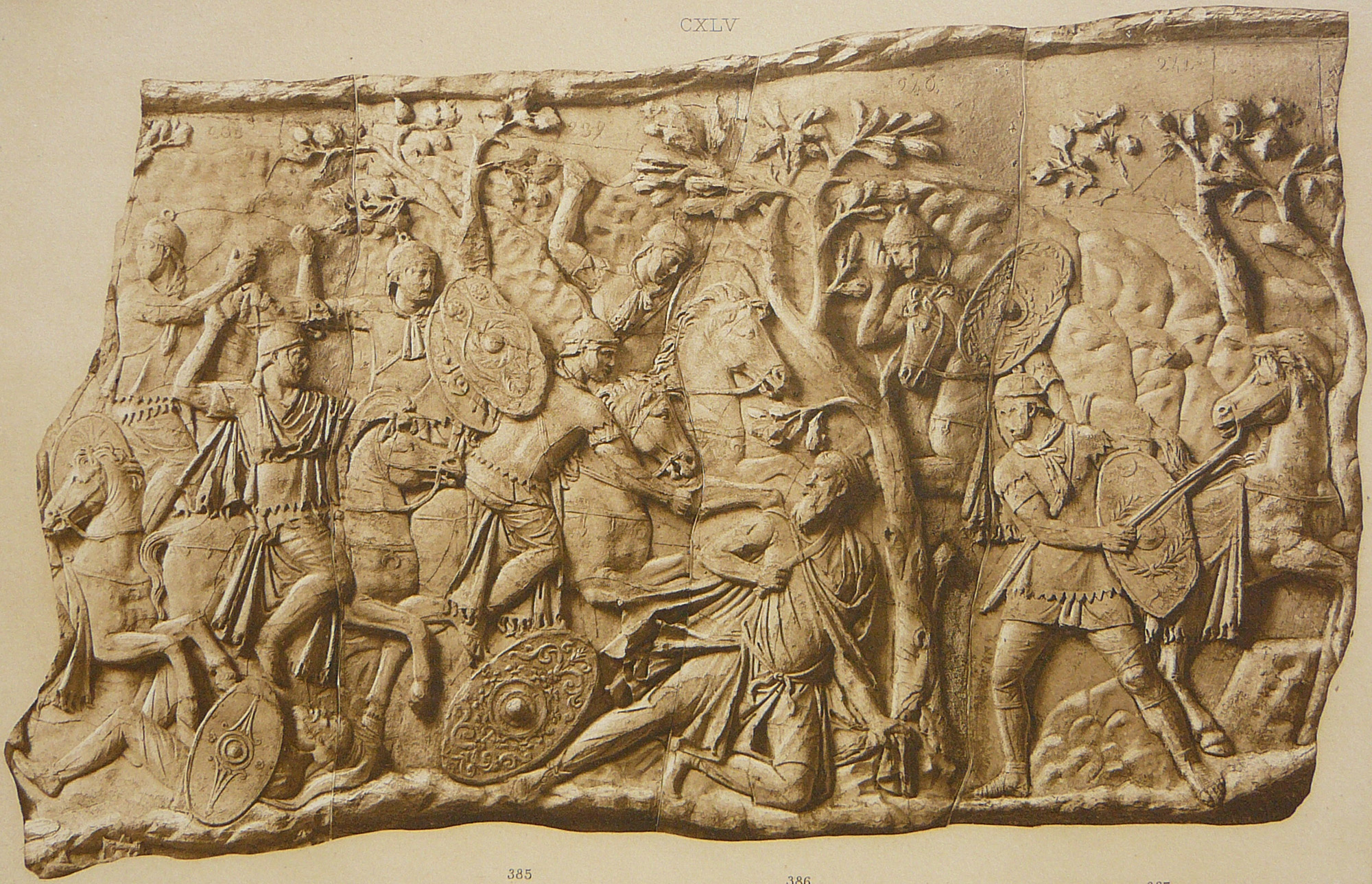
The deeds of Dacians and Getae (here from Trajan's Column) were wrongly attributed to Goths by Jordanes

Jordanes wrote Romana, about the history of Rome, but his best-known work is his Getica, which was written in Constantinople (Note: "Constantinople is 'our city'" (Getica 38).) about 551 AD. (Note: He mentions the great plague of 542 as having occurred "nine years ago" (Getica 104). Still, there are some modern scholars who opt for a later date, see Peter Heather, Goths and Romans 332-489, Oxford 1991, pp. 47-49 (year 552), Walter Goffart, The Narrators of Barbarian History, Princeton 1988, p. 98 (year 554).) Jordanes wrote his Romana at the behest of a certain Vigilius. Although some scholars have identified this person with Pope Vigilius, there is nothing else to support the identification besides the name. The form of address that Jordanes uses and his admonition that Vigilius "turn to God" would seem to rule out this identification.

In the preface to his Getica, Jordanes writes that he is interrupting his work on the Romana at the behest of a brother Castalius, who apparently knew that Jordanes possessed the twelve volumes of the History of the Goths by Cassiodorus. Castalius wanted a short book about the subject, and Jordanes obliged with an excerpt based on memory, possibly supplemented with other material to which he had access. The Getica sets off with a geography/ethnography of the North, especially of Scandza (16–24).

He lets the history of the Goths commence with the emigration of Berig with three ships from Scandza to Gothiscandza (25, 94), in a distant past. In the pen of Jordanes, Herodotus's Getian demigod Zalmoxis becomes a king of the Goths (39). Jordanes tells how the Goths sacked "Troy and Ilium" just after they had recovered somewhat from the war with Agamemnon (108). They are also said to have encountered the Egyptian pharaoh Vesosis (47). The less fictional part of Jordanes's work begins when the Goths encounter Roman military forces in the third century AD. The work concludes with the defeat of the Goths by the Byzantine general Belisarius. Jordanes concludes the work by stating that he writes to honour those who were victorious over the Goths after a history spanning 2,030 years.

== Controversy ==
Jordanes wrongly equated the Getae with the Goths. Many historical records which originally related to Dacians and Getae were thus wrongly attributed to Goths.

Arne Søby Christensen and Michael Kulikowski argue that in his Getica Jordanes also supplemented his Gothic history with many fictional events such as a Gothic war against Egypt.

Caracalla in 213 received the titles "Geticus Maximus" and "Quasi Gothicus" after battles with Getae and Goths.

== See also ==
- History of the Roman Empire

== Sources ==
- Bradley, Dennis R. (1993). ""In Altum Laxare Vela Compulsus": The 'Getica' of Jordanes". Hermes. 121 (2): 211–236. JSTOR 4476955.
- Brodersen, Kai (2013). "Könige im Karpatenbogen" [Kings in the Carpathian Mountains]. Zeitschrift für Siebenbürgische Landeskunde (in German) (36). Heidelberg: 129–146. ISSN 0344-3418.
- Christensen, Arne Søby (2002). Cassiodorus, Jordanes and the History of the Goths: Studies in a Migration Myth. University of Chicago Press. ISBN 978-8-772-89710-3.
- Croke, Brian (1987). "Cassiodorus and the Getica of Jordanes". Classical Philology. 82 (2): 117–134. doi:10.1086/367034. S2CID 162232630.
- Croke, Brian (2005). "Jordanes and the Immediate Past". Historia: Zeitschrift für Alte Geschichte. 54 (4): 473–494. JSTOR 4436790.
- Doležal, Stanislav (2014). "Who was Jordanes?". Byzantion. 84: 145–164. JSTOR 44173397.
- Goffart, Walter (April 2005). "Jordanes's "Getica" and the Disputed Authenticity of Gothic Origins from Scandinavia". Speculum. 80 (2): 379–398. doi:10.1017/S0038713400000038. JSTOR 20463271. S2CID 163064058.
- Grillone, Antonino (December 2004). "Altri apporti della terza famiglia ai "Getica" di Giordanes". Museum Helveticum (in Italian). 61 (4): 208–221. JSTOR 24825243.
- Heather, Peter (1989). "Cassiodorus and the Rise of the Amals: Genealogy and the Goths under Hun Domination". The Journal of Roman Studies. 79: 103–128. doi:10.2307/301183. JSTOR 301183. S2CID 162977685.
- Jordanes. Vanderspoel, J (ed.). Getica: The Origin and Deeds of the Goths. Translated by Charles C. Mierow. 266.
- Jordanes. De origine actibusque Getarum L (in Latin). Archived from the original on 13 February 2008.
- Kulikowski, Michael (2007). Rome's Gothic Wars: From the Third Century to Alaric. Key Conflicts of Classical Antiquity (1st ed.). Cambridge University Press. p. 130. ISBN 978-052184633-2.
- Mierow, Charles Christopher (1966). The Gothic History of Jordanes: In English with an Introduction and a Commentary. Speculum Historiale.
- O'Donnell, James J. (1982). "The Aims of Jordanes". Historia. 31: 223–240. Archived from the original on 9 November 2007.
- Thunberg, Carl L. (2012). Att tolka Svitjod [To interpret Svitjod]. University of Gothenburg/CLTS. pp. 44–46. ISBN 978-91-981859-4-2.
- Van Hoof, Lieve; Van Nuffelen, Peter (2017). "The Historiography of Crisis". The Journal of Roman Studies. 107: 275–300. doi:10.1017/S0075435817000284. JSTOR 26576052. S2CID 232343702.
