= Arne Søby Christensen =

Danish historian (born 1945)

- Born: 1945 (age 80–81); Copenhagen, Denmark

Academic work
- Discipline: History
- Institutions: University of Copenhagen
- Notable works: Cassiodorus, Jordanes and the History of the Goths

Arne Søby Christensen (born 1945) is a Danish historian. He is an associate professor in history at the University of Copenhagen.

== Biography ==
Arne Søby Christensen was born in Copenhagen in 1945. He received a cand.mag. in history from the University of Copenhagen in 1975. His book Lactantius the Historian was published in 1980. From 1989 to 1998, Christensen was a member of the Danish Historical Society.

The basic contention of this book is that nothing in the first third of Jordanes's Getica has anything whatsoever to do with a history of the Goths.

— Arne Søby Christensen

Christensen received his PhD in history from the University of Copenhagen in June 2002. His disputation was supervised by Ian N. Wood and Niels Lund. His thesis, Cassiodorus, Jordanes and the History of the Goths, concerned the reliability of Getica by Jordanes and the latter's alleged chief source, the now lost Origo Gothica by Cassiodorus. In his thesis, Christensen claims that the Origo Gothica and Getica are entirely fabricated accounts without any foundation in Gothic oral tradition, being instead based upon a dubious synthesis of Greco-Roman sources. Christensen claims that the Greco-Romans knew nothing about the Goths until the 3rd century AD, and that archaeological evidence on Gothic origins is useless. On this account, Christensen recommended that the history of the migration period be rewritten.

An English translation of Christensen's thesis was published in 2002 by Museum Tusculanum Press. Christensen's thesis has generated much interest among scholars. It was praised by Walter Goffart as a useful work. Anthropologist Peter S. Wells considered it a significant contribution to the study of ancient peoples of northern Europe. Ian N. Wood considered it an interesting work, although he thought Christensen went too far in denying Gothic elements in the texts. Sigbjørn Sønnesyn considered Christensen's theories suspiciously similar to circular reasoning. Michael Whitby dismissed Christensen's work as extreme and a mere footnote to what has already been written on the subject. Dick Harrison considered Christensen's book interesting, although he criticized its rejection of archaeological evidence and refusal to respond to the views of dissenting scholars.

== Selected works ==
- Kristenforfølgelserne i Rom indtil år 250, 1977
- Lactantius the Historian. An Analysis of the De Mortibus Persecutorum., 1980
- Cassiodorus, Jordanes and the History of the Goths: Studies in a Migration Myth, 2002

== Bibliography ==
Christensen, Arne Søby (2002). Cassiodorus, Jordanes and the History of the Goths: Studies in a Migration Myth. Translated by Flegal, Heidi. Museum Tusculanum Press. ISBN 87-7289-7104.
