= Zorita =

Zorita may refer to:

== Places ==
- Zorita, Cáceres, a municipality in the province of Cáceres, Extremadura, Spain
- Zorita de la Frontera, a locality and municipality in the province of Salamanca
- Zorita de los Canes, a locality and municipality in the province of Guadalajara
- Zorita del Maestrazgo, a locality and municipality in the province of Castellón
- Albalate de Zorita, a locality and municipality in the province of Guadalajara
- Almonacid de Zorita, a locality and municipality in the province of Guadalajara
- Castle of Zorita de los Canes-Alcazaba de Zorita, a castle in the province of Guadalajara
- José Cabrera Nuclear Power Station, a former nuclear power plant also known as Zorita

== Other uses ==
- Zorita (burlesque dancer), American burlesque dancer
- Eduardo Zorita, Spanish paleoclimatologist
- Vicente Zorita Alonso, Spanish politician killed by the ETA
- Zorita (band), a Dutch folk band

== See also ==
- Zorica, a feminine given name
