= Castle of Zorita de los Canes-Alcazaba de Zorita =

- Castillo de Zorita de los Canes-Alcazaba de Zorita (Spanish)
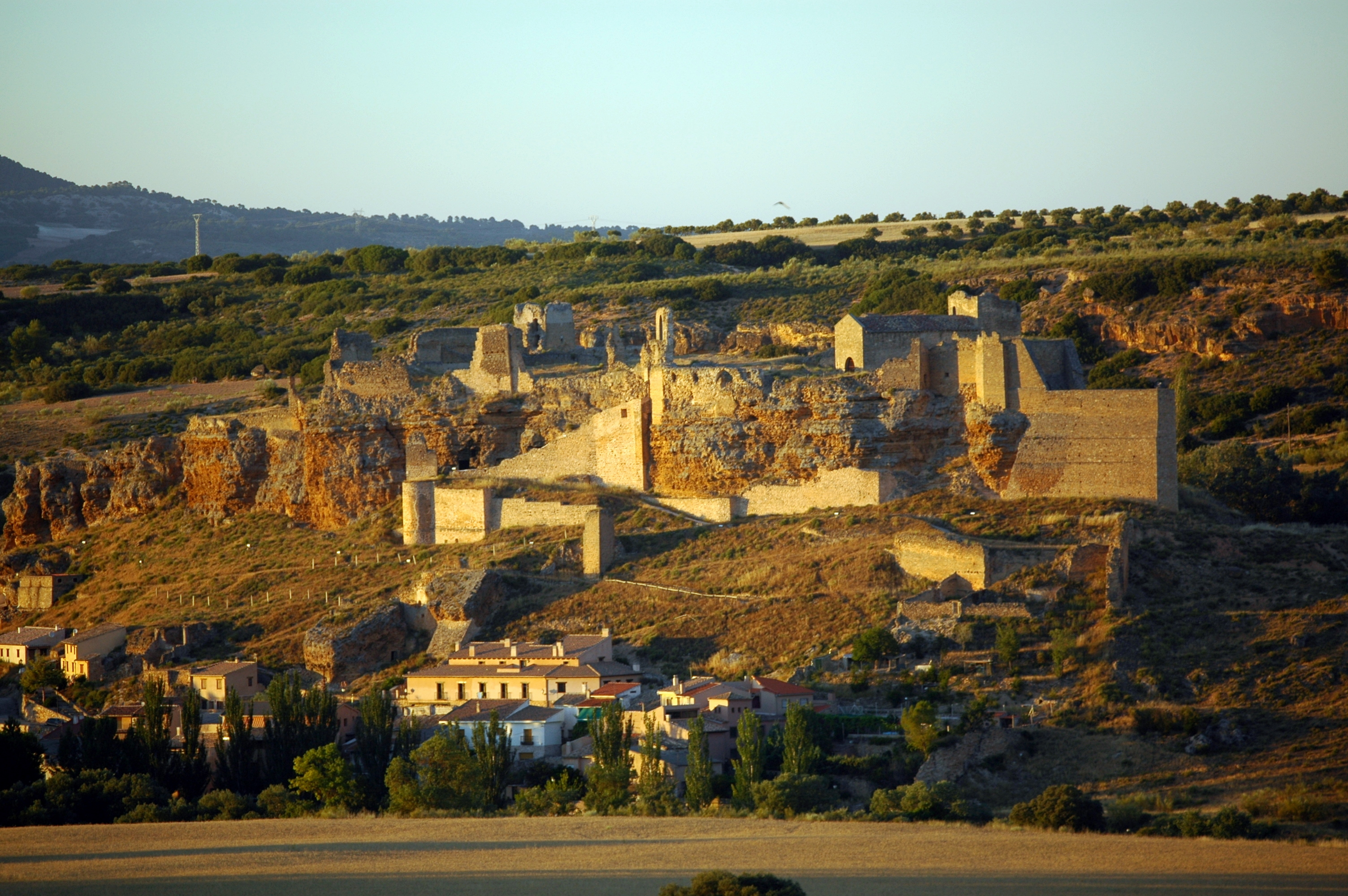

- Location within Spain
- 40.331679°N 2.887496°W
- Location: Zorita de los Canes, Spain

Spanish Cultural Heritage
- Official name: Castillo de Zorita de los Canes-Alcazaba de Zorita
- Type: Non-movable
- Criteria: Monument
- Designated: 1931
- Reference no.: RI-51-0000611

The Castle of Zorita de los Canes-Alcazaba de Zorita (Spanish: Castillo de Zorita de los Canes-Alcazaba de Zorita) is a castle located in Zorita de los Canes, Spain. It was declared Bien de Interés Cultural in 1931.

== History ==
The fortress of Zorita was ordered to be built on a rocky hill by the emir Muhammad I of Córdoba at the beginning of his rule, in the year 852, for the defense of the passage of the Tagus river through the Santaver cora. Given the characteristics of the rock on which it sits, made of sandstone, it needed to be reformed from the beginning, the first of which dates back to the year 853. The horseshoe arch at the entrance to the citadel is still preserved from this period.

The citadel was the center of various rebellions against the power of the Cordoban emir, such as the one carried out by Umar ibn Hafsun in 886, who left Zorita to sack Toledo. Abd al-Rahman III also used the Zorita citadel in his campaign to recover the Santaver cora in 924 and was the center of the subsequent years of the rebellions against the Caliph of Córdoba.

In the middle of the 11th century Al-Mamun of Toledo ceded the city of Guadalajara, Spain and a large part of La Alcarria, including the area of Zorita, to Alfonso VI of León and Castile in order to help him occupy the throne of Castile against his brother Sancho II of Castile and León, so the city passed into Castilian hands as soon as Alfonso acceded to the throne in 1072. In 1097 Alfonso VI appointed Álvar Fáñez mayor of Zorita, although he was defeated in 1110 by Almoravid troops, they later recovered the citadel. In 1124 it was conquered by the Knights Templar for the Kingdom of Castile, who could barely hold it against the Almohad troops.

In 1174 Alfonso VIII of Castile ceded the fortress of Zorita to the new Order of Calatrava, which they continued to use as a stronghold against the increasingly rare Andalusian incursions, and in 1180 he granted Zorita a charter, which included the right of pontazgo, making from the town a place of passage protected by its castle. Within the enclosure of the citadel, the order of Calatrava built some monastic dependencies that were the center of the order at the beginning of the 13th century. The citadel was the main refuge of the Order of Calatrava after its defeat in the Battle of Alarcos in 1195, from where it reorganized. To do this, they reinforced the castle with new walls and dependencies, including the church inside. It was the center of the order until the Castilian victory at the Battle of Las Navas de Tolosa in 1212, when it returned to control its domains from Calatrava la Nueva.

In the mid-14th century there was a power struggle in the Order of Calatrava between the master Garci López de Padilla and the commanders of Zorita, "don Alemán" and Núñez de Prado, sponsored by Ferdinand IV of Castile. After years of fighting, already with Alfonso XI of Castile on the throne of Castile, and after the death of Padilla in 1334, the royal troops surrounded the castle and overthrew the warden Gonzalo Pérez. Those battles caused serious damage to the citadel.

In 1443, in a new schism of the Order of Calatrava, where up to three Calatraves declared themselves masters, the castle fell into the hands of the Major Commander Juan Ramírez de Guzmán, who used it as a base for the control of the Alcarria in the hands of the Calatraves. After two years, Ramírez de Guzmán lost his battle against Pedro Girón Acuña Pacheco.

With the growth of Almonacid de Zorita at the end of the 15th century, by preference of the Order of Calatrava, and Pastrana in the 16th century, the decline of Zorita began. In 1565 Zorita and its castle were bought by Ruy Gómez de Silva, 1st Prince of Éboli, who did not inhabit it because it no longer offered conditions for residence. Since then, the castle has remained unused, in a state of neglect and in progressive ruin.
