= Madrona (Segovia) =

- Village
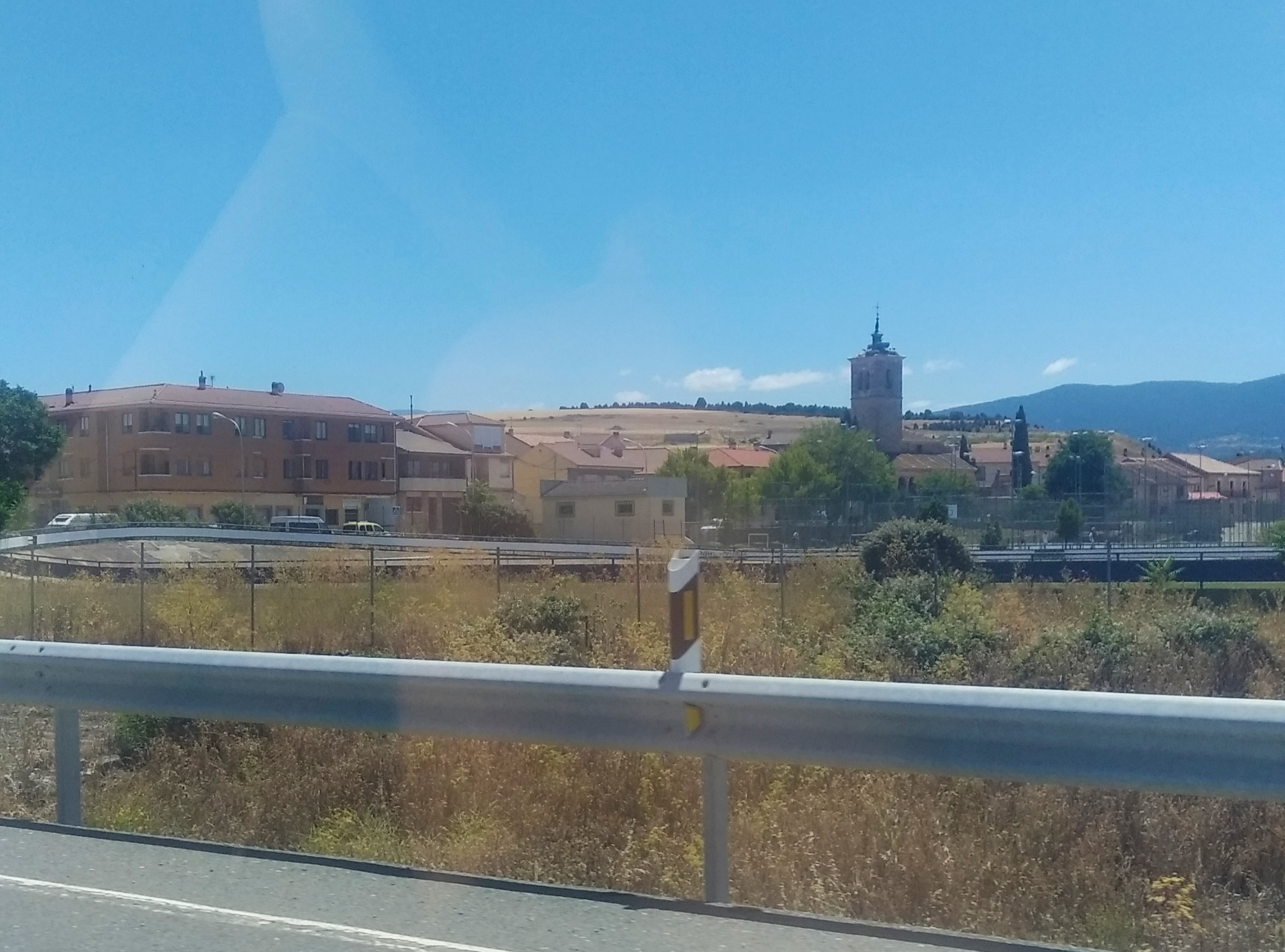
- Madrona, seen from the N-110

- Location within Spain
- Coordinates: 40°53′52″N 4°10′17″W
- Country: Spain
- Autonomous community: Castile and León
- Province: Segovia
- Municipality: Segovia

Population (2022)
  - Total: 433

Madrona is a village in the municipality of Segovia, in the province of Segovia, in the autonomous community of Castile and León, Spain. In 2020 it had 423 inhabitants.

== Demography ==
Historical population
Year	Pop.	±%
2000	432	—
2002	474	+9.7%
2004	471	−0.6%
2006	499	+5.9%
2008	515	+3.2%
2010	493	−4.3%
2012	480	−2.6%
2014	449	−6.5%
Source: INE

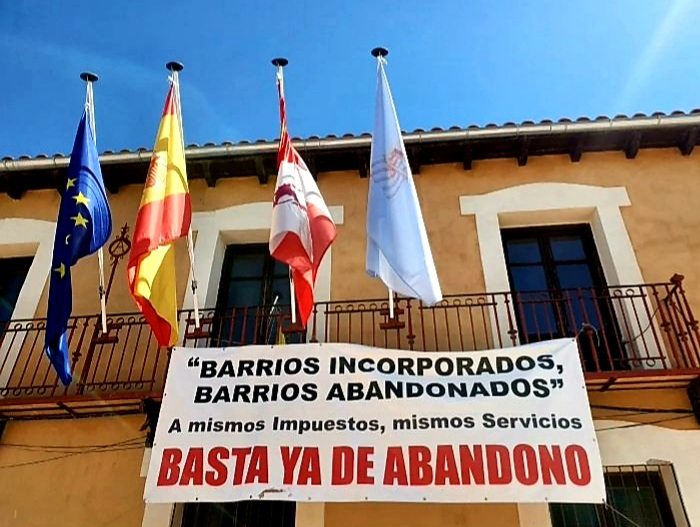
Poster placed in Madrona placed by the neighborhood association after the annexation to Segovia
