= Paul Petit (historian) =

French historian

Paul Petit (1914 – 1981/06/14) was a 20th-century French historian, a specialist in ancient Rome. He was a professor at the University of Grenoble.

Paul Petit's books covered a multitude of issues in relation to Rome and the Roman institutions, For example, in his book Histoire générale de l'Empire romain, pages 178–179, he dealt with the Cursus honorum of a senator's son.

== Bibliography ==
- 1962: Précis d'Histoire Ancienne
- 1967: La paix romaine, Presses universitaires de France, series "Nouvelle Clio – L’histoire et ses problèmes"
- 1974: Histoire générale de l’Empire romain, Le Seuil, ISBN 2020026775
