= Zorita (band) =

Dutch folk band

Zorita is a Dutch band that was formed in 2009. Their music might be best classified as folk with influences of pop and world music.

The group released its debut album Amor Y Muerte in May 2012. The band made appearances at Lowlands, Oerol and Zwarte Cross. In June 2013 they performed at the Dutch TV programme Vrije Geluiden. A tour through Great Britain in August 2014, where they played at Boomtown, was captured in the music documentary Until We Die. The documentary was released in April 2015, together with the EP Until We Die.

== Band members ==
- Carlos Zorita Diaz – vocals, guitar, tres, charango
- Jarno van Es – keys, accordion
- Joost Abbel – guitar, banjo, pedal steel guitar
- Robert Koomen – bass, vocals
- René van Haren – trombone
- Thomas Geerts – trumpet, flugelhorn
- Abel de Vries – drums, percussion

== Discography ==
- Aphrodite (2017)
- Until We Die (2015)
- Amor Y Muerte (2012)
