= Lotte Hedeager =

Danish archaeologist (born 1948)

- Born: 24 February 1948 (age 78); Denmark

Academic background
- Education: University of Copenhagen; Aarhus University

Academic work
- Discipline: Archaeology
- Sub-discipline: Prehistoric Archaeology
- Institutions: University of Oslo
- Main interests: Iron Age Scandinavia
- Notable works: Iron Age Societies. From Tribe to State in Northern Europe (1992)

Lotte Hedeager (born 24 February 1948) is a Danish archaeologist who is Professor of Archaeology at the University of Oslo.

== Biography ==
Lotte Hedeager was born in Copenhagen on 24 February 1948. She gained her MA in prehistoric archaeology at the University of Copenhagen in 1978, and her PhD at the University of Århus in 1990. In 1996, Hedeager was appointed Professor of Archaeology at the University of Oslo. She specializes in the study of Iron Age Scandinavia. She is a fellow of the Norwegian Academy of Science and Letters.

== Selected works ==
- Iron Age Societies. From Tribe to State in Northern Europe, 1992
