= Zorita de los Canes =

Zorita de los Canes, Spain
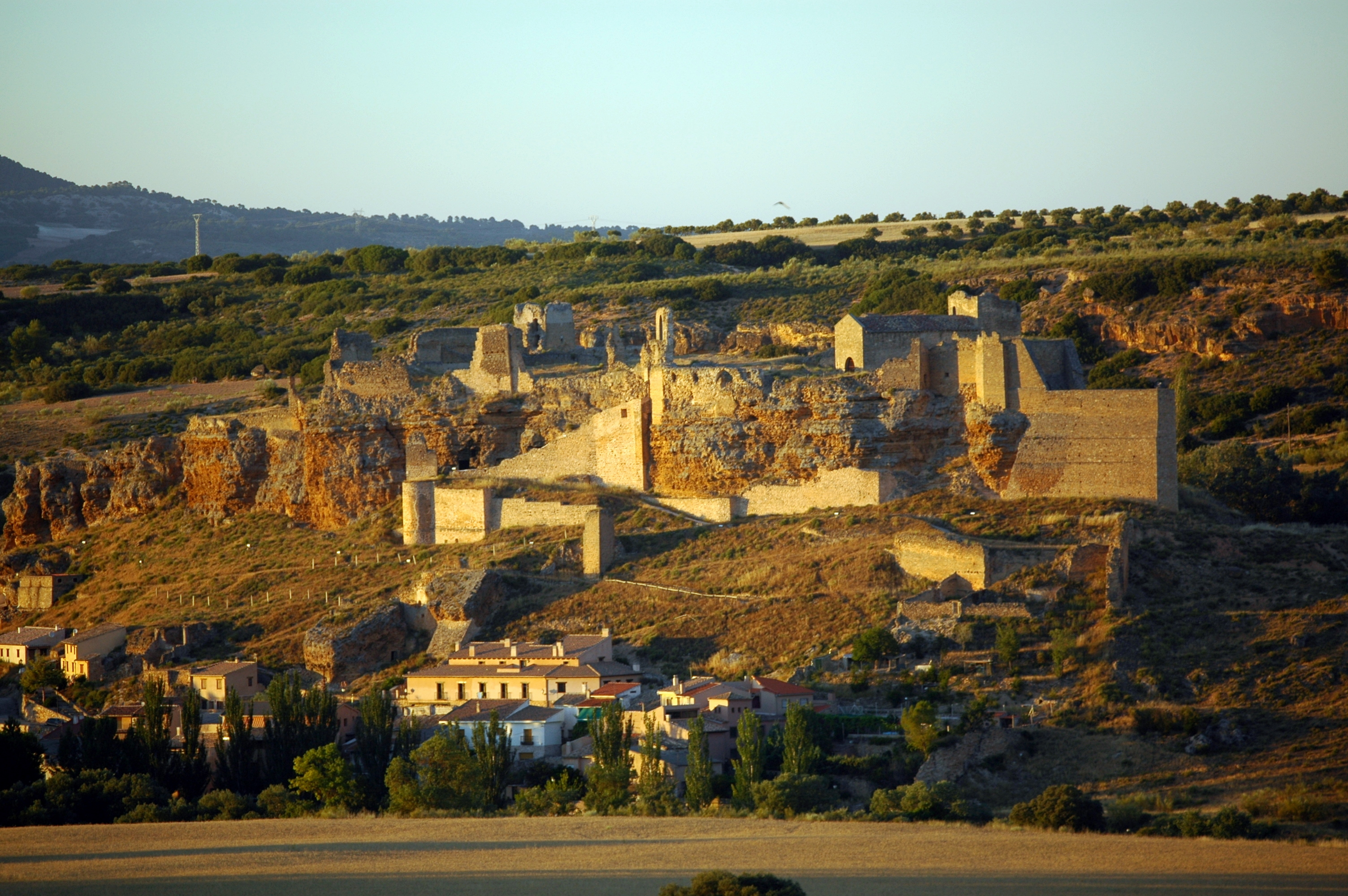
- 'Alcazaba of Zorita', Zorita de los Canes

- Coat of arms

- Location in Guadalajara Location in Castilla-La Mancha Location in Spain
- Coordinates: 40°19′53″N 2°59′20″W
- Country: Spain
- Autonomous community: Castile-La Mancha
- Province: Guadalajara
- Comarca: La Alcarria
- Municipality: Zorita de los Canes

Area
  - Total: 20.23 km^{2} (7.81 sq mi)
- Elevation: 590 m (1,940 ft)

Population (2025-01-01)
  - Total: 72
  - Density: 3.6/km^{2} (9.2/sq mi)
- Time zone: UTC+1 (CET)
  - Summer (DST): UTC+2 (CEST)

Zorita de los Canes is a municipality located in the province of Guadalajara, Castile-La Mancha, Spain. According to the 2004 census (INE), the municipality has a population of 98 inhabitants. The Castle of Zorita de los Canes-Alcazaba de Zorita is located in the municipality.

The castle was given to Alfonso VIII in 1174 and was in the possession of the Dukes of Pastrana until 1723, when ownership was given to the Counts of San Rafael.
