= 489 =

Calendar year

489 in various calendars
- Gregorian calendar: 489; CDLXXXIX
- Ab urbe condita: 1242
- Assyrian calendar: 5239
- Balinese saka calendar: 410–411
- Bengali calendar: −105 – −104
- Berber calendar: 1439
- Buddhist calendar: 1033
- Burmese calendar: −149
- Byzantine calendar: 5997–5998
- Chinese calendar: 戊辰年 (Earth Dragon); 3186 or 2979 — to — 己巳年 (Earth Snake); 3187 or 2980
- Coptic calendar: 205–206
- Discordian calendar: 1655
- Ethiopian calendar: 481–482
- Hebrew calendar: 4249–4250
- Hindu calendars
- Vikram Samvat: 545–546
- Shaka Samvat: 410–411
- Kali Yuga: 3589–3590
- Holocene calendar: 10489
- Iranian calendar: 133 BP – 132 BP
- Islamic calendar: 137 BH – 136 BH
- Javanese calendar: 375–376
- Julian calendar: 489; CDLXXXIX
- Korean calendar: 2822
- Minguo calendar: 1423 before ROC 民前1423年
- Nanakshahi calendar: −979
- Seleucid era: 800/801 AG
- Thai solar calendar: 1031–1032
- Tibetan calendar: ས་ཕོ་འབྲུག་ལོ་ (male Earth-Dragon); 615 or 234 or −538 — to — ས་མོ་སྦྲུལ་ལོ་ (female Earth-Snake); 616 or 235 or −537

Year 489 (CDLXXXIX) was a common year starting on Sunday of the Julian calendar. At the time, it was known as the Year of the Consulship of Probinus and Eusebius (or, less frequently, year 1242 Ab urbe condita). The denomination 489 for this year has been used since the early medieval period, when the Anno Domini calendar era became the prevalent method in Europe for naming years.

== Events ==
=== By place ===
==== Byzantine Empire ====
- Emperor Zeno closes the School of Edessa (modern Turkey) for their teaching of Nestorian doctrine, whereupon the scholars seek refuge at the Syriac Church of the East.

==== Europe ====
- August – Battle of Sirmium in Pannonia: The Ostrogoths under Theodoric the Great, moving to invade Northern Italy at the behest of Eastern Roman Emperor Zeno, defeat the Gepids attempting to stop their advance.
- August 28 – After crossing the Julian Alps, the Ostrogoths defeat the overwhelming forces of Odoacer at the Battle of Isonzo (near Roman Aquileia or modern Soča) and enter Italy. This date is subsequently used by Theodoric to establish a 30-year statute of limitations (tricennium) ending on 28 August 519, after which any unlawful seizure of land during this period can no longer be contested.
- September 30 – Battle of Verona: Odoacer is defeated again by Theodoric for a second time. He retreats to the impregnable capital of Ravenna.
- The Ostrogoths capture the cities Pavia and Milan. The majority of Odoacer's army, including his magister militum Tufa, surrenders to Theodoric.

=== By topic ===
==== Religion ====
- The first Temple of Confucius is constructed in Northern China (outside the ancestral temple at Qufu).

== Deaths ==
- Acacius, patriarch of Constantinople
- Modest, bishop of Trier
- Sidonius Apollinaris, bishop and diplomat
- Wang Jian, official of Liu Song and Southern Qi (b. 452)
