= Battle of Faenza (490) =

| Date | 490 |
| Location | Faenza, Italy |
| Result | Odoacer's victory |

Belligerents
| Kingdom of Odoacer | Ostrogoths |

Commanders and leaders
| Odoacer | Theodoric the Great |

Strength
| Unknown | Unknown |

Casualties and losses
| Unknown | Unknown |

The Battle of Faenza was fought between the Kingdom of Odoacer and the Ostrogoths under Theodoric the Great. With the permission of the Eastern Roman emperor Zeno, Theodoric had in 488 gained permission to invade Italy and depose Odoacer. Having previously been defeated by Theodoric at Isonzo and Verona, Odoacer retreated to his heavily fortified capital Ravenna in October 489. After receiving reinforcements from Southern Italy, Odoacer defeated Theodoric at Faenza in 490. After his victory, Odoacer pursued Theodoric to Pavia, where he was defeated on August 11, 490, at the Battle of the Adda River, after which he retreated back to Ravenna.

== Sources ==
- Tucker, Spencer C. (2009). A Global Chronology of Conflict: From the Ancient World to the Modern Middle East [6 volumes]: From the Ancient World to the Modern Middle East. ABC-CLIO. ISBN 978-1851096725.
