= Turcilingi =

Barbarian people in 5th-century Europe

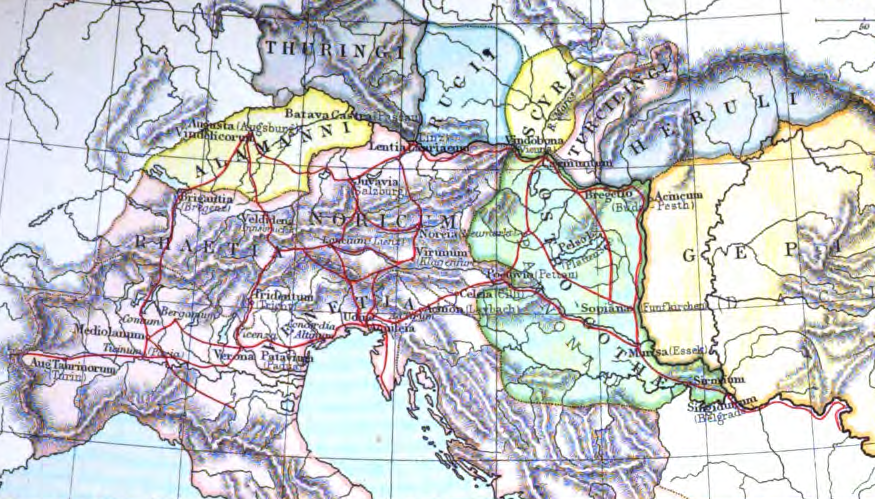
Thomas Hodgkin's map of barbarian peoples during the time of Augustulus, from his Italy and Her Invaders. The location of the Turcilingi is only a guess.

The Turcilingi (also spelled Torcilingi or Thorcilingi) were an obscure barbarian people, or possibly a clan or dynasty, who appear in a small number of records relating to non-Roman soldiers serving within the empire under Odoacer in the 5th century AD. The 6th-century writer Jordanes indicated that Odoacer himself was considered a Turcilingian, although his descriptions of Odoacer's ethnic background are difficult to interpret.

Jordanes was the only near contemporary source to mention the Turcilingi. He made it clear that "Torcilingi" soldiers were present among the Roman auxiliaries serving under Odoacer in Italy, where they took part in his overthrow of the western emperor, Romulus Augustulus (reigned 475–76). Odoacer was described by Jordanes as a "king" of the Torcilingi, but also similarly a ruler of the Rugian, Heruli and Sciri soldiers. Under his leadership these forces also killed the father of the emperor, Orestes, and took control of Roman Italy. Although the homeland of the Turcilingi is never mentioned, the Sciri, Rugii and Heruli are all known to be among the several non-Roman peoples who had been living in the Middle Danubian region within the empire of Attila the Hun, and had established independent chiefdoms after his death in 453. Centuries after Jordanes, Paul the Deacon, who cited and used Jordanes as a source, explicitly listed the "Turcilingi" together with the Sciri, Rugii, and Heruli, among the peoples who had been among the Middle Danubian peoples who fought for Attila, before the time of Odoacer.

As with Odoacer himself, from the surviving records it has not been possible for modern scholars to reach a consensus about the origins, ethnic affiliations and original language of the Turcilingi. Apart from Jordanes and Paul the Deacon, scholars also believe that a Greek fragment which describes the brother and father of Odoacer as Thuringians, was rightly or wrongly using the term to refer to the same people referred to as Turcilingi by Jordanes and Paul, who were associated with Odoacer. Some scholars go as far as accepting that the Turcilingi were the same as the Thuringi, opening the possibility that the term used by Jordanes may simply have been an error. By the 6th century the Thuringi had established a kingdom based significantly north of the Danube in what is now central Germany, but their earlier history is unknown. The Thuringi were, like the Turcilingi, first mentioned in the 5th century, but only in a text which mentioned that they bred a useful type of horse, similar to those bred by the Burgundians.

A second scholarly proposal which has been seen renewed interest since the 1980s is that the Turcilingi, and perhaps the Thuringi, may have somehow been connected to the earlier Tervingi. These were a Gothic people from eastern Europe, who had crossed the Danube into the Roman empire in the 4th century, well before Odoacer. The three names involved in these speculations can not however be connected in terms of any known regular language evolutions. If the names are related then it must have involved specific misunderstandings or ideas which can now only be speculated about.

== Primary sources ==
All use of the term Turcilingi might go back to only one independent source, the 6th century writer Jordanes. He mentioned the "Thorcilingi" or "Torcilingi" in three descriptions of Odoacer in his works, twice in his Getica and once in his Romana.

- Firstly, according to Jordanes, when the Roman military leader Orestes, made his son Romulus Augustus emperor, Odoacer "king of the Torcilingi" (rex Torcilingorum), along with Sciri and Heruli, and auxiliary troops from various peoples (Latin: gentes), occupied Italy and killed Orestes, and deposed Romulus Augustus. Jordanes also calls Odoacer "king of the gentes".
- Secondly, when describing this same sequence of events in his Romana, Jordanes describes Odoacer as being "of Rogus-descent, strengthened by crowds of Thorcilingi, of Sciri and of Heruli" (genere Rogus Thorcilingorum Scirorum Herolorumque turbas munitus).
- Thirdly, when Theodoric the Great was looking for a pretext to invade Italy in 493, according to Jordanes he petitioned the Eastern Roman Emperor Zeno by reminding him that the city of Rome was in turmoil under the "tyranny" (unlawful rule) of the king of the Thorcilingi and of the Rogi (sub regis Thorcilingorum Rogorumque tyrranide fluctuatur).

In 1946, Reynolds and Lopez noted that when referring to Odoacer Jordanes consistently writes the word often translated as "Rugii", and normally equated to the name of a Middle Danubian Germanic people, with an "o" and not a "u". They therefore proposed that the version in the Romana could be read as "offspring of a person named Rogus", and they connected this to the fact that a person called Rogas or Ruga or Rugila had been recorded as an uncle of Attila. They therefore proposed that the key passage in Jordanes originally meant "Torcilingi-king, of the stock of Rogus, with Sciri and Herul followers". Other historians have objected to this translation. For example Maenchen-Helfen wrote that "Jordanes certainly wrote a queer sort of Latin, but genere Rogus means even in the most debased Latin 'by origin a Rogus', that is 'a Rugian'."

Centuries later, the Turcilingi (with a u) were also mentioned in the works of Paul the Deacon, in both his Historia Langobardorum and Historia Romana.

- In the opening chapter of his history of the Lombards he names several peoples including Goths, Vandals, Rugii, Heruli, and "Turcilingi", who have come, he says, from Germania to Italy. He goes on to name the Lombards, his main topic, as latecomers from the same region.
- When describing the nations subject to Odoacer's rule, who fought on his side when he attacked the Rugian kingdom of Feletheus, he listed the Turcilingi and the Heruli and a "part of the Rugii".
- In his history of Rome, when listing the nations who were under Attila, Paul the Deacon listed the Heruli, and the Turcilingi "also called Rugii" (Eruli Turcilingi sive Rugi) as nations under him with their own petty kings. He indicated that these were among the forces who could be called upon for the campaign in Gaul which occurred in 451.
- In a subsequent passage, Paul described the meeting of Odoacer with Saint Severinus of Noricum, after Orestes (father of Romulus Augustulus) had expelled Julius Nepos from Rome. He says that Odoacer was at this time making his way to Italy with a large force of Heruli supported by auxiliaries of the Turcilingi, "also called Sciri" (cum fortissima Herolorum multitudine fretus insuper Turcilingorum sive Scirorum auxiliis).

Krautschick notes that Maenchen-Helfen, in his critique of Reynolds and Lopez, missed the fact that Paul the Deacon actually equated the Torcilingi to the Sciri in one passage, and the Rugii in another. Nevertheless, he claims Paul could not have known any other source than Jordanes, and so these equations can be seen as attempts to explain the several confusing remarks of Jordanes regarding Odoacer’s kingships.

Apart from Jordanes and Paul the Deacon, there are several later references to the Torcilingi or Thorcilingi including Hugh of Fleury's Chronicon; Freculphus of Lisieux's Chronicon; Hermannus Contractus, Chronicon; Bernold of Constance, Chronicon; and also in a Chronicon which was possibly by Ekkehard of Aura. However, these are generally accepted as being derived from Jordanes or Paul.

In an account of the mythical origins of the Franks, Fredegar (writing in the middle of the 7th century), mentioned the Torci as a people descended from the Trojans and related to the Franks, living in eastern Europe. Claude Cahen argued that these were a remnant of the Turcilingi.

== Language and name ==
Scholars debate about whether the Turcilingi were a Germanic people who spoke a Germanic language, or else a Hunnic people who spoke a Turkic language.

Since the 19th century, the Turcilingi have traditionally been considered to have been Germanic. In 1837 Johann Kaspar Zeuss, followed by Karl Müllenhoff, proposed that the Turcilingi descended from the Ῥουτίχλειοι (Rhoutíkhleioi) mentioned in the Geographia of Ptolemy (II.11.7) as living near the Baltic Sea in the second century. This specific thesis requires a complex etymological argument, which is no longer accepted by scholars.

In 1946, Reynolds and Lopez argued that Odoacer's father was in fact a Hun, and that the Torcilingi and Scirii were also Huns. This is based on the fact that a man with the same name as Odoacer's father, Edeka, was described as a Hun by the contemporary source Priscus. This proposal was criticized by Maenchen-Helfen in a communication in 1947, but the idea became influential, and was accepted by well-known historians such as J. M. Wallace-Hadrill, and E. A. Thompson, and included in volume 2 of the reference work Prosopography of the Later Roman Empire (PLRE), although many scholars have continued to object.

The problem of identification is also sometimes approached through etymology. Etymological proposals are connected to the question whether the Turcilingi were Germanic or not. The root Turci- has led some scholars to suggest that they were a Turkic-speaking tribe. The -ling suffix is Germanic, denoting members of a line, usually one descended from a common ancestor. Kim believes the name is a Germanization of a Turkic name.

Many historians such as Herwig Wolfram have continued to accept that the names of Odoacer and his family were Germanic in origin. However, he argued that debate about whether they were Huns is meaningless, because under Attila there was probably no separate Scirian political identity. He believed it was possible that the Turcilingi were a Scirian royal clan, or the same as the Thuringians.

== Possible connections to the Thuringi or Tervingi ==
In recent scholarship the Turcilingi have been identified with the Thuringi by Helmut Castritius and Wolfram Brandes, and this conclusion has begun to gain more acceptance. The reasoning is based on upon the facts that the Suda, apparently drawing upon a 5th century contemporary historian, describes Odoacer's brother Onoulphus as a Thuringian on his father's side and Scirian on his mother's. While many scholars such as Hyun Jin Kim argue that the Suda (or its source) is mistaken, other scholars, such as MacGeorge and Brandes, have argued that the name "Thorcilingi", found originally only in Jordanes, must be the mistaken one. While there is no standard linguistic explanation for the change in the word, Brandes argues that it could have been a one-off misunderstanding created by the existence of a similar term Turci.

Kim, in contrast, thinks the Suda contains a hypercorrection by a scribe who did not recognise the Turcilingi. Jordanes also refers separately to both the Thorcilingi, in the context of Odoacer, and the Thuringians. Concerning the latter he refers once to Hermanafrid king of the "Thuringi", once to the "Thuringi" living north of the Alamanni, once to their quality of horses, in a passage where there are several spelling variants in manuscripts (Thyringi, Tyringi, Thiringi, Thoringi, Thoring). Kim argues that the Turcilingi were "a Turkic-speaking tribe under Hunnic rule ... probably of mixed origin ... with possibly a Germanic and Turkic (Hunnic) mixture." Cahen, too, argued they were Turkic-speaking Huns.

There is also a scholarly proposal that the Thuringi were in some way a continuation of the Tervingi. These were a Gothic people from Eastern Europe, who had crossed the Danube into the Roman empire in the generations before Odoacer. The three names involved in these speculations can not however be explained in terms of any known regular language evolutions. If the names are related then it must have involved specific misunderstandings or ideas which can now only be speculated about.

== Sources ==
- Brandes, Wolfram (2009), "Thüringer/Thüringerinnen in byzantinischen Quellen", in Castritius, Helmut; Geuenich, Dieter; Werner, Matthias (eds.), Die Frühzeit der Thüringer, Reallexikon der Germanischen Altertumskunde - Ergänzungsbände, vol. 63, De Gruyter, ISBN 978-3-11-021454-3
- Cahen, Claude (1973). "Frédegaire et les Turcs". In Économies et sociétés au Moyen Âge: mélanges offerts à Édouard Perroy. Paris, pp. 24–27.
- Chronopoulos, Tina (2010), "Brief Lives of Sidonius, Symmachus, and Fulgentius Written in Early Twelfth-Century England?", The Journal of Medieval Latin, 20: 232–291, JSTOR 45019649
- Goffart, Walter (1980), Barbarians and Romans, A.D. 418–584: The Techniques of Accommodation, Princeton University Press, ISBN 0-691-10231-7
- Grahn-Hoek, Heike (2009), "Das Recht der Thüringer und die Frage ihrer ethnischen Identität. Mit einer Bemerkung zur Entstehung von Begriff und Institution ‚Adel'", in Castritius, Helmut; Geuenich, Dieter; Werner, Matthias (eds.), Die Frühzeit der Thüringer, Reallexikon der Germanischen Altertumskunde - Ergänzungsbände, vol. 63, De Gruyter, pp. 415–456, doi:10.1515/9783110214949.415
- Haubrichs, Wolfgang (2009), "Der „Name" der Thüringer", in Castritius, Helmut; Geuenich, Dieter; Werner, Matthias (eds.), Die Frühzeit der Thüringer, Reallexikon der Germanischen Altertumskunde - Ergänzungsbände, vol. 63, De Gruyter, pp. 83–102, doi:10.1515/9783110214949.83
- Jordanes. The Origins and Deeds of the Goths. Charles C. Mierow, trans. Last modified 22 April 1997.
- Kim, Hyun Jin (2013). The Huns, Rome and the Birth of Europe. Cambridge University Press.
- Krautschick, Stefan (1986), "Zwei Aspekte des Jahres 476", Historia: Zeitschrift für Alte Geschichte (35): 344–371, JSTOR 4435971
- Maenchen-Helfen, Otto (1947). "Communications". The American Historical Review. 52 (4): 836–841. JSTOR 1842348.
- Martindale, John R., ed. (1980). The Prosopography of the Later Roman Empire: Volume II, AD 395–527. Cambridge: Cambridge University Press. ISBN 0-521-20159-4.
- Macbain, Bruce (1983), "Odovacer the Hun?", Classical Philology, 78 (4): 323–327, JSTOR 269961
- MacGeorge, Penny (2002), Late Roman Warlords, Oxford University Press, ISBN 0-19-925244-0
- Menges, Karl Heinrich (1995). The Turkic Languages and Peoples: An Introduction to Turkic Studies. Otto Harrassowitz Verlag. ISBN 3447035331.
- Meserve, Margaret (2008). Empires of Islam in Renaissance Historical Thought. Harvard University Press.
- Paul the Deacon (1907). Historia LangobardorumIV.xlii William Dudley Foulke, trans.
- Reynolds, Robert L.; Lopez, Robert S. (1946), "Odoacer: German or Hun?", The American Historical Review, 52 (1): 36–53, doi:10.1086/ahr/52.1.36, JSTOR 1845067
- Thompson, E. A. (1982). Romans and Barbarians: The Decline of the Western Empire. University of Wisconsin Press. ISBN 0-299-08700-X.
- Wolfram, Herwig (1990). History of the Goths. University of California Press. ISBN 0520069838.
- Wolfram, Herwig (1997). The Roman Empire and Its Germanic Peoples. University of California Press. ISBN 0520085116.
- Zeuss, Johann Kaspar (1837), Die Deutschen und die Nachbarstamme, Lentner
