= Rugiland =

Former monarchy in Europe

Kingdom of the Rugii Regnum Rugurum
- 467–487
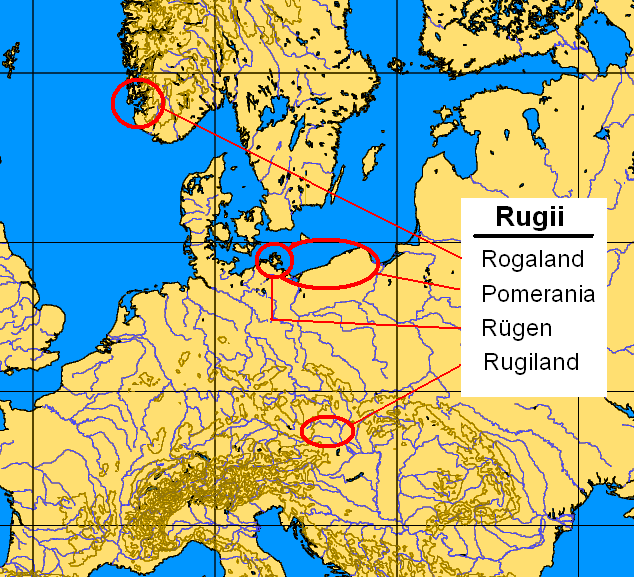
- Settlement areas of the Rugii: Rogaland, Pomerania (since 1st century), Rugiland (5th century); Rügen (uncertain)
- Capital: Vindobona
- Common languages: Latin; East Germanic
- Religion: Arianism
- Government: Monarchy
- King
  - 467-475: Flaccitheus
  - 475-487: Feletheus
- Historical era: Late antiquity
  - Flaccitheus established an independent Rugian kingdom following the Hunnic defeat at the Battle of Nedao: 467
  - the Rugian king Feletheus is defeated by King of Italy Odoacer: 487
Preceded by	Succeeded by
Hunnic Empire	Kingdom of Odoacer
- Today part of: Austria; Czech Republic; Germany

The Kingdom of the Rugii or Rugiland was established by the Germanic Rugii in present-day Austria in the 5th century.

== History ==
=== Background ===
The Rugii were an East Germanic tribe who probably migrated from southwest Norway to Pomerania in the 1st century. In the beginning of the 4th century, the Rugii moved southwards and settled at the upper Tisza in ancient Pannonia, in what is now modern Hungary. They were later attacked by the Huns, and they fought alongside Attila at the Battle of the Catalunian Plains in 451. In 453, they successfully rebelled against the Huns along with other Germanic tribes at the Battle of Nedao, after which they settled in the counties of Waldviertel and Weinviertel which lie north of the Danube. Nowadays these counties are part of Lower Austria but were never part of the Roman province of Noricum.

=== Kingdom ===
By 467, the Rugii ruled a kingdom based in Lower Austria under their king Flaccitheus. After his death in 475, Flaccitheus was succeeded by his son Feletheus, who was married to the Goth Gisa. In 476, Felethus supported the Herulian and Scirian mercenaries of Odoacer, who overthrew the Roman Emperor Romulus Augustus and made himself King of Italy. After the Eastern Roman Emperor Zeno attempted to create conflict between the Rugii and Odoacer, Feletheus killed his brother Ferderuchus, who supported Odoacer. Odoacer subsequently invaded the Kingdom of the Rugii, where he utterly defeated the Rugian troops and captured Feletheus and his wife, who were executed in Ravenna in 487. Their territory was subsequently settled by the Lombards. Two years later, the Rugii joined the Ostrogothic king Theodoric the Great, who invaded Italy and defeated Odoacer in 493.

== List of kings ==
- Flaccitheus (454–475)
- Feletheus (475–487)
- Frideric (487–492/493), claimant

== See also ==
- Rogaland
- Rügen

== Primary sources ==
- Eugippius: Vita Sancti Severini
- Paul the Deacon: History of the Lombards

== Secondary sources ==
- Pauly-Wissowa. Realencyclopädie der classischen Altertumswissenschaft (RE). Bd. 6,2. Stuttgart 1909, Sp. 2161f.
- Friedrich Lotter: Severinus von Noricum, Legende und historische Wirklichkeit: Untersuchungen zur Phase des Übergangs von spätantiken zu mittelalterlichen Denk- und Lebensformen. Stuttgart 1976.
- Martindale, John R.; Jones, A. H. M.; Morris, John, eds. (1971). The Prosopography of the Later Roman Empire: Volume I, AD 260–395. Cambridge: Cambridge University Press. ISBN 0-521-07233-6.
- Walter Pohl: Die Gepiden und die gentes an der mittleren Donau nach dem Zerfall des Attilareiches. In: Herwig Wolfram, Falko Daim (Hrsg.): Die Völker an der mittleren und unteren Donau im fünften und sechsten Jahrhundert. Wien 1980, S. 239ff.
