= Flaccitheus =

- King of the Rugii
- Reign: 467–475
- Predecessor: ?
- Successor: Feletheus
- Born: ?
- Died: 475
- Religion: Arianism

Flaccitheus (died c. 475) was the founder of the Kingdom of the Rugii.

== Biography ==
Little is known about Flaccitheus, but he is mentioned in the work Vita Sancti Severini by Eugippius. After the Battle of Nedao in 454, the Rugii had settled on the north bank of the Danube. During the subsequent breakdown of Roman order in Noricum, the Rugii had exploited the situation to consolidate their power. By 467, Flaccitheus had established the Kingdom of the Rugii. He was in frequent conflict with the Ostrogoths, and although an Arian Christian, a close confidant of Severinus of Noricum. Flaccitheus died probably around 475, after which he was succeeded by his son Feletheus.

== Primary sources ==
- Eugippius: Vita Sancti Severini

== Secondary sources ==
- Friedrich Lotter: Severinus von Noricum, Legende und historische Wirklichkeit: Untersuchungen zur Phase des Übergangs von spätantiken zu mittelalterlichen Denk- und Lebensformen. Stuttgart 1976.
- Martindale, John R., ed. (1980). The Prosopography of the Later Roman Empire: Volume II, AD 395–527. Cambridge: Cambridge University Press. p. 473. ISBN 0-521-20159-4.
- Walter Pohl: Die Gepiden und die gentes an der mittleren Donau nach dem Zerfall des Attilareiches. In: Herwig Wolfram, Falko Daim (Hrsg.): Die Völker an der mittleren und unteren Donau im fünften und sechsten Jahrhundert. Wien 1980, S. 239–305.
- Edward Arthur Thompson: Romans and Barbarians. Madison 1982, S. 113ff.
