= Kingdom of Odoacer =

Kingdom in 5th-century Italy

Kingdom of Italy Regnum Italiae
- 476–493
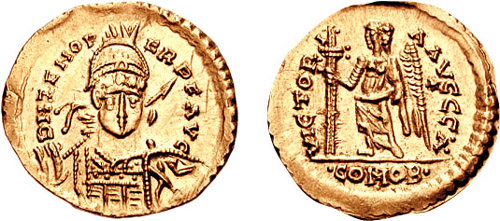
- Odoacer Solidus (coin)

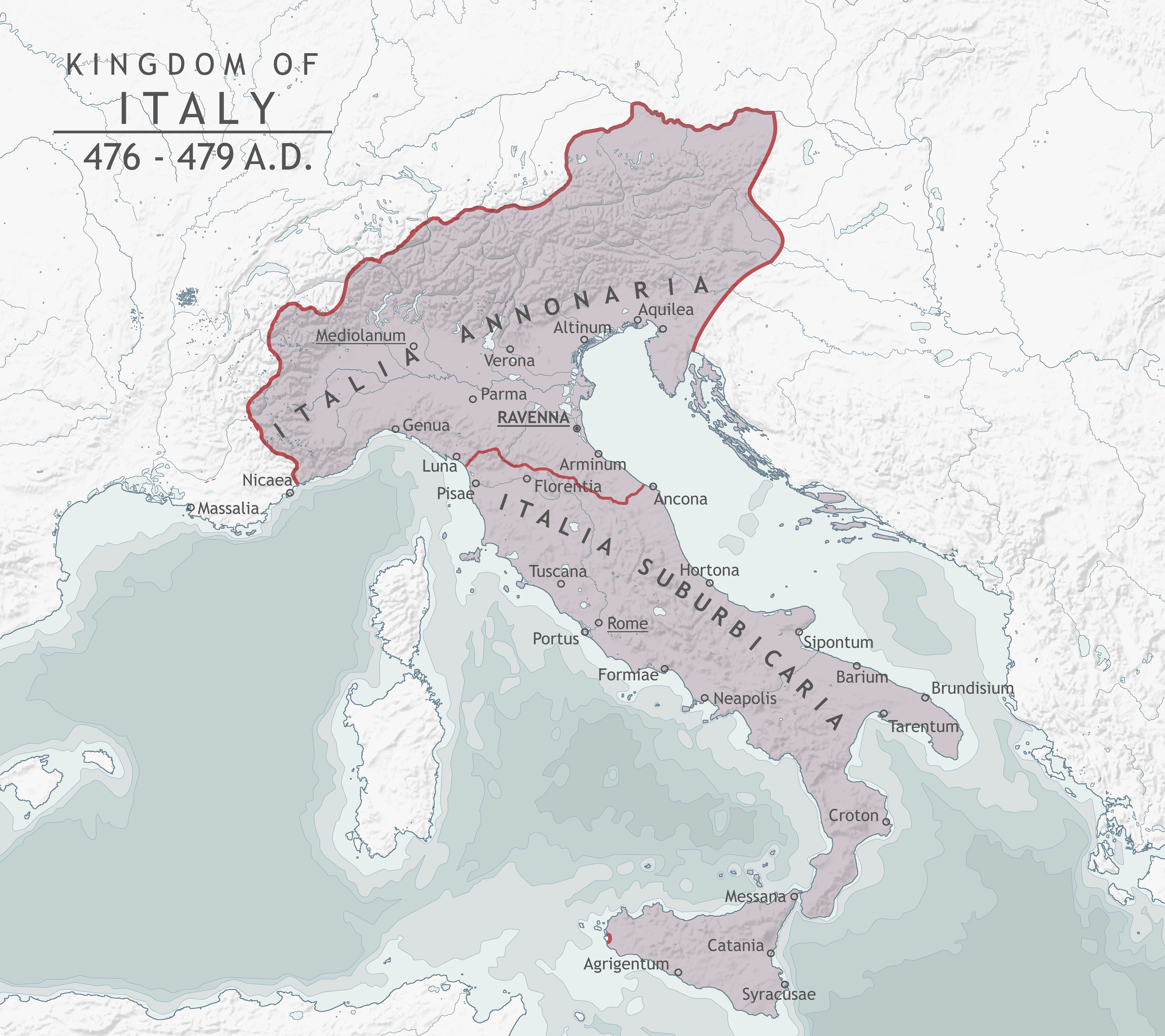
- Italy in 476
- Capital: Ravenna
- Largest city: Rome
- Common languages: Latin; Vulgar Latin; Greek; Gothic
- Religion: Chalcedonian Christianity (majority); Arian Christianity (amongst elite); Roman Paganism
- Government: Monarchy
- Dux
  - 476–493 AD: Odoacer
- Legislature: Roman Senate
- Historical era: Late Antiquity to Early Middle Ages
  - Odoacer is proclaimed Rex: 23 August 476
  - Romulus Augustulus abdicates: 4 September 476
  - Theodoric assassinates Odoacer: 15 March 493
- Currency: Solidus
Preceded by	Succeeded by
Western Roman Empire; Rugiland	Ostrogothic Kingdom

The Kingdom of Odoacer, officially known as the Kingdom of Italy (Latin: Regnum Italiae), was a barbarian kingdom (476–493) that was founded with the deposition of the last Western Roman emperor, Romulus Augustulus, at the Battle of Ravenna in 476. The battle resulted in the self-proclamation as Rex by Odoacer. The creation of the kingdom traditionally marks the end of the Western Roman Empire. Odoacer's kingdom lasted until the assassination of Odoacer by Theodoric the Great, after which he proclaimed himself king of Italy and began to reign over the Ostrogothic Kingdom.

== Odoacer's rule ==
In 476, Odoacer was proclaimed rex by his soldiers and dux Italiae by Emperor Zeno, initiating a new administrative era over Roman lands. He introduced a few important changes to the administrative system of Italy. At the beginning of his reign, he slew Count Bracila at Ravenna that he might inspire a fear of himself among the Romans. Although Odoacer ruled Italy, he styled himself as a client of the Eastern emperor Zeno. He was addressed by two titles, first as king (Latin: Rex) and second as duce (Latin: Dux), the latter title granted by Zeno. In the sole surviving document from his chancery and by the consul Basilius, Odoacer used the title of king. Odoacer's rule over the kingdom was managed with the resumption of activities of the Roman Senate. Under the Kingdom, freedom of religion was granted to Pagans and Christians.

Odoacer took many military actions to strengthen his control over Italy and its neighboring areas. He achieved a solid diplomatic coup by inducing the Vandal king Gaiseric to cede Sicily to him. Noting that Odoacar seized power in August 476, Gaiseric died in January 477, and the sea usually became closed to navigation around the beginning of November. This cession is dated by Cloves to September or October 476. When Julius Nepos was murdered by two of his retainers in his country house near Salona (9 May 480), Odoacer assumed the duty of pursuing and executing the assassins, and at the same time, established his own rule in Dalmatia.

== History ==
In 476, Odoacer was proclaimed rex by his soldiers and dux Italiae by emperor Zeno. Odoacer introduced a few important changes to the administrative system of Italy. According to Jordanes, at the beginning of his reign, he "slew Count Bracila at Ravenna that he might inspire a fear of himself among the Romans." He took many military actions to strengthen his control over Italy and its neighbouring areas. He achieved a solid diplomatic coup by inducing the Vandal king Gaiseric to cede Sicily to him. Noting that "Odoacar seized power in August of 476, Gaiseric died in January 477, and the sea usually became closed to navigation around the beginning of November", F. M. Clover dates this cession to September or October 476. When Julius Nepos was murdered by two of his retainers in his country house near Salona (9 May 480), Odoacer assumed the duty of pursuing and executing the assassins, and at the same time established his own rule in Dalmatia.

As Bury points out, "It is highly important to observe that Odoacar established his political power with the co-operation of the Roman Senate, and this body seems to have given him their loyal support throughout his reign, so far as our meagre sources permit us to draw inferences." He regularly nominated members of the Senate to the Consulate and other prestigious offices: "Basilius, Decius, Venantius, and Manlius Boethius held the consulship and were either Prefects of Rome or Praetorian Prefects; Symmachus and Sividius were consuls and Prefects of Rome; another senator of old family, Cassiodorus, was appointed a minister of finance." A. H. M. Jones also notes that under Odoacer the Senate acquired "enhanced prestige and influence" in order to counter any desires for restoration of Imperial rule. As the most tangible example of this renewed prestige, for the first time since the mid-3rd century, copper coins were issued with the legend S(enatus) C(onsulto). Jones describes these coins as "fine big copper pieces", which were "a great improvement on the miserable little nummi hitherto current", and not only were they copied by the Vandals in Africa, but they formed the basis of the currency reform by Anastasius in the Eastern Empire.

In 487/488, Odoacer led his army to victory against the Rugians in Noricum, taking their king Feletheus into captivity; when word that Feletheus's son, Fredericus, had returned to his people, Odoacer sent his brother Onoulphus with an army back to Noricum against him. Onoulphus found it necessary to evacuate the remaining Romans and resettled them in Italy. The remaining Rugians fled and took refuge with the Ostrogoths. The resulting abandoned province was settled by the Lombards by 493.

=== Fall to the Ostrogoths ===
The kingdom was de jure part of the Roman Empire reunified under Zeno, since Odoacer swore allegiance to the emperor in exchange for the titles of patrician and ruler of the prefecture of Italy. However, they remained effectively separate and the relations between Odoacer and Zeno deteriorated rapidly. Odoacer's support of the rebel Illus resulted in emperor Zeno allying himself with the Ostrogoth Theodoric. In 488, the Eastern Roman emperor Zeno authorized Ostrogoth king Theodoric to take Italy. The Ostrogoths penetrated Odoacer's defenses and reached Ravenna in 490. After a three-year siege, Theodoric and Odoacer agreed to share power. On March 15, 493, both celebrated their agreement with a banquet of reconciliation in Ravenna, at which Theodoric's men turned on him and murdered Odoacer, with Theodoric personally cutting Odoacer in half. Odoacer's supporters were killed and his lands were absorbed into the new Ostrogothic Kingdom.

== Bibliography ==
- Amory, Patrick (1997). People and Identity in Ostrogothic Italy, 489–554. Cambridge; New York: Cambridge University Press. ISBN 978-0-51152-306-9.
- Bury, J.B. (1923). History of the Later Roman Empire: From the Death of Theodosius I to the Death of Justinian. Vol. I. New York: Macmillan. OCLC 963903029.
- Clover, Frank M. (1999). "A Game of Bluff: The Fate of Sicily after A.D. 476". Historia: Zeitschrift für Alte Geschichte. 48 (1): 235–244. JSTOR 4436542.
- Jones, A.H.M. (1986) [1st pub. 1964]. "The Fall of the Western Empire and the Barbarian Kingdoms". The Later Roman Empire, 284–602: A Social, Economic, and Administrative Survey. Vol. I. Baltimore, MD: Johns Hopkins University Press. ISBN 0801832845.
- Jordanes (1915). The Gothic History of Jordanes. Translated by Charles C. Mierow. London: Oxford University Press. OCLC 463056290.
- Martindale, J.R. (1980). "Odoacer". Prosopography of the Later Roman Empire. Vol. 2 (A.D. 395–527). London; New York: Cambridge University Press. pp. 791–793. ISBN 0-521-20159-4.
- Halsall, Guy (December 2007). Barbarian Migrations and the Roman West. Cambridge Medieval Textbooks. pp. 376–568.
- Paul the Deacon (2003). History of the Lombards. Translated by William Dudley Foulke. Philadelphia: University of Pennsylvania Press. ISBN 0-8122-1079-4.
