= 489th =

489th may refer to:

- 489th Bombardment Group, inactive United States Army Air Force unit
- 489th Bombardment Squadron, active United States Air Force unit

== See also ==
- 489 (number)
- 489, the year 489 (CDLXXXIX) of the Julian calendar
- 489 BC
