= Onoulphus =

Onoulphus, also Onoulf, Unulf and Hunulf (died 493), was a military leader in the 5th century. His origins lay in the non-Roman tribal groups led by Attila the Hun (died 453) in the Middle Danube region, but his career as a soldier brought him into the violent internal politics of the Roman empire during the period when the last Western Roman emperors lived and died.

Together with his father Edeka, he was first mentioned as a chief of an independent Sciri polity, which was crushed by the Ostrogoths in 468/9. By 477 he was serving in the Eastern Roman Empire as magister militum per Illyricum, under the command of Armatus, who he killed in about that year on the instructions of the emperor Zeno. He finally became a general under the command of his own brother Odoacer, who in 476 led the non-Roman soldiers under his command to a takeover of Roman Italy. He and his brother were killed in 493 when Theoderic the Great and his Ostrogothic forces took control of Roman Italy.

== Biography ==
According to an entry in the Suda, Onoulphus was a Scirian on his mother's side and a "Thuringian" on his father's side, and his brother Odoacer would have shared at least in their father's Thuringian heritage. Scholars consider that at least in this record the "Thuringi" must be equivalent to the Turcilingi, who were a non-Roman people whose soldiers were led by Odoacer as "king" in the Italian military. (There is no consensus among scholars about whether the Turcilingi and Thuringi can be more generally equated.)

In 448/9 the father of Onoulphus and Odoacer, Edeco, was one of the most trusted military chiefs at the court of Attila, King of the Huns.

After the death of Attila in 453, Edeka and Onoulphus were mentioned as the two chiefs of the "remnants of the Scirii", after they were devastatingly defeated in battle by the Ostrogoths. As part of a bigger alliance they subsequently fought the Ostrogoths a second time at the Battle of Bolia in 468/9, and were again defeated by the Ostrogoths under their new king Theodemir.

Onoulphus joined the Roman army in the 470s and rose through its ranks. He found a protector in the general Armatus, who had him appointed first comes and in 477, magister militum per Illyricum, commander in chief of the Balkan army. In that same year, by order of the Emperor Zeno, Onoulphus killed Armatus, despite his having greatly benefited by the latter's protection (sources state that Armatus lent him a huge sum to pay for a banquet).

Onoulphus kept his office until 479, when he fell out of favour. He then found refuge with his brother Odoacer, who by then had become king of Italy. One of the duties he carried out for his brother was a campaign against Fredericus, who had succeeded his father Feletheus as king of the Rugians. Onoulphus found it necessary to evacuate the remaining Romans and resettled them in Italy. The remaining Rugians fled and took refuge with the Ostrogoths; the abandoned province was settled by the Lombards by 493.

He remained loyal to Odoacer during his brother's war for survival against Theodoric the Great, king of the Ostrogoths, standing with him during the siege of Ravenna. After Odoacer's death, Onoulphus was killed by archers while seeking refuge in a church.

== Connection between Onoulphus, Odoacer and Armatus ==
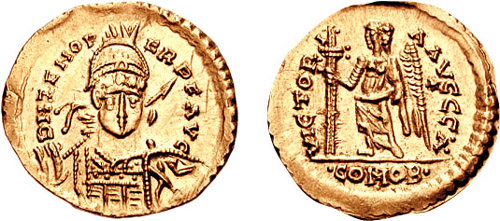
Solidus minted by Odoacer, chieftain of the Heruli and later King of Italy, in the name of the Eastern Emperor Zeno

A 1986 publication by Stephan Krautschick advanced the hypothesis that Armatus and his cousin and emperor Basiliscus were related by blood with the chieftain of the Heruli and later King of Italy Odoacer. According to this hypothesis, supported by several scholars, Armatus was the brother of Onoulphus and Odoacer, who, therefore, was the nephew of Emperor Basiliscus and of his sister, the Empress Verina, wife of Emperor Leo I. This hypothesis explains why Armatus generously helped Onoulphus in his career, and states that he was killed by his own brother.

According to this proposal, the connection between Armatus, Odoacer and Onoulphus is given by a fragment in the chronicle of John of Antioch, in which Onoulphus is said to be the killer and the brother of Armatus. Before Krautschick's hypothesis, and still today for scholars who reject this identification, John's passage was corrected to read "Odoacer was the brother of that Onoulphus who killed Armatus": this correction makes the statement compatible with those of the contemporary historians, as neither John Malalas nor Malchus tell about the relationship between Odoacer and Basiliscus or the killing of Armatus by his own brother.

== Bibliography ==
- Armory, Patrick (1997). People and Identity in Ostrogothic Italy, 489–554. Cambridge University Press. pp. 282–283. ISBN 0-521-52635-3.
- Alexander Demandt, Die Spätantike: römische Geschichte von Diocletian bis Justinian 284–565 n. Chr., 1989, Munchen, p. 178.
- Krautschick, Stephan, "Zwei Aspekte des Jahres 476", Historia, 35, 1986, pp. 344–371.
- MacGeorge, Penny (2003). Late Roman Warlords. Oxford University Press. pp. 284–285. ISBN 0-19-925244-0.
- Martindale, John R., ed. (1980). The Prosopography of the Later Roman Empire: Volume II, AD 395–527. Cambridge: Cambridge University Press. ISBN 0-521-20159-4.
- Rohrbacher, David, The Historians of Late Antiquity, Routledge, 2002, ISBN 0-415-20458-5, pp. 82–92.
