= Battle of Faenza (disambiguation) =

The Battle of Faenza was a 1797 battle fought between the French First Republic and the Papal States.

Battle of Faenza may also refer to:

- Battle of Faventia (82 BC), fought between opposing Roman factions
- Battle of Faenza (490), fought between the Kingdom of Italy and the Ostrogoths
- Battle of Faventia (542), fought between the Ostrogoths and the Byzantine Empire
- Siege of Faenza (1239), led by Emperor Frederick II against the Guelph–controlled city
