= Anthony the Hermit =

Early anchorite and saint

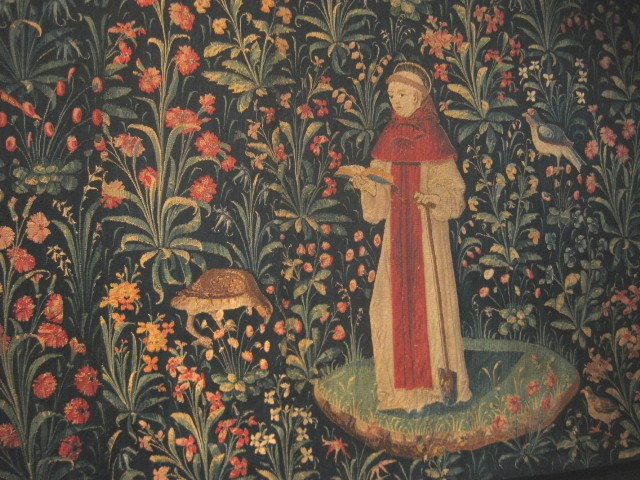
- Born: c. 468; Pannonia Valeria, Hunnic Empire
- Died: c. 520; Lérins Abbey
- Canonized: Pre-Congregation
- Feast: 28 December

Anthony the Hermit (c. 468 – c. 520), also known as Anthony of Lérins, was an anchorite. He was born in the ancient Roman province of Pannonia Valeria (now Hungary), then part of the Hunnic Empire. He is venerated as a saint in the Eastern Orthodox Church and the Roman Catholic Church.

== Life ==
When Anthony was eight years old, his father died and he was entrusted to the care of the abbot Severinus of Noricum, in modern-day Austria. Upon the death of Severinus in 482, Anthony was sent to Germany and put in the care of his uncle, Constantius, an early bishop of Lorsch. While there, Anthony is thought to have become a monk at the age of twenty.

In 488, at about 20 years of age, Anthony moved to Italy to take up an eremitical life with a small group of hermits living on the shores of Lake Como, near the site of Saint Fidelis's martyrdom, where he was joined by numerous disciples seeking to emulate his holiness. He lived there until two years before his death, seeking greater solitude, he became a monk at the Abbey of Lérins, where he became well known locally for the holiness of his life and the miracles he had performed.

Anthony is commemorated on 28 December in the Roman Martyrology, and also in the Eastern Orthodox Church. He is the patron of hermits and miracle-seekers.
