= Battle of Isonzo (489) =

Part of the Roman-Germanic wars

Coordinates: 45°46′11.01″N 13°22′16.29″E

- Part of the Roman-Germanic wars
Date	28 August 489 AD
Location	Isonzo, near Aquileia, modern Italy
Result	Ostrogothic victory

Belligerents
Heruls; Scirians	Ostrogoths; Rugians

Commanders and leaders
Odoacer	Theodoric the Great

Strength
20,000	10,000

Casualties and losses
Unknown	Unknown

The Battle of the Isonzo, the Battle of the Aesontius, or the Battle of the Isontius, is the name given to the battle fought on August 28, 489, on the banks of the Isontius River, not far away from Aquileia. This river is now known as the Isonzo in Italian, and Soča in Slovene.

Theodoric the Great, king of the Ostrogoths, in 489 opened his first campaign against Odoacer to wrest Italy from him. On 28 August, the two armies met on the banks of the Isontius. Theodoric defeated Odoacer, who retreated. A second battle was fought at Verona.

== Background ==
In 476, the barbarian warlord Odoacer founded the Kingdom of Italy as the first King of Italy and initiated a new era over Roman lands. Unlike most of the last emperors, he acted decisively. At the beginning of his reign, he "slew Count Bracila at Ravenna that he might inspire a fear of himself among the Romans." He took many military actions to strengthen his control over Italy and its neighboring areas. He achieved a solid diplomatic coup by inducing the Vandal King Gaiseric to cede to him Sicily.

Noting that "Odovacar seized power in August of 476, Gaiseric died in January 477, and the sea usually became closed to navigation around the beginning of November", F. M. Clover dates that cession to September or October 476. When Julius Nepos was murdered by two of his retainers in his country house near Salona (May 480), Odoacer assumed the duty of pursuing and executing the assassins and at the same time established his own rule in Dalmatia.

As Odoacer's position improved, Zeno, the Eastern Emperor, increasingly saw him as a rival. According to John of Antioch, Odoacer exchanged messages with Illus, who had been in revolt against Zeno since 484. Thus, Zeno sought to destroy Odoacer and promised Theodoric the Great and his Ostrogoths the Italian Peninsula if they were to defeat and remove Odoacer.

Theodoric had his own reasons to agree to that offer, as he had enough experience to know (or at least suspect) that Zeno would not, in the long term, tolerate his independent power. When Theodoric rebelled in 485, he had in mind Zeno's treatment of Armatus. Armatus defected from Basiliscus to Zeno in 476 and was made senior imperial general for life. Within a year, Zeno had him assassinated.

== Battle and aftermath ==
In 489, Theodoric led the Ostrogoths across the Julian Alps and into Italy. On 28 August, Odoacer met him at the Isonzo, only to be defeated. He withdrew to Verona, reaching its outskirts on 27 September, where he immediately set up a fortified camp. Theodoric followed him and three days later defeated him again. While Odoacer took refuge in Ravenna, Theodoric continued across Italy to Mediolanum, where the majority of Odoacer's army, including his chief general, Tufa, surrendered to the Ostrogothic king.

Theodoric had no reason to doubt Tufa's loyalty and dispatched his new general to Ravenna with a band of elite soldiers, "but Tufa changed sides, the Gothic elite force entrusted to his command was destroyed, and Theodoric suffered his first serious defeat on Italian soil." Theodoric recoiled by seeking safety in Ticinum. Odoacer emerged from Ravenna and started to besiege his rival. While both were fully engaged, the Burgundians seized the opportunity to plunder and devastated Liguria. Many Romans were taken into captivity and did not regain their freedom until Theodoric ransomed them three years later.
