= Siege of Ravenna (490–493) =

490–493 siege warfare between Ostrogoths and Herules Odoacer

- Part of the Roman-Germanic wars
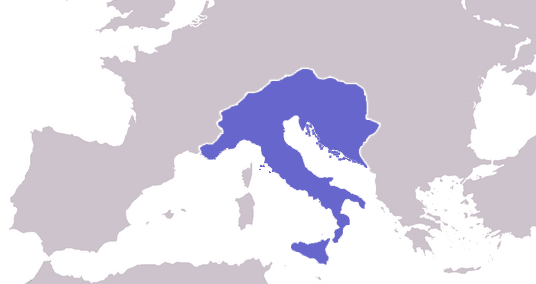
- Ostrogothic Kingdom
| Date | Late 490 – 5 March 493 CE |
| Location | Ravenna |
| Result | Ostrogothic victory |

Belligerents
| Ostrogoths; Rugii | Heruls; Scirians |

Commanders and leaders
| Theodoric the Great | Odoacer (executed) |

Strength
| Unknown | Unknown |

Casualties and losses
| Unknown | Unknown |

The siege of Ravenna was a military engagement from 490–493, when Theodoric besieged Odoacer in Ravenna. The siege ended when the two men agreed to peace, but on 15 March 493 CE, Theodoric murdered Odoacer during a banquet.
