= Feletheus =

- King of the Rugii
- Reign: 475–487
- Predecessor: Flaccitheus
- Successor: office abolished
- Born: ?
- Died: 487; Ravenna
- Spouse: Gisa
- Issue: Frideric
- Father: Flaccitheus
- Religion: Arianism

Feletheus (also known as Feva, Feba, Foeba, Fevva, Fevvanus, Theuvanus; died 487) was the king of the Rugii from 475 to 487.

== Biography ==
Feletheus was the son of Flaccitheus, king of the Rugii and founder of the Kingdom of the Rugii. His brother was Ferderuchus. Feletheus was married to the Goth Gisa, who was probably the cousin of the Amal Ostrogothic king Theodoric the Great. After the death of his father, probably in 475, Feletheus succeeded his father as king of the Rugii. Their territory at the time was based in Lower Austria. In 476, Feletheus supported Odoacer and his Scirian and Herulian allies in the overthrow of the Roman Emperor Romulus Augustus. Feletheus was a close confidant of Severinus of Noricum. After the Eastern Roman Emperor Zeno attempted to create conflict between the Rugii and Odoacer, Feletheus executed his nephew Fredericus, who supported Odoacer. Odoacer subsequently invaded the Kingdom of the Rugii, utterly defeating them at a battle near present-day Vienna. Feletheus and his wife were captured, and executed in Ravenna in 487. Two years later, under his son Frideric, the Rugii joined the Ostrogothic king Theodoric the Great, who invaded Italy and defeated and murdered Odoacer in 493.

== Primary sources ==
- Eugippius: Vita Sancti Severini
- Paul the Deacon: History of the Lombards

== Secondary sources ==
- Pauly-Wissowa. Realencyclopädie der Classischen Altertumswissenschaft (RE). Bd. 6,2. Stuttgart 1909, Sp. 2161f.
- Friedrich Lotter: Severinus von Noricum, Legende und historische Wirklichkeit: Untersuchungen zur Phase des Übergangs von spätantiken zu mittelalterlichen Denk- und Lebensformen. Stuttgart 1976.
- Martindale, John R.; Jones, A. H. M.; Morris, John, eds. (1971). The Prosopography of the Later Roman Empire: Volume I, AD 260–395. Cambridge: Cambridge University Press. ISBN 0-521-07233-6.
- Walter Pohl: Die Gepiden und die gentes an der mittleren Donau nach dem Zerfall des Attilareiches. In: Herwig Wolfram, Falko Daim (Hrsg.): Die Völker an der mittleren und unteren Donau im fünften und sechsten Jahrhundert. Wien 1980, S. 239ff.
