= 489 BC =

489 BC in various calendars
- Gregorian calendar: 489 BC; CDLXXXIX BC
- Ab urbe condita: 265
- Ancient Egypt era: XXVII dynasty, 37
- Pharaoh: Darius I of Persia, 33
- Ancient Greek Olympiad (summer): 72nd Olympiad, year 4
- Assyrian calendar: 4262
- Balinese saka calendar: N/A
- Bengali calendar: −1082 – −1081
- Berber calendar: 462
- Buddhist calendar: 56
- Burmese calendar: −1126
- Byzantine calendar: 5020–5021
- Chinese calendar: 辛亥年 (Metal Pig); 2209 or 2002 — to — 壬子年 (Water Rat); 2210 or 2003
- Coptic calendar: −772 – −771
- Discordian calendar: 678
- Ethiopian calendar: −496 – −495
- Hebrew calendar: 3272–3273
- Hindu calendars
- Vikram Samvat: −432 – −431
- Shaka Samvat: N/A
- Kali Yuga: 2612–2613
- Holocene calendar: 9512
- Iranian calendar: 1110 BP – 1109 BP
- Islamic calendar: 1144 BH – 1143 BH
- Javanese calendar: N/A
- Julian calendar: N/A
- Korean calendar: 1845
- Minguo calendar: 2400 before ROC 民前2400年
- Nanakshahi calendar: −1956
- Thai solar calendar: 54–55
- Tibetan calendar: ལྕགས་མོ་ཕག་ལོ་ (female Iron-Boar) −362 or −743 or −1515 — to — ཆུ་ཕོ་བྱི་བ་ལོ་ (male Water-Rat) −361 or −742 or −1514

Year 489 BC was a year of the pre-Julian Roman calendar. At the time, it was known as the Year of the Consulship of Iullus and Rufus (or, less frequently, year 265 Ab urbe condita). The denomination 489 BC for this year has been used since the early medieval period, when the Anno Domini calendar era became the prevalent method in Europe for naming years.

== Events ==
=== By place ===
==== Greece ====
- After his great victory in the Battle of Marathon, Miltiades leads a naval expedition to Paros to pay off a private score. However, the expedition is unsuccessful and, on his return, he is fined in a prosecution led by Xanthippus and put in prison where he dies of wounds received at Paros.
- The Athenian soldier and statesman, Aristides (the Just), is made chief archon of Athens.

== Deaths ==
- Cleomenes I, king of Sparta (approximate date)
- Miltiades, Athenian general (b. c. 550 BC)
