= Tufa (general) =

Tufa (d. 492/493) was a Germanic warrior active in 5th century Italy.

== Life ==
The name Tufa is East Germanic, and it is possible that he was Rugian. He was a follower of the Germanic warrior Odoacer, who in 476 proclaimed himself King of Italy.

Tufa was the commander-in-chief of the army of Odoacer's Kingdom of Italy when the Ostrogothic king Theodoric the Great invaded the country in 489. Tufa quickly deserted to Theodoric, along with large numbers of Odoacer's army. Tufa acquired Theodoric's confidence, and was dispatched to Ravenna with a band of elite troops in the hope that the city would surrender to Theodoric without battle. Upon arrival in Ravenna, however, Tufa again changed sides, and the elite Gothic soldiers entrusted to him were killed. This was considered Theodoric's first defeat in Italy.

In 490, after Odoacer had been defeated in battle by Theodoric and retreated to Ravenna, Tufa held his ground in the strategically important valley of Adige near Trento. In the fall of 491, Frideric, leader of the Rugii and an ally of Theodoric, defected to Tufa, after being criticized by Theodoric for his treatment of Roman civilians. Tufa and Frideric however quickly fell out with each other, and in 492, or perhaps 493, battled each other somewhere between Trento and Verona. Tufa, and probably also Frideric, died in this battle, after which the Rugii again joined Theodoric.

== Sources ==
- Wolfram, Herwig (1990). History of the Goths. University of California Press. ISBN 0520069838.
- Martindale, John R., ed. (1980). The Prosopography of the Later Roman Empire: Volume II, AD 395–527. Cambridge: Cambridge University Press. ISBN 0-521-20159-4.
