= Frideric =

Leader of the Rugii

Frideric (Latin: Fredericus; d. 492/493) was the leader of the Germanic Rugians from 487 to 492/493.

== Life ==
Frideric was a son of the Rugian king Feletheus. In late 487, Odoacer, the King of Italy, invaded the Rugian kingdom and destroyed it. Frideric's father and his mother, the Ostrogothic princess Gisa, were captured and executed in Italy. Frideric was able to escape and gather the remaining Rugian survivors. In 488 he attempted to reconquer their traditional kingdom, but was defeated by Odoacer's brother Hunulf.

After attempts to recapture their territory failed, Frideric and his followers sought help from Theodoric the Great, king of the Ostrogoths, marching downstream along the Danube to Novae, near Svishtov, for the purpose. They encountered no opposition along the way, which implies that the Eastern Roman Empire may have arranged everything beforehand. In 489, shortly after the arrival of Frideric, Theodoric was appointed ruler of Italy by the Eastern Roman emperor Zeno.

After having accompanied Theodoric into Italy, Frideric and the Rugians were responsible for protecting Pavia. There they treated the Roman population harshly, for which Frideric was reprimanded by Theodoric. In August 491, Theodoric personally intervened in Pavia, which caused Frideric to defect from Theodoric to Odoacer's general Tufa. Frideric and Tufa however soon fell out with each other, and in 492, or perhaps 493, the two fought a battle somewhere between Verona and Trento. Tufa, and probably also Frideric, were killed in this battle. The Rugians thereafter joined Theodoric.

== Sources ==
- Wolfram, Herwig (1990). History of the Goths. University of California Press. pp. 278–282. ISBN 0520069838.
- Martindale, John R., ed. (1980). The Prosopography of the Later Roman Empire: Volume II, AD 395–527. Cambridge: Cambridge University Press. ISBN 0-521-20159-4.
