= Severinus of Noricum =

Italian Roman Catholic saint

Saint Severinus of Noricum
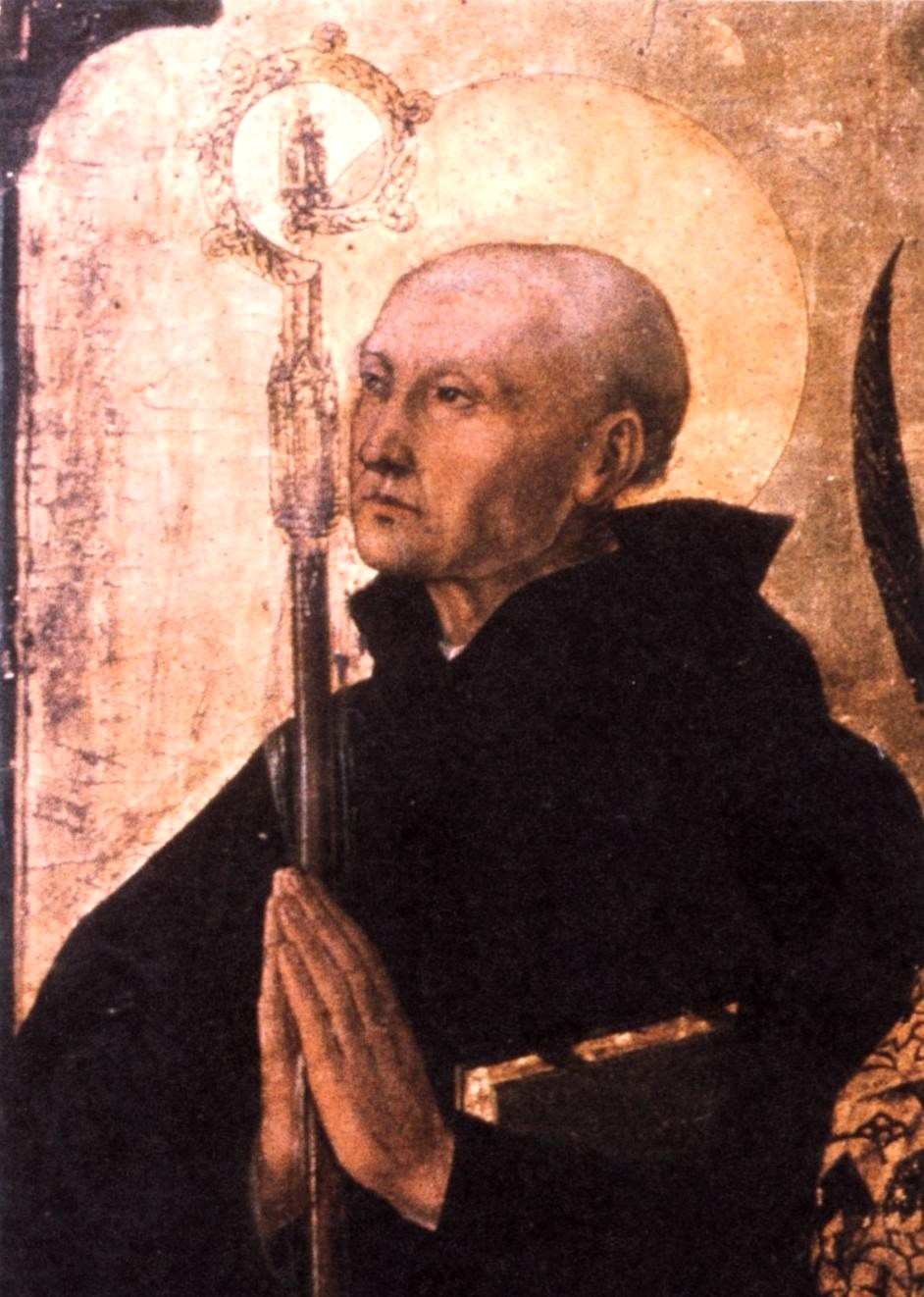
- Severin von Noricum (c. 1470)

Apostle to Noricum
- Born: c. 410; Southern Italy or Africa, Western Roman Empire
- Died: 8 January 482; Favianae, Noricum, Kingdom of Odoacer (today by Mautern an der Donau)
- Venerated in: Roman Catholic Church; Orthodox Church
- Feast: 8 January

Severinus of Noricum (c. 410 – 8 January 482) is a saint, known as the "Apostle to Noricum". It has been speculated that he was born in either Southern Italy or in the Roman province of Africa. Severinus himself refused to discuss his personal history before his appearance along the Danube in Noricum, after the death of Attila in 453. However, he did mention experiences with eastern desert monasticism, and his vita draws connections between Severinus and Saint Anthony of Lerins.

Saint Severinus of Noricum is not to be confused with Severinus of Septempeda, bishop of San Severino Marche and brother of Saint Victorinus of Camerino.

According to Thompson, the saint had been a public figure of the utmost importance and held the consulship himself in 461.

== Life ==
Little is known of Severinus's origins. The source for information about him is the Commemoratorium vitae s. Severini (511) by Eugippius.

Severinus was a high-born Roman living as an anchorite in the East. He himself was an ascetic in practice. He is first recorded as traveling along the Danube in Noricum and Bavaria, preaching Christianity, procuring supplies for the starving, redeeming captives and establishing monasteries at Passau and Favianae. At the age of eight, the orphaned Anthony of Lerins was entrusted to the care of Severinus and brought up at the monastery. Upon the death of Severinus in 482, he was sent to Germany and put in the care of his uncle, Constantius, an early Bishop of Lorsch.

While the Western Empire was falling apart, Severinus, thanks to his virtues and organizational skills, committed himself to the religious and material care of the frontier peoples, also taking care of their military defense. He organized refugee camps, migrations to safer areas, and food distribution.

Severinus's efforts seem to have won him wide respect, including that of the Germanic chieftain Odoacer. Eugippius credits him with the prediction that Odoacer would become king of Rome. However, Severinus warned that Odoacer would rule not more than fourteen years. According to Eugippius, Gibuld of the Alamanni used to harry Passau, until he was asked by Severinus to free his Roman hostages. Gibuld was so impressed by the Christian abbot that he agreed to free seventy of his prisoners.

Severinus also supposedly prophesied the destruction of Asturis (perhaps Klosterneuburg), Austria, by the Huns. When the people would not heed his warning, he took refuge in Comagena.

Severinus established refugee centers for people displaced by the invasion, and founded monasteries to re-establish spirituality and preserve learning in the stricken region.

He died in his monastic cell at Favianae while singing Psalm 150. Six years after his death, his monks were driven from their abbey, and his body was taken to Italy, where it was at first kept in the Castel dell'Ovo, Naples, then eventually entombed at the Benedictine monastery rededicated to him, the Abbey of San Severino in the city of Naples.

Severinus is the patron saint of Austria, and of Bavaria.

== Accounts of his life ==
Paul the Deacon, in his 8th-century History of the Lombards, mentions the monastery founded by Severinus at Eiferingen, at the foot of the Kahlenberg, not far from Vienna:

In these territories of the Noricans at that time was the monastery of the blessed Severinus, who, endowed with the sanctity of every abstinence, was already renowned for his many virtues, and though he dwelt in these places up to the end of his life: now however, Neapolis keeps his remains.

The Vita of Severinus was written by Eugippius. Beyond Eugippius's work, the only other contemporary source that mentions Saint Severinus is the Vita beati Antonii by Magnus Felix Ennodius, bishop of Pavia.

In the History of the Decline and Fall of the Roman Empire, Edward Gibbon notes that the disciples of Saint Severinus were invited by a Neapolitan lady to bring his body to the villa in 488, "in the place of Augustulus, who was probably no more". It is based on the passage in the Vita by Eugippius where it is said that the estate was called castellum Lucullanum. The estate was converted into a monastery before 500 to hold the saint's remains and Eugippius became an abbot there. The estate is also well attested as the place of exile of the deposed emperor Romulus Augustulus. Hence, the speculation that the Neapolitan woman Barbaria who received the relics in Castellum Lucullanum might have been Augustulus's mother.

Martin Luther made reference to St. Severinus in point 29 of his Ninety-five Theses suggesting that it is unclear whether all of the souls in purgatory desire to be redeemed, as it is said not to have been the case, for example, with Saints Severinus and Paschalis.

== See also ==
- Boethius
