= Battle of Verona (489) =

Battle in 489 CE

Date	30 September 489 CE
Location	Verona, modern Italy
Result	Ostrogothic victory

Belligerents
Heruls; Scirians	Ostrogoths; Rugians

Commanders and leaders
Odoacer	Theodoric the Great

Strength
20,000–25,000	20,000

Casualties and losses
Unknown	Unknown

The Battle of Verona was fought on 30 September 489 between the Ostrogothic leader Theodoric the Great and the king of Italy, Odoacer. Theodoric personally led his troops in battle, and achieved a decisive victory. Odoacer was subsequently forced to flee to Ravenna, and Theodoric was free to capture Pavia and Milan.
