= Odoacer =

Ruler of Italy (c. 433 – 493)

- Patricius; Dux; Rex
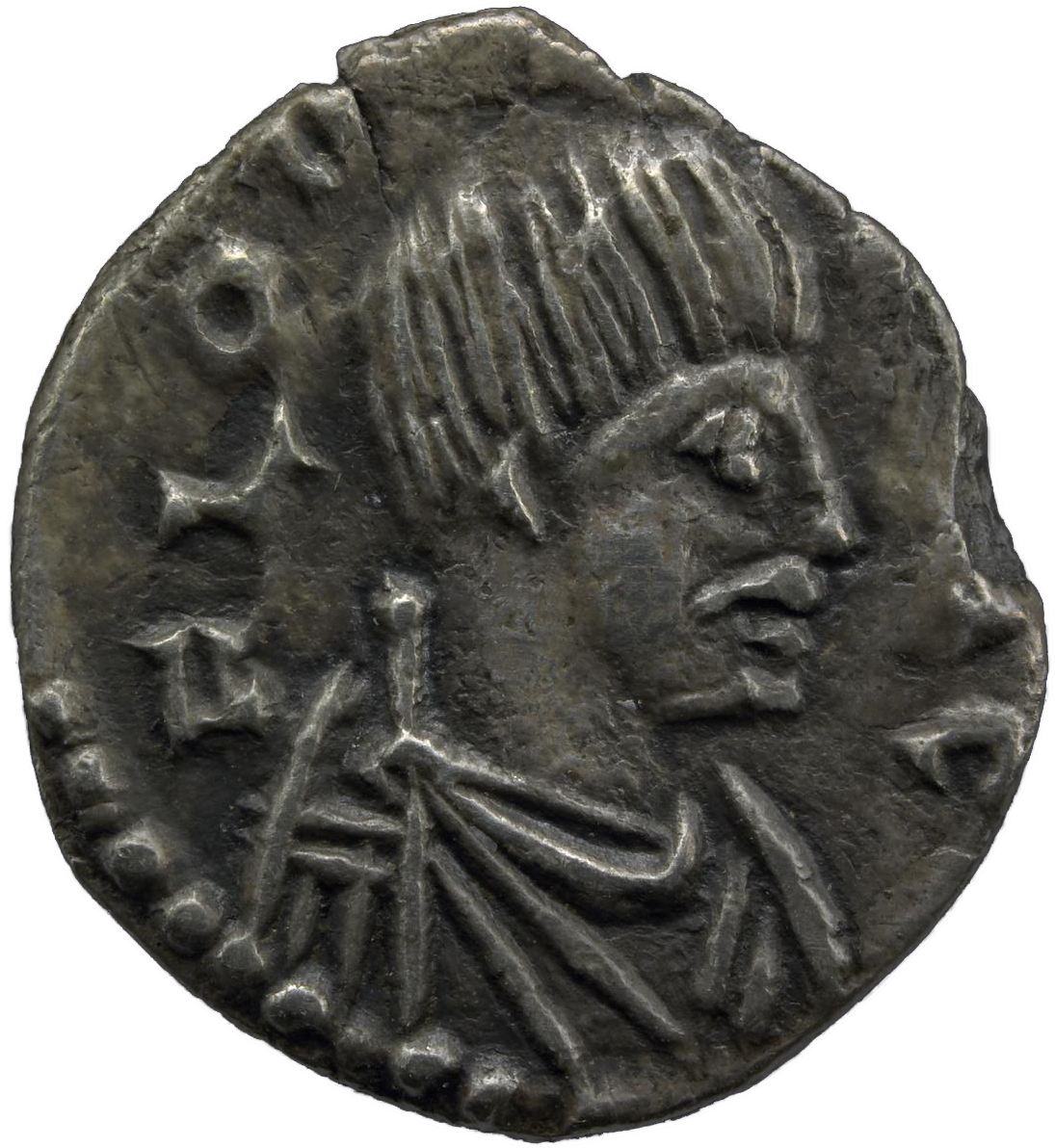
- Coin of Odoacer minted in Ravenna, 477, with Odoacer in profile, depicted with a "barbarian" moustache

King of Italy
- Reign: 4 September 476 – 15 March 493
- Successor: Theodoric the Great
- Born: c. 433
- Died: 15 March 493 (aged about 60); Ravenna, Kingdom of Italy
- Spouse: Sunigilda
- Issue: Thela
- Father: Edeko
- Religion: Arian Christianity

Odoacer (Note: /ˌoʊdoʊˈeɪsər/ OH-doh-AY-sər; Ancient Greek: Ὀδόακρος, romanized: Odóakros.) (c. 433 – 15 March 493 AD), also spelled Odovacer or Odovacar, (Note: Odoacer was also called "Flavius" on a few coins. It had become an honorific extension of names by the 5th century.) was a soldier and statesman of non-Roman heritage who, as an officer of the Roman army, deposed the Western Roman child emperor Romulus Augustulus to become the ruler of Italy in the period 476–493 AD. His takeover is traditionally understood as marking the end of the Western Roman Empire.

Although he ruled Italy, Odoacer styled himself a client of the Eastern emperor Zeno in Constantinople. He was addressed not only as rex but also as dux and patrician, the latter title granted by Zeno. In the sole surviving document from his chancery—and by the consul Basilius—Odoacer used the title of king. (Note: Marcellinus, Cassiodorus, and several papal documents call him rex; Jordanes once names him Gothorum Romanorumque regnator. Procopius labels him autokrator and tyrannos. Only Victor Vitensis writes Odouacro Italiae regi.) Backed by the Roman Senate, he distributed land with little resistance. Soldier unrest in 477–478 caused violence, but his later reign was stable. Though an Arian, he seldom interfered in the Trinitarian state church.

Before taking control of Italy, Odoacer led the revolt of Herulian, Rugian, and Scirian troops that deposed Romulus Augustulus on 4 September 476. The boy-emperor, elevated by his father Orestes less than a year earlier, never gained authority beyond central Italy. With senatorial support, Odoacer then ruled autonomously while formally recognizing both Julius Nepos and Zeno. After Nepos's murder in 480, Odoacer invaded Dalmatia, executed the conspirators, and annexed the region within two years.

In 484, when Illus, Eastern magister militum, sought his aid against Zeno, Odoacer invaded the emperor's western provinces. Zeno retaliated by spurring the Rugii to attack Italy, but Odoacer crushed them north of the Danube in 487–488. To end the conflict, Zeno unleashed the Ostrogoth Theodoric the Great, who invaded in 489, seized most of Italy by 490, and forced Odoacer into Ravenna. After the city surrendered on 5 March 493, Theodoric invited him to a reconciliation banquet, where he murdered Odoacer and claimed the throne.

== Origins ==
=== Name etymology ===
The origin of the name Odoacer, which may give indications as to his tribal affiliation, is debated. It is however traditionally derived from the Germanic components *auda (luck, possession, wealth) and *wakra (awake, vigilant, lively), probably from an unidentified East Germanic language. In favour of this etymology, this form has a cognate in another Germanic language, the titular Eadwacer of the Old English poem Wulf and Eadwacer (where Old English renders the earlier Germanic sound au- as ea-).

However, historians Robert L. Reynolds and Robert S. Lopez explored the possibility that the name Odoacer was not Germanic, making several arguments that his ethnic background might lie elsewhere. They argue that no convincing Germanic etymology has been found for the name Odoacer; instead, they propose that it could be a form of the Turkic "Ot-toghar" ("grass-born" or "fire-born"), or the shorter form "Ot-ghar" ("herder"). There is also debate regarding the etymology of Edeco, the apparent name of Odoacer's father. Omeljan Pritsak considered it Turkic; others such as Peter Heather continue to consider it Germanic.

The name of Odoacer's brother, Hunulf or Onulf, is generally accepted to be Germanic "Hun wolf". Reynolds and Lopez emphasized that the first part, "hun", although the meaning is uncertain, may refer to the Huns. Odoacer's son is given two different names in ancient sources, Thelan and Oklan. Reynolds and Lopez compare these to Turkic names: "Thelan resembles the name borne by the khagan of the eastern Turks, Tulan, who reigned from 587 to 600 A.D. Oklan resembles closely the Turkish-Tatar word oghlan, 'youth'".

The assumption that the etymology of Odoacer's name can be used to determine his ancestry or language has been criticized by historians and philologists such as Otto J. Maenchen-Helfen and Walter Pohl, who have pointed out that Germanic-speakers used Hunnic names in this period and region, and vice versa. As emphasized by Pohl, the same person could be considered Hunnic or Germanic under different circumstances, especially during the upheavals after Attila's death, and "the ruling class of Attila's empire continued to influence tribal politics even after its collapse".

=== Father and brother ===
In a fragment from a history of Priscus, reproduced in the 7th century by John of Antioch, Odoacer is described as a man of the Sciri, the son of Edeco ("Idiko"), and brother of Hunulf who killed Armatus in the eastern Roman empire. The Anonymus Valesianus agrees that his father's name was Edeko ("Aediko"), and refers to him leading Sciri and Heruli.

Another record of an Edica—apparently the same person—is found in Jordanes, who identified him as a leader of the Sciri along with a person named Hunuulf (presumably his son), after the fall of Attila. They were defeated by the Ostrogoths at the Battle of Bolia in Pannonia about 469.

An earlier Edeco ("Edekon") was described by Priscus as a trusted man of Attila, and ambassador to Constantinople. He escorted Priscus and other Imperial dignitaries back to Attila's camp. It is not universally accepted that this Edeco is the father of Odoacer. Priscus once calls him a Scythian, and another time a Hun. It has been argued that classifications like "Scythian" or "Hun" from this period could refer to social type and lifestyle rather than an exact ethnic origin. Macbain, however, argues that Priscus was careful with such terms, and sees this as evidence that Edeco cannot be the Scirian father of Odoacer.

=== Ethnic affiliations ===
Except for the fact that he was not considered Roman, Odoacer's precise ethnic origins are not known. (Note: For more on this, see: Stefan Krautschick, "Zwei Aspekte des Jahres 476", Historia: Zeitschrift für Alte Geschichte, 35 (1986), pp. 344–371.) His origins probably lie in the multi-ethnic empire of Attila a generation earlier, which included several groups referred to in this period as "Gothic peoples"—the same polyethnic complex which dominated the military forces that he is most famous for leading throughout his later life. On that basis, he is likely at least partly of Germanic descent. Early medieval sources such as Theophanes called him a Goth. Likewise, the 6th century chronicler Marcellinus Comes called him a "king of the Goths" (Odoacer rex Gothorum). (Note: Marcellinus Comes, Chronicon, s. a. 476.)

One of the most important sources for this topic has been the 6th-century writer Jordanes, who associated him with several of the Gothic peoples who came to the Middle Danube during the time of Attila's empire, including the Sciri, Heruli, and Rugii. In several passages, Jordanes also associated Odoacer with the otherwise unknown Turcilingi—who may have been a people or perhaps a dynasty. The Turcilingi are not mentioned in any other historical sources apart from those derived from Jordanes and their ethnic affiliations are unclear, but they may have been Gothic, Hunnic, or even precursors of the Thuringi. While in one passage of Getica, Jordanes describes Odoacer as king of the Turcilingi (Torcilingorum rex) with Scirian and Heruli followers, in another passage Jordanes calls him the king of "Torcilingi and Rugi". In his Romana, the same author defines Odoacer as being "of Rugian descent, strengthened by crowds of Thorcilingi, of Sciri and of Heruli". (Note: See:Jordanes, Romana 344.) It has also been pointed out by Reynolds and Lopez that Attila had an uncle named Rogus and that Jordanes may have been saying Odoacer was his descendant. The near contemporary Auctorium Havniense also calls Odoacer a king of Heruli. Many historians, such as medieval scholar Michael Frassetto, accept that Odoacer was of Scirian heritage, because of the apparent family links to Edeko and Hunulf.

The Scirii, Rugii and Heruli were among those known to contemporaries such as the historian Procopius as "Gothic peoples". The Scirii and Heruli both appear to have come to the Danubian area from the direction of what is now Ukraine, as did the Goths, Huns, and Alans, while the Rugii originated on the south Baltic coast. After the death of Attila in 453, these peoples fought at the Battle of Nedao in 454, when the Ostrogoths failed to gain dominance. They fought again at the Battle of Bolia in 468, when the Ostrogoths scored a devastating victory. After this, the Scirii, Rugii and Heruli made up a large part of the military force Odoacer came to control in Italy, while the Ostrogoths moved into Eastern Roman territory in the Balkans.

On the other hand, scholars are divided about whether Jordanes can be relied upon concerning the "Turcilingi". It has also been proposed that these are an otherwise unknown Turkic speaking people among the Huns. Whether or not this is accepted, there is also an argument that the Turcilingi mentioned by Jordanes were early Thuringians, who established a kingdom by about this time in what is now central Germany, relatively far to the north of the Danubian kingdoms. In favour of this argument, the 10th century Suda identifies Odoacer's apparent brother Hunulf as a Thuringian on his father's side and Scirian on his mother's side. This fragment is thought to have been written by the 5th-century historian Malchus, who was a near contemporary and likely to be well-informed.

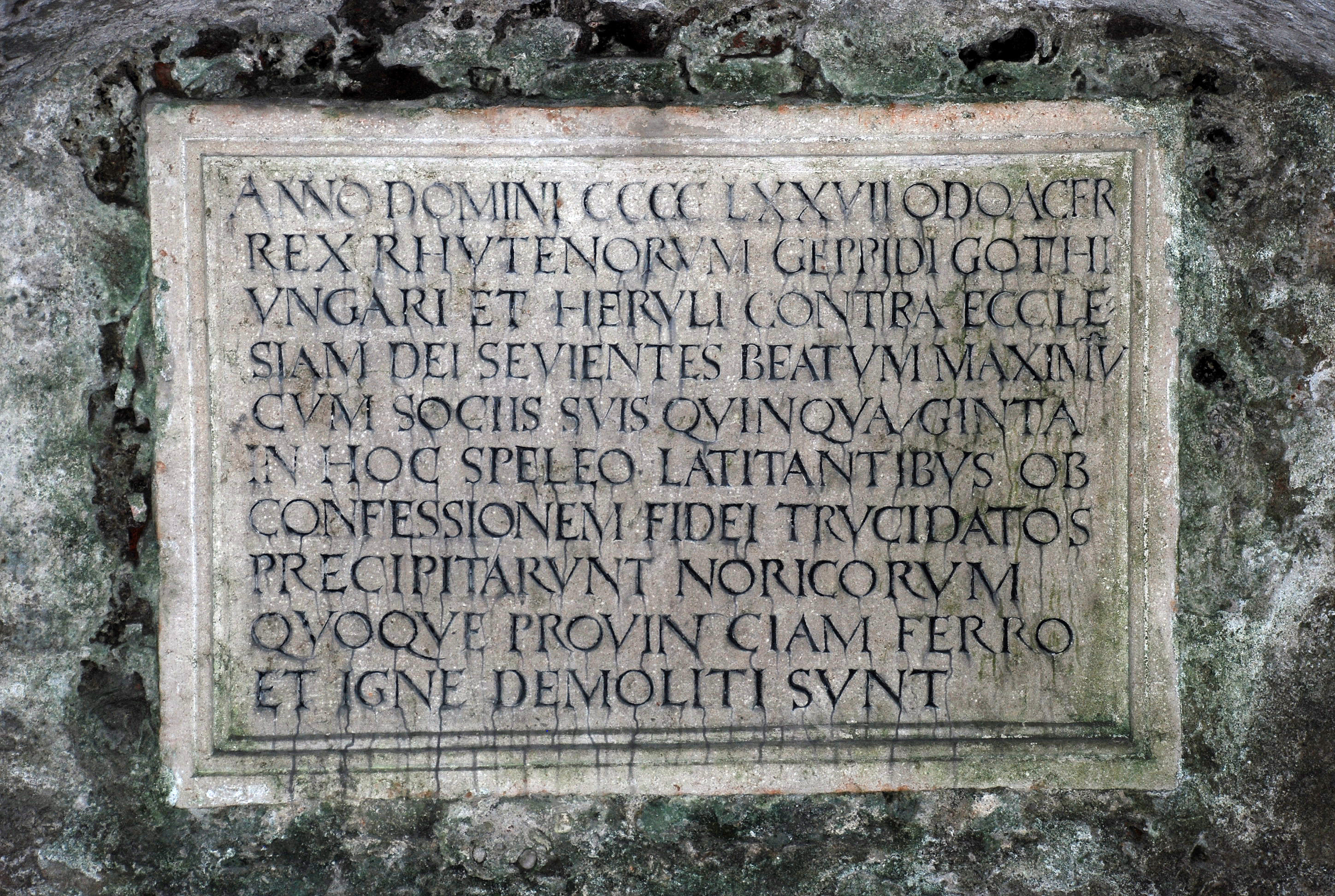
Latin memorial plate from 1521, that mentions Odoacer as Rex Rhutenorum (Petersfriedhof, Salzburg)

Much later, a memorial plate from 1521 found in the catacombe Chapel of St Maximus in Petersfriedhof—the burial site of St Peter's Abbey in Salzburg (Austria)—mentions Odoacer as King of "Rhutenes" or "Rhutenians" (Latin: Rex Rhvtenorvm), who invaded Noricum in 477. Due to its very late date of 1521 and several anachronistic elements, the content of that plate is considered nothing more than a legend. In spite of that, the plate has become a popular "source" for several theorists that try to connect Odoacer with ancient Celtic Ruthenes, and also with later Slavic Ruthenians. Historian Paul R. Magocsi argues such theories should be regarded as "inventive tales" of "creative" writers and nothing more.

Finally, a passage from Eugippius's Life of Saint Severinus indicated that Odoacer was so tall that he had to bend down to pass through the doorway, which historian Bruce Macbain considers another strong argument that he was unlikely to have been a Hun, as ancient sources describe the Huns as shorter than Romans.

Historians such as Penny MacGeorge and Macbain avow that Odoacer was likely half-Scirian and half-Thuringian. Macbain notes that "whatever the Skirians may have been [...] no one doubts that the Thuringians were Germans", and that while the "ancient sources exhibit considerable confusion over Odovacer's tribal affiliation" none of them calls Odoacer a Hun. Historian Patrick Amory explains that "Odoacer is called a Scirian, a Rugian, a Goth or a Thuringian in sources; his father is called a Hun, his mother a Scirian. Odoacer's father Edeco was associated first with the Huns under Attila, and then with a group called Sciri, an ethnographic name that appears intermittently in fifth-century sources." Historian Erik Jensen also avows that Odoacer was born to a Gothic mother and that his father Edeco was a Hun.

== Before Italy ==
John of Antioch reported that he was 60 years old when he died in 493, indicating a birth year of about 433.

There are two recorded incidents involving military leaders with the name Odoacer preserved in the History of the Franks of Gregory of Tours, using two different spellings and involving two different regions. These involve events which were early enough to be Odoacer before his appearance in Italy. Both were during the lifetime of Childeric I, king of the Franks, who died about 481.

In the first mention, a confused or confusing report is given of a number of battles in about 463 fought by Childeric, Aegidius, Count Paul, and one "Adovacrius" (with an "a") who was leading a group of Saxons based at the mouth of the Loire. Though there is no consensus, some historians, such as Reynolds and Lopez, have suggested that this Adovacrius may be the same person as the future king of Italy. Matthias Springer has noted that Odoacer's involvement with northern European Saxons in this period would be consistent with the proposal that he had Thuringian ancestry, pointing out that the term Saxon in this period was probably not a distinct ethnic label.

In a second mention by Gregory of Tours, an Odovacrius (with an "o") made an alliance with the same Childeric, and together they fought the Alamanni, who had been causing problems in Italy. This Odoacer, with his connection to the region north of Italy, and his "o" spelling, is probably the future king of Italy, before he was king.

Another early recorded event which is more certainly about Odoacer the future king, was shortly before he arrived in Italy. Eugippius, in his Life of Saint Severinus, records how a group of barbarians on their way to Italy stopped to pay their respects to the holy man. Odoacer, at the time "a young man, of tall figure, clad in poor clothes", learned from Severinus that he would one day become famous. Despite the fact that Odoacer was an Arian Christian and Severinus was Catholic, the latter left a deep impression on him. When Odoacer took his leave, Severinus made one final comment which proved prophetic: "Go to Italy, go, now covered with mean hides; soon you will make rich gifts to many." (Note: Translator of Eugippius' The Life of Saint Severin, Ludwig Bieler, explains in a footnote that "make rich gifts to many" refers to the custom of Germanic war leaders giving lavishly to their followers, because "generosity was one of the virtues which a king was supposed to have".)

== Leader of the foederati ==
By 470, Odoacer had become an officer in what remained of the Roman Army. Although Jordanes writes of Odoacer as invading Italy "as leader of the Sciri, the Heruli and allies of various races", modern writers describe him as being part of the Roman military establishment, based on John of Antioch's statement that Odoacer was on the side of Ricimer at the beginning of his battle with the emperor Anthemius in 472. Odoacer is said to have "hastened the emperor's downfall", since he switched sides to join with Ricimer. (Note: Also See: John of Antioch, fragment 209; translated by C. D. Gordon, Age of Attila, p. 122.) Procopius describes him as one of the Emperor's bodyguards, only agreeing to this position if placed in charge of them.

When Orestes was in 475 appointed Magister militum and patrician by the Western Roman Emperor Julius Nepos, Odoacer became head of the barbarian foederati military forces of Italy. Under the command of Orestes were significant contingents of Germanic peoples made up mostly of Rugii and Heruli tribesmen. Before the end of that year Orestes had rebelled and driven Nepos from Italy. Orestes then proclaimed his young son Romulus the new emperor as Romulus Augustus, called "Augustulus" (31 October). At this time, Odoacer was a soldier rising through the ranks. However, Nepos reorganized his court in Salona in Dalmatia, and received homage and affirmation from the remaining fragments of the Western Empire beyond Italy and, most importantly, from Constantinople, which refused to accept Augustulus, Zeno having branded him and his father as traitors and usurpers.

About this time, the foederati, who had been quartered in Italy all of these years, had grown weary of this arrangement. In the words of J. B. Bury, "They desired to have roof-trees and lands of their own, and they petitioned Orestes to reward them for their services, by granting them lands and settling them permanently in Italy". Orestes refused their petition, and they turned to Odoacer to lead their revolt against Orestes. Orestes was killed at Placentia; his brother Paulus was later killed defending Ravenna. The Germanic foederati, the Scirians and the Heruli, as well as a large segment of the Italic Roman army, then proclaimed Odoacer rex ("king") on 23 August 476. Odoacer then advanced to Ravenna and captured the city, compelling the young emperor Romulus to abdicate on 4 September. According to the Anonymus Valesianus, Odoacer was moved by Romulus's youth and his beauty to not only spare his life but give him a pension of 6,000 solidi and sent him to Campania to live with his relatives. (Note: Also see: Anonymus Valesianus, 8.38. Text and English translation of this document is in J. C. Rolfe (trans.), Ammianus Marcellinus (Cambridge: Harvard University Press, 1972), vol. 3 pp. 531ff)

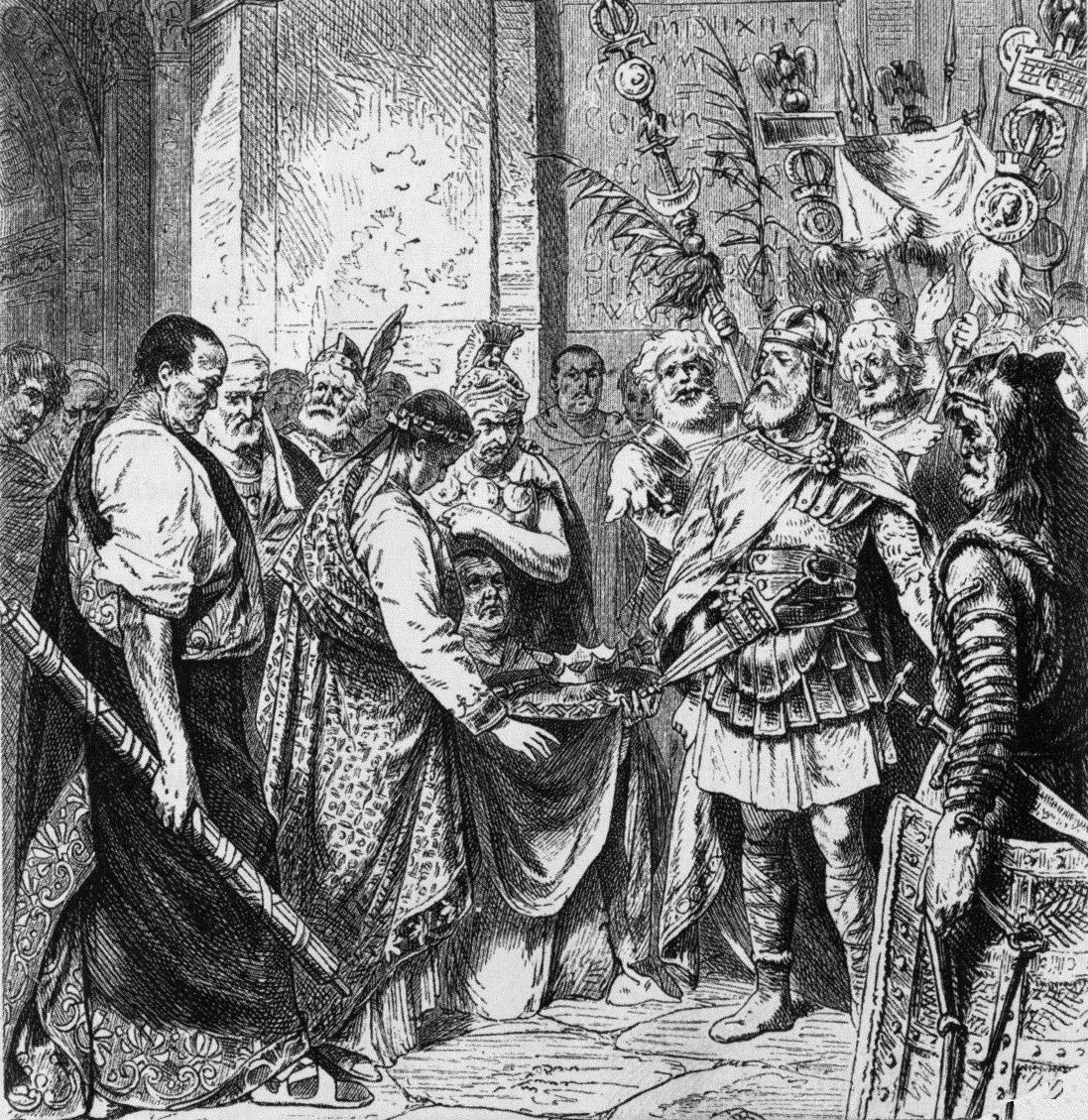
Romulus Augustus resigns the Crown (from a 19th-century illustration).

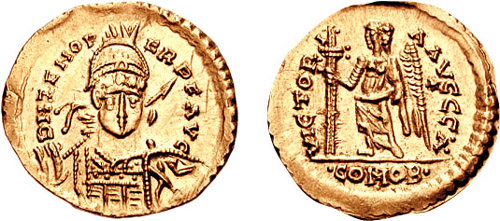
Odoacer solidus struck in the name of Emperor Zeno, testifying to the formal submission of Odoacer to Zeno

Following Romulus Augustus's deposition, according to the historian Malchus, upon hearing of the accession of Zeno to the throne, the Senate in Rome sent an embassy to the Eastern Emperor and bestowed upon him the Western imperial insignia. The message was clear: the West no longer required a separate Emperor, for "one monarch sufficed [to rule] the world". In response, Zeno accepted their gifts and this essentially brought to an end any puppet emperors in the West, with Nepos banished and Anthemius dead. The Eastern Emperor then conferred upon Odoacer the title of Patrician and granted him legal authority to govern Italy in the name of Rome, as dux Italiae. Zeno also suggested that Odoacer should receive Nepos back as Emperor in the West, "if he truly wished to act with justice". (Note: See:Malchus, fragment 10, translated in C. D. Gordon, The Age of Attila, pp. 127–129.) Although he accepted the title of Patrician and Dux from Zeno, Odoacer did not invite Julius Nepos to return to Rome, and the latter remained in Dalmatia until his death. Odoacer was careful to observe form, however, and made a pretence of acting on Nepos's authority, even issuing coins with both his image and that of Zeno. Following Nepos's murder in 480, Zeno became sole Emperor.

Bury, however, disagrees that Odoacer's assumption of power marked the fall of the Western Roman Empire:

It stands out prominently as an important stage in the process of the dismemberment of the Empire. It belongs to the same catalogue of chronological dates which includes A.D. 418, when Honorius settled the Goths in Aquitaine, and A.D. 435, when Valentinian ceded African lands to the Vandals. In A.D. 476 the same principle of disintegration was first applied to Italy. The settlement of Odovacar's East Germans, with Zeno's acquiescence, began the process by which Italian soil was to pass into the hands of Ostrogoths and Lombards, Franks and Normans. And Odovacar's title of king emphasised the significance of the change.

== Reign ==
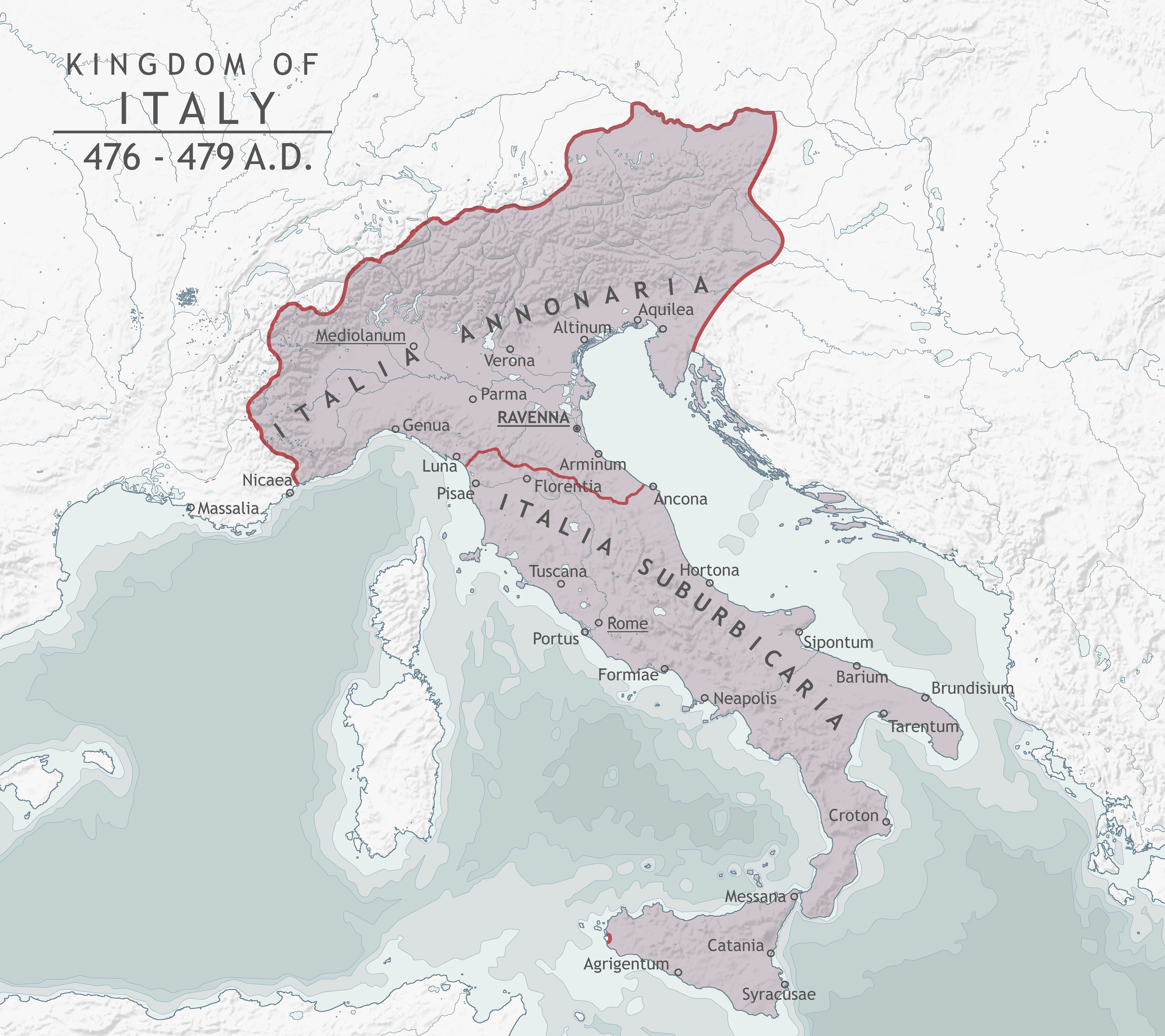
Odoacer's kingdom in 476

In 476, Odoacer was proclaimed rex by his soldiers and dux Italiae by emperor Zeno, initiating a new administrative era over Roman lands. Odoacer introduced a few important changes to the administrative system of Italy. According to Jordanes, at the beginning of his reign he "slew Count Bracila at Ravenna that he might inspire a fear of himself among the Romans." He took many military actions to strengthen his control over Italy and its neighbouring areas. He achieved a solid diplomatic coup by inducing the Vandal king Gaiseric to cede Sicily to him. Noting that "Odovacar seized power in August of 476, Gaiseric died in January 477, and the sea usually became closed to navigation around the beginning of November", F. M. Clover dates this cession to September or October 476. When Julius Nepos was murdered by two of his retainers in his country house near Salona (9 May 480), Odoacer assumed the duty of pursuing and executing the assassins, and at the same time established his own rule in Dalmatia.

As Bury points out, "It is highly important to observe that Odovacar established his political power with the co-operation of the Roman Senate, and this body seems to have given him their loyal support throughout his reign, so far as our meagre sources permit us to draw inferences." He regularly nominated members of the Senate to the Consulate and other prestigious offices: "Basilius, Decius, Venantius, and Manlius Boethius held the consulship and were either Prefects of Rome or Praetorian Prefects; Symmachus and Sividius were consuls and Prefects of Rome; another senator of old family, Cassiodorus, was appointed a minister of finance." A. H. M. Jones also notes that under Odoacer the Senate acquired "enhanced prestige and influence" in order to counter any desires for restoration of Imperial rule. As the most tangible example of this renewed prestige, for the first time since the mid-3rd century copper coins were issued with the legend S(enatus) C(onsulto). Jones describes these coins as "fine big copper pieces", which were "a great improvement on the miserable little nummi hitherto current", and not only were they copied by the Vandals in Africa, but they formed the basis of the currency reform by Anastasius in the Eastern Empire.

Although Odoacer was an Arian Christian, his relations with the Chalcedonian church hierarchy were remarkably good. As G. M. Cook notes in her introduction to Magnus Felix Ennodius's Life of Saint Epiphanius, he showed great esteem for Bishop Epiphanius: in response to the bishop's petition, Odoacer granted the inhabitants of Liguria a five-year immunity from taxes, and again granted his requests for relief from abuses by the praetorian prefect. (Note: Cook writes, "One wonders at [Ennodius'] brevity", adding that during "the thirteen years of Odovacar's mastery of Italy ... a period which embraced nearly half the episcopate of Epiphanius–Ennodius devotes but eight sections of the vita (101–107), five of which are taken up with the restoration of the churches." Cook uses Ennodius's brevity as an argumentum ex silentio to prove that Odoacer was very supportive of the Church. "Ennodius was a loyal supporter of Theodoric the Great. Any oppression, therefore, on the part of Odovacar would not be passed over in silence." She concludes that Ennodius's silence "may be construed as an unintentional tribute to the moderation and tolerance of the barbarian king".) The biography of Pope Felix III in the Liber Pontificalis openly states that the pontiff's tenure occurred during Odoacer's reign without any complaints about the king being registered.

In 487/488, Odoacer led his army to victory against the Rugians in Noricum, taking their king Feletheus into captivity; when word that Feletheus's son, Fredericus, had returned to his people, Odoacer sent his brother Onoulphus with an army back to Noricum against him. Onoulphus found it necessary to evacuate the remaining Romans and resettled them in Italy. The remaining Rugians fled and took refuge with the Ostrogoths; the abandoned province was settled by the Lombards by 493.

== Fall and death ==
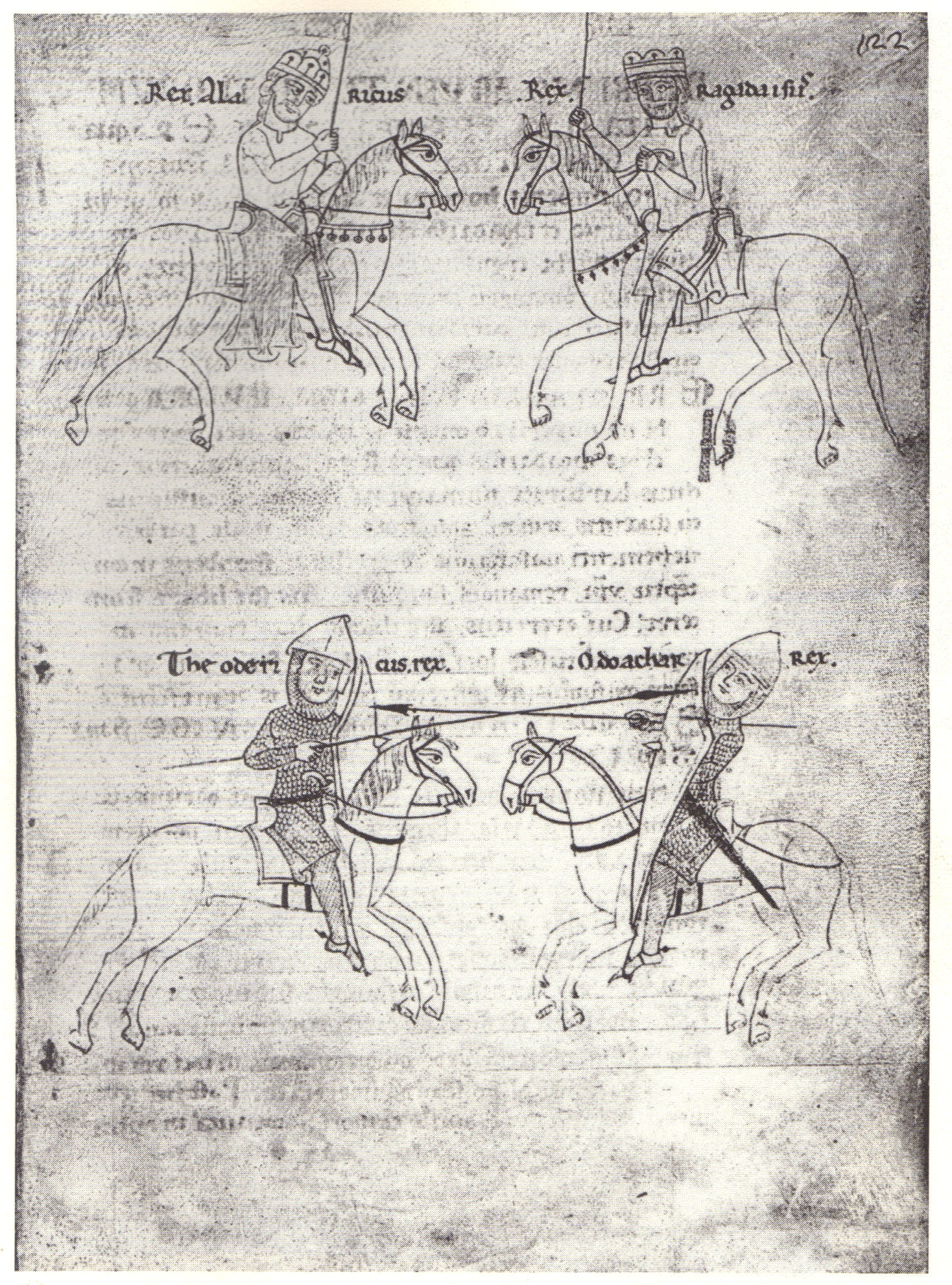
An early illustration of a mythologized Theodoric killing Odoacer in a joust; from the Chronica Theodericiana (1181)

As Odoacer's position improved, Zeno, the Eastern Emperor, increasingly saw him as a rival. Odoacer exchanged messages with Illus, who had been in open revolt against Zeno since 484. (Note: Also see: John of Antioch, fragment 214; translated by C. D. Gordon, Age of Attila, p. 152.) Switching allegiances, Zeno subsequently sought to destroy Odoacer and then promised Theodoric the Great and his Ostrogoths the Italian peninsula if they were to defeat and remove Odoacer. As both Herwig Wolfram and Peter Heather point out, Theodoric had his own reasons to agree to this offer: "Theodoric had enough experience to know (or at least suspect) that Zeno would not, in the long term, tolerate his independent power. When Theodoric rebelled in 485, we are told, he had in mind Zeno's treatment of Armatus. Armatus defected from Basilicus to Zeno in 476, and was made senior imperial general for life. Within a year, Zeno had him assassinated."

In 489, Theodoric led the Ostrogoths across the Julian Alps and into Italy. On 28 August, Odoacer met him at the Isonzo, only to be defeated. (Note: For several years the armies of Odoacer and Theodoric marched back and forth as they vied for control of Italy.) He withdrew to Verona, reaching its outskirts on 27 September, where he immediately set up a fortified camp. Theodoric followed him and three days later defeated him again. (Note: See also: Anonymus Valesianus, 11.50f. This follows how Thomas Hodgkins explains this confusing chronology of the Anonymus Valesianus; Italy and her Invaders (Oxford, 1885), vol. 4 p. 214.) While Odoacer took refuge in Ravenna, Theodoric continued across Italy to Mediolanum, where the majority of Odoacer's army, including his chief general Tufa, surrendered to the Ostrogothic king. (Note: Also See:Anonymus Valesianus, 11.52.) Theodoric had no reason to doubt Tufa's loyalty and dispatched his new general to Ravenna with a band of elite soldiers. Herwig Wolfram observes, "But Tufa changed sides, the Gothic elite force entrusted to his command was destroyed, and Theodoric suffered his first serious defeat on Italian soil." Theodoric recoiled by seeking safety in Ticinum. Odoacer emerged from Ravenna and started to besiege his rival. While both were fully engaged, the Burgundians seized the opportunity to plunder and devastate Liguria. Many Romans were taken into captivity and did not regain their freedom until Theodoric ransomed them three years later.

The following summer, the Visigothic king Alaric II demonstrated what Wolfram calls "one of the rare displays of Gothic solidarity" and sent military aid to help his kinsman, forcing Odoacer to raise his siege. Theodoric emerged from Ticinum, and on 11 August 490, the armies of the two kings clashed on the Adda River. Odoacer again was defeated and forced back into Ravenna, where Theodoric besieged him. Ravenna proved to be invulnerable, surrounded by marshes and estuaries and easily supplied by small boats from its hinterlands, as Procopius later pointed out in his History. Further, Tufa remained at large in the strategic valley of the Adige near Trent, and received unexpected reinforcements when dissent amongst Theodoric's ranks led to sizable desertions. That same year, the Vandals took their turn to strike while both sides were fully engaged and invaded Sicily. While Theodoric was engaged with them, his ally Fredericus, king of the Rugians, began to oppress the inhabitants of Pavia, whom the latter's forces had been garrisoned to protect. Once Theodoric intervened in person in late August 491, his punitive acts drove Fredericus to desert with his followers to Tufa. (Note: Wolfram suggests that sometime in 492 or 493, Fredericus and Tufa quarrelled and fought a battle, during which both were killed. To this Wolfram adds, that the Rugians "rejoined the Gothic king" (by whom, he means Theodoric).)

By this time, however, Odoacer appeared to have lost all hope of victory. A large-scale sortie he sent out of Ravenna on the night of 9/10 July 491 ended in failure, during which his commander-in-chief, Livilia, along with the best of his Herulian soldiers, was killed. On 29 August 492, the Goths were about to assemble enough ships at Rimini to set up an effective blockade of Ravenna. Despite these decisive losses, the war dragged on until 25 February 493 when John, bishop of Ravenna, was able to negotiate a treaty between Theodoric and Odoacer to occupy Ravenna together and share joint rule. After a three-year siege, Theodoric entered the city on 5 March. Odoacer died ten days later, slain by Theodoric while they shared a meal. Theodoric had plotted to have a group of his followers kill him while the two kings were feasting together in the imperial palace of Honorius "Ad Laurentum" ("At the Laurel Grove"); when this plan went astray, Theodoric drew his sword and struck him on the collarbone. In response to Odoacer's dying question, "Where is God?" Theodoric cried, "This is what you did to my friends." Theodoric was said to have stood over the body of his dead rival and exclaimed, "The man has no bones in his body." (Note: John of Antioch, fragment 214a; translated by C. D. Gordon, reports the statement as "There certainly wasn't a bone in this wretched fellow". Age of Attila, pp. 182f. Both the Anonymus Valesianus (11.55) and Andreas Agnellus (Liber pontificalis ecclesiae Ravennatis, ch. 39) places the murder in Ad Laurentum. Herwig Wolfram explains Theodoric's claim of avenging his "friends" as recompense for the death of a Rugian royal couple – "it apparently did not matter that their son was at that very moment in open rebellion against Theodoric.")

Not only did Theodoric slay Odoacer, he thereafter had the betrayed king's loyal followers hunted down and killed as well, an event which left him as the master of Italy. (Note: According to one account, "That same day, all of Odoacer's army who could be found anywhere were killed by order of Theodoric, as well as all of his family". (Note: See:Anonymus Valesianus 11.56)) Odoacer's wife Sunigilda was stoned to death, (Note: However, Wolfram writes that Sunigilda was starved to death.) and his brother Onoulphus was killed by archers while seeking refuge in a church. Theodoric exiled Odoacer's son Thela to Gaul, but when he attempted to return to Italy Theodoric had him killed. (Note: See: John of Antioch, fragment 214a.) Despite the tragic ending of his domain, followers, and family, Odoacer left an important legacy, in that he had laid the foundations of a great kingdom in Italy that benefited Theodoric the Great.

== Later portrayals ==
- The Old High German Hildebrandslied mentions Odoacer (as Otacher) as the person who drove Hildebrand from his home.
- The Old English poem "Wulf and Eadwacer" has been thought to be a legendary retelling of part of Odoacer's story.

== See also ==
- Alaric I
- Gaiseric
- Germanic peoples
- Barbarian invasions
- Kingdom of Odoacer

== Sources ==
- Amory, Patrick (1997). People and Identity in Ostrogothic Italy, 489–554. Cambridge; New York: Cambridge University Press. ISBN 978-0-51152-306-9.
- Bernard, Jack F. (1970). Up from Caesar: A Survey of the History of Italy from the Fall of the Roman Empire to the Collapse of Fascism. New York: Doubleday & Co. OCLC 806326076.
- Bunson, Matthew (1995). A Dictionary of the Roman Empire. Oxford and New York: Oxford University Press. ISBN 978-0-19510-233-8.
- Bury, J. B. (1923). History of the Later Roman Empire: From the Death of Theodosius I to the Death of Justinian. Vol. I. New York: Macmillan. OCLC 963903029.
- Bury, J. B. (1958). History of the Later Roman Empire: From the Death of Theodosius I to the Death of Justinian. Vol. II. New York: Dover Publications Inc. OCLC 62206973.
- Castritius, Helmut (2005). "Skiren (Histrorisch)". In Beck, Heinrich; Geuenich, Dieter; Steuer, Heiko (eds.). Reallexikon der Germanischen Altertumskunde. Vol. 28 (2 ed.). ISBN 978-3-11-018207-1.
- Cameron, Alan (1988). "Flavius: a Nicety of Protocol". Latomus. 47 (1): 26–33. JSTOR 41540754.
- Clover, Frank M. (1999). "A Game of Bluff: The Fate of Sicily after A.D. 476". Historia: Zeitschrift für Alte Geschichte. 48 (1): 235–244. JSTOR 4436542.
- Davis, Raymond (2001). Book of the Pontiffs (Liber Pontificalis). Liverpool: Liverpool University Press. ISBN 978-0-85323-545-3.
- Delbrück, Hans (1990). The Barbarian Invasions. History of the Art of War. Vol. II. Lincoln and London: University of Nebraska Press. ISBN 978-0-80329-200-0.
- Dopsch, Heinz; Hoffmann, Robert (2008). Salzburg. Die Geschichte einer Stadt (2nd ed.). Salzburg: Anton Pustet. ISBN 978-3-70250-598-1.
- Ennodius, Magnus Felix (1942). The Life of Saint Epiphanius. Translated, Edited, and Commentary by Genevieve Marie Cook. Washington DC: Catholic University Press. OCLC 883796942.
- Elton, Hugh (2018). The Roman Empire in Late Antiquity: A Political and Military History. Cambridge and New York: Cambridge University Press. ISBN 978-1-10845-631-9.
- Eugippius (1965). "Commemoratorium Severinus". The Life of Saint Severin. Translated by Ludwig Bieler. Washington DC: Catholic University Press. OCLC 422145289.
- Frassetto, Michael (2003). Encyclopedia of Barbarian Europe: Society in Transformation. Santa Barbara, CA: ABC-CLIO. ISBN 978-1-57607-263-9.
- Gibbon, Edward (1998) [1789]. The Decline and Fall of the Roman Empire. London: Wordsworth Editions. ISBN 978-1-85326-499-3.
- Goldsworthy, Adrian (2009). How Rome Fell: Death of a Superpower. New Haven and London: Yale University Press. ISBN 978-0-30013-719-4.
- Grant, Michael (1998). From Rome to Byzantium: The Fifth Century AD. London and New York: Routledge. ISBN 978-1-13516-672-4.
- Gregory of Tours (1974). The History of the Franks. Translated by Lewis Thorpe. New York: Penguin Books. ISBN 978-0-14044-295-3.
- Halsall, Guy (2007). Barbarian Migrations and the Roman West, 376–568. Cambridge and New York: Cambridge University Press. ISBN 978-0-52143-543-7.
- Heather, Peter (1996). The Goths. Oxford: Blackwell. ISBN 978-0-63120-932-4.
- Heather, Peter (2005). The Fall of the Roman Empire: A New History of Rome and the Barbarians. Oxford and New York: Oxford University Press. ISBN 978-0-19515-954-7.
- Heather, Peter (2013). The Restoration of Rome: Barbarian Popes & Imperial Pretenders. Oxford: Oxford University Press. ISBN 978-0-19-936851-8.
- Jensen, Erik (2018). Barbarians in the Greek and Roman World. Cambridge; Indianapolis: Hackett Publishing. ISBN 978-1-62466-712-1.
- Jones, A. H. M. (1986). "The Fall of the Western Empire and the Barbarian Kingdoms". The Later Roman Empire, 284–602: A Social, Economic, and Administrative Survey. Vol. I. Baltimore, MD: Johns Hopkins University Press. ISBN 0801832845.
- Jordanes (1915). The Gothic History of Jordanes. Translated by Charles C. Mierow. London: Oxford University Press. OCLC 463056290.
- Kim, Hyun Jin (2013). The Huns, Rome and the Birth of Europe. Cambridge; New York: Cambridge University Press. ISBN 978-1-10700-906-6.
- Lee, A. D. (2013). From Rome to Byzantium AD 363 to 565: The Transformation of Ancient Rome. Edinburgh: Edinburgh University Press. ISBN 978-0-74862-790-5.
- Macbain, Bruce (1983). "Odovacer the Hun?". Classical Philology. 78 (1): 323–327. doi:10.1086/366807. JSTOR 269961. S2CID 162185151.
- Magocsi, Paul R. (2015). With Their Backs to the Mountains: A History of Carpathian Rus' and Carpatho-Rusyns. Budapest and New York: Central European University Press. ISBN 978-6155053467.
- Martindale, J. R. (1980). "Odoacer". The Prosopography of the Later Roman Empire. Vol. 2 (A.D. 395–527). London; New York: Cambridge University Press. pp. 791–793. ISBN 0-521-20159-4.
- MacGeorge, Penny (2002). Late Roman Warlords. Oxford and New York: Oxford University Press. ISBN 978-0-19-925244-2.
- Paul the Deacon (2003). History of the Lombards. Translated by William Dudley Foulke. Philadelphia: University of Pennsylvania Press. ISBN 0-8122-1079-4.
- Pohl, Walter (1986). "Edika". In Beck, Heinrich; Geuenich, Dieter; Steuer, Heiko (eds.). Reallexikon der Germanischen Altertumskunde. Vol. 6 (2 ed.). ISBN 978-3-11-010468-4.
- Pritsak, Omeljan (1982). The Hunnic Language of the Attila Clan (PDF). Vol. IV. Cambridge, Massachusetts: Harvard Ukrainian Research Institute. ISSN 0363-5570. Archived from the original (PDF) on 13 December 2016.
- Prokopios (2014). The Wars of Justinian. Translated by H. B. Dewing. Indianapolis; Cambridge: Hackett Publishing. ISBN 978-1-62466-172-3.
- Reichert, Hermann; Wolfram, Herwig (2010) [2002]. "Odowakar". In Sebastian Brather; Wilhelm Heizmann; Steffen Patzold (eds.). Germanische Altertumskunde Online. Vol. 21. ISBN 978-3-11-017272-0.
- Reynolds, Robert L.; Lopez, Robert S. (1946). "Odoacer: German or Hun?". The American Historical Review. 52 (1): 36–53. doi:10.1086/ahr/52.1.36. JSTOR 1845067.
- Shiels, Ian (2022). "'Wulf and Eadwacer' Reloaded: John of Antioch and the Starving Wife of Odoacer" (PDF). Anglia: Journal of English Philology. 140 (3–4): 373–420. doi:10.1515/ang-2022-0056. S2CID 254294773. Archived (PDF) from the original on 11 April 2024.
- Sotiroff, G. (1974). The Assassination of Justinian's Personality. Lynn Publishing. OCLC 906162550.
- Springer, Matthias (2004). Die Sachsen (in German). Kohlhammer Verlag. ISBN 978-3-17-023227-3.
- Thompson, E. A. (1982). Romans and Barbarians: The Decline of the Western Empire. Madison: University of Wisconsin Press. ISBN 0-299-08700-X.
- Voyles, Joseph (1992). Early Germanic Grammar: Pre-, Proto-, and Post-Germanic Languages. Academic Press. ISBN 0-12-728270-X.
- Wolfram, Herwig (1988). History of the Goths. Berkeley and Los Angeles: University of California Press. ISBN 0-520-05259-5.
- Wolfram, Herwig (1997). The Roman Empire and its Germanic Peoples. Berkeley and Los Angeles: University of California Press. ISBN 0-520-08511-6.

Preceded by Romulus Augustus as Western Roman Emperor; Julius Nepos as Western Roman Emperor	King of Italy; 476–493	Succeeded by Theodoric the Great
