= Rugii =

Ancient Germanic people

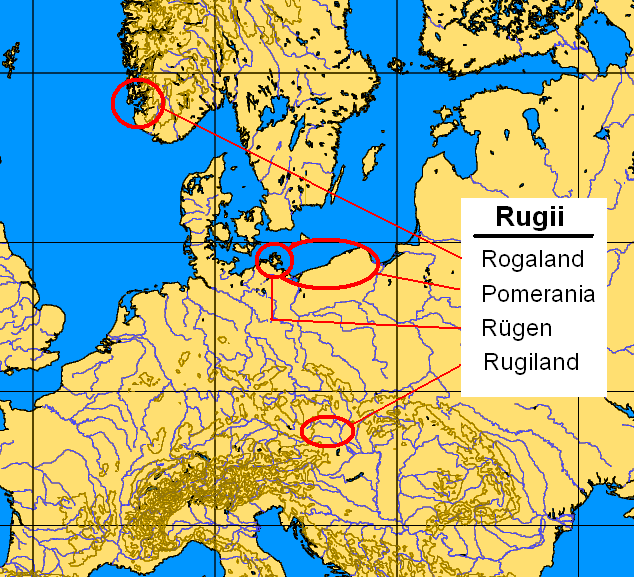
Places and peoples associated with Rugi-like names in different historical periods, including Rogaland, Rugiland (5th century); Rügen

The Rugi, Rogi or Rugians, called the Rugii in the first century, were one of the smaller Germanic peoples of Late Antiquity who are best known for their short-lived 5th-century kingdom upon the Roman frontier on the Danube river in what is now Lower Austria, west of Vienna. This kingdom first appeared in records after the death of Attila in 453. There is evidence that these Rugi had moved from the southern Baltic Sea coast in the third or fourth century, and there may even have been a continuing presence of Rugian groups in that area, and also Scandinavia, into early medieval times. However, the best-known Danubian Rugi eventually lost their kingdom, and were forced to regroup. They continued to be identifiable within the Ostrogothic Kingdom of Italy until it was destroyed by the eastern Roman emperor Justinian in 554.

The Rugi are one of the so-called "disappearing and reappearing tribes" listed by historian Peter Heather, appearing in early Roman records in one place, only to reappear centuries later in records concerning another place. Despite their very different location, it is generally accepted that the Danubian Rugi were descended from the "Rugii" who were mentioned by Tacitus in the first century, in his Germania. He described these "Rugii" living near the south Baltic shore, as neighbours of the Lemovii and Gutones. Various other records mentioning places or peoples with similar names have been associated with the Baltic Rugi as possible relatives. These similar names all appear to be related to Indo-European words for the grain rye. In the 2nd century, Ptolemy mentioned the Rutikleioi, and a place known as Rougion, near the southern Baltic coast. In the 6th century Jordanes listed the "Rogas" as an Eastern European people of the 4th century who were one of the tribes ruled by the gothic King Ermanaric, whose empire supposedly stretched from the Black Sea to regions near the Baltic Sea. The Rugi are also associated with the Ulmerugi mentioned by Jordanes. This name probably means "island Rugi", and he described them as a people who had many centuries before him lived on the Baltic coast near the Vistula, at the time when he believed the Goths arrived by boat from Scandinavia. A similar island name, Holmrygir, is known from southwestern Norway, around the Boknafjord, where Rogaland was also named after a people called the Rygir. Jordanes also listed "Rugi" among the tribes supposedly living in Scandinavia in the 5th century, near the Dani (Danes) and Suetidi (Swedes).

In 454, after the death of Attila, the Rugi, Heruli, Sciri and other peoples who had been allies within Attila's Hunnic empire were able to create short-lived, independent kingdoms in the Middle Danube region after they defeated an alliance of Attila's sons and the Ostrogoths at the Battle of Nedao. In 469 they were part of a similar alliance which lost to the Ostrogoths at the Battle of Bolia, weakening their kingdom significantly. Many Rugi, once again along with Sciri, Heruli and other Danubians, joined the Roman military in Italy, and subsequently participated in Odoacer's overthrow of the emperor and takeover of Roman Italy in 476. Odoacer nevertheless invaded the Danubian Rugian kingdom in 487 and 488, and the Rugian lands were then settled by the Lombards from the north. Rugi from the Danubian region who did not join Odoacer eventually joined the Ostrogoth Theoderic the Great, who invaded Italy and killed Odoacer. The Rugi based in Italy played an important role in the Ostrogothic Italian kingdom. One of the last kings of the Gothic kingdom of Italy was the Rugian Eraric who was killed in 541. After the defeat of the kingdom in 554, these Rugi disappear from history.

The name of the Rugi continued to be used after the sixth century to refer to Slavic-speaking peoples near the Danube where their kingdom had been. Similar names were also used to refer to the slavic Rujani what is now north-eastern Germany, near the German coastal island known today as Rügen. The name was also occasionally used as a Latin name for the Rus people of eastern Europe.

== Etymology ==
The tribal name is commonly proposed to be derived from the name of the cereal rye and would therefore have meant "rye eaters" or "rye farmers". The Proto-Germanic word for rye has been reconstructed as *rugiz, and versions of the word exist in both West Germanic (reconstructed as *rugi), and North Germanic languages (Old Norse rugr), but are not known from East Germanic. They are also known in the other language families of the Baltic region: Finnic (reconstructed in Proto-Finnic *rugis); Baltic; and Slavic (rŭžĭ). Andersson notes that etymology limits the possible places that we might expect the Rugii to have had their original homeland. For example, the cultivation of rye, which began in the Middle East, is not known in Norway in the Roman era, which implies that the later Rygir of Norway were not living in the original Rugian homeland.

Written forms of the name are attested in two types of form in classical texts, Rugii and Rugi, corresponding to the ja-stem and a-stem forms of the original Germanic. Greek and Latin records concerning the Rugians in the 4th-6th centuries use the later form ("Rugi", implying a Germanic a-stem) but the earliest attestation of the Rugians by Tacitus is "Rugii" implying a "ja-stem", and related forms have been reconstructed for the precursors of the Rygir who lived in Norway, and the Holmryge mentioned in Widsith.

Many similar historical terms have been associated with the Rugii, although the connections of all or most of these to the Rugi are contested by some scholars:

- The 2nd century geographer Ptolemy located a place called Rugion on the southern Baltic coast between the Vidua, possibly the Oder river, and Vistula.
- Ptolemy also mentioned a people called the Rutikleioi in the same region and this has been interpreted by some scholars as a scribal error for Rugikleioi (in Greek). The meaning of the second part of this name form is unclear.
- The Ulmerugi, were a people who anciently lived on the coast near the Vistula, according to the 6th century history of the Goths written by Jordanes. Scholars have traditionally interpreted this name as "island Rugi", containing the Proto-Germanic word reconstructed as *hulmaz (English holm, Old Norse holmr). An equivalent word in Old Norse holmrygir is found in Norway, near the tribe who were called the Rygir.
- In the 6th century Jordanes also listed "Rugi" among the tribes supposedly living in Scandinavia in his own time, near the Dani (Danes) and Suetidi (Swedes), but his list is difficult to interpret. There is a word before Rugi in the manuscripts with many variants including taetel, aetel, hethel, gethel, ethel, some of which are merged with Rugi. It was interpreted by Josef Svennung not to be another tribe, but rather a Germanic adjective connected to the Rugi: *aþala- (nobility, race), related to English atheling, which he believed could mean “chief, principal, main” in some contexts.
- In the medieval Widsith king list a king named Hagena is named as the ruler of people whose name (dative plural holm rycum in the Exeter Book manuscript) is reconstructed to be the Holmryge, which could be a literary reminiscence of a more ancient people such as the Ulmerugi mentioned by Jordanes.
- The Isle of Rügen on the southern Baltic coast in modern Germany is frequently associated with the Rugii of Tacitus, being in approximately the same region. However, medieval evidence indicates that Rügen's name is most likely derived from the medieval Slavic tribal name of the Rugiane, and any connection between the two names is unclear and disputed.
- The medieval Rugini are listed in a list of pagan tribes living in Germania, which was drawn up by the English monk Bede in his Historia ecclesiastica of the early 8th century. They are generally identified with the Slavs of Rügen, though this has also been disputed.
- The existence of a Norwegian people called the Holmrygir is implied in one medieval poem, Hákonarmál which mentions their soldiers being called upon by the 10th-century Norwegian king Haakon the Good.
- The medieval region of Rygjafylke in south west Norway, equivalent to modern Rogaland, is interpreted as "Land of the Rygir", and the term Rygir can be explained as the same term as Rugii, if it evolved according to the normal changes which happened to the Norse language.

== Origins ==
=== Southern Baltic coast ===
The Roman Empire under Hadrian (ruled 117–138): the Rugi inhabited a region in or near Pomerania, now divided between Germany and Poland

The earliest clear record of the "Rugii" is by Tacitus writing about 100 AD. He described them as living on the southern Baltic coast ("ocean") near the Lemovii, probably west of the Vistula estuary. Tacitus grouped these Rugii and Lemovii together with their inland neighbours the Gutones as a group of Germanic peoples (germanorum gentes) who were distinguishable from other Germanic peoples because they used round shields and short swords, and obeyed kings.

Other debatable mentions of these Baltic Rugi according to some scholars include Ptolemy's description of Rugion and a tribe named the Routikleioi in roughly the same area as the Rugi mentioned by Tacitus, and the Ulmerugi mentioned by Jordanes.

In archaeology the Oksywie culture (or German: Oxhöft-kultur) and its successor the Wielbark culture are sometimes associated with the Rugi and Lemovii, as is the Gustow group to its west in Western Pomerania, named after a site on Rügen. The Gustow group existed during the Roman imperial period from the 1st to 3rd centuries AD, and it was influenced by cultures further west near the Elbe river. It was succeeded by the archaeological Dębczyn culture.

Modern scholars have speculated that in the 2nd century AD eastern Germanic peoples in the area of modern Poland began to expand their influence, pressing peoples to their south and eventually causing the Marcomannic Wars on the Roman Danubian frontier, which led to a major collapse of old trade networks. Given the coincidence of the same name on the Baltic and Danube, the Rugi are one of the peoples thought to have been involved. While modern authors are sceptical of some elements of the old narrative, the archaeology of the Wielbark culture has given new evidence to support this idea.

In his Getica Jordanes claimed that the 4th-century Gothic king Ermanaric, who was one of the first rulers west of the Don river to confront the Huns as they entered Europe, ruled an empire stretching from the Baltic Sea to the Black Sea. In a list of the peoples conquered by him the name "Rogas" appears.

=== Scandinavia ===
According to an old proposal which was once widely accept among scholars, the "Rugii" reported by Tacitus on the Baltic coast around 100 AD had recently migrated from southwest Norway. The evidence for a connection is the existence in the Middle ages of Rygjafylke in south west Norway, the land of the "Rygir", whose name is interpreted as an equivalent to "Rugi".

Scholars such as Thorsten Andersson have regarded it as very unlikely that the name meaning "rye-eaters" or "rye-farmers" was invented twice, implying that all peoples with this name are one and the same. As evidence for the direction of movement, he cites the sixth century claim of Jordanes that Scandinavia was the "womb of nations", and also his apparent mention, in a list of names which scholars find difficult to interpret, of Rugi who were still living in Scandinavia in the 6th century. Alternatively, the Rugi might have migrated in the other direction, from the Baltic coast to Norway, while Rudolf Much proposed that the original homeland may have been on the islands of Denmark in between these two regions. However, Andersson noted that rye does not seem to have been cultivated in Norway or Denmark during Roman times, although it had begun to appear near the Baltic coast by then.

More recently, scholars such as Walter Pohl have argued that in older scholarship the similarity of names has been uncritically interpreted to indicate proof of tribal kinship or identity, feeding debates about the locations of "original homelands" and the chronologies of migrations and tribal divisions, which are not based on any historical evidence apart from the similar names. Pohl noted that there is no evidence for an immigration of the Rugii from a south Norwegian “Rogaland” into eastern Germania. He also noted that an alternative approach which still accepts the existence of links between similarly named tribes is that of Reinhard Wenskus and the Vienna School of History which proposes that the name and a "core tradition" (Traditionskern) of the Rugii could have been spread by small elite groups who moved around, rather than mass migration.

== Danubian and Italian Rugii ==
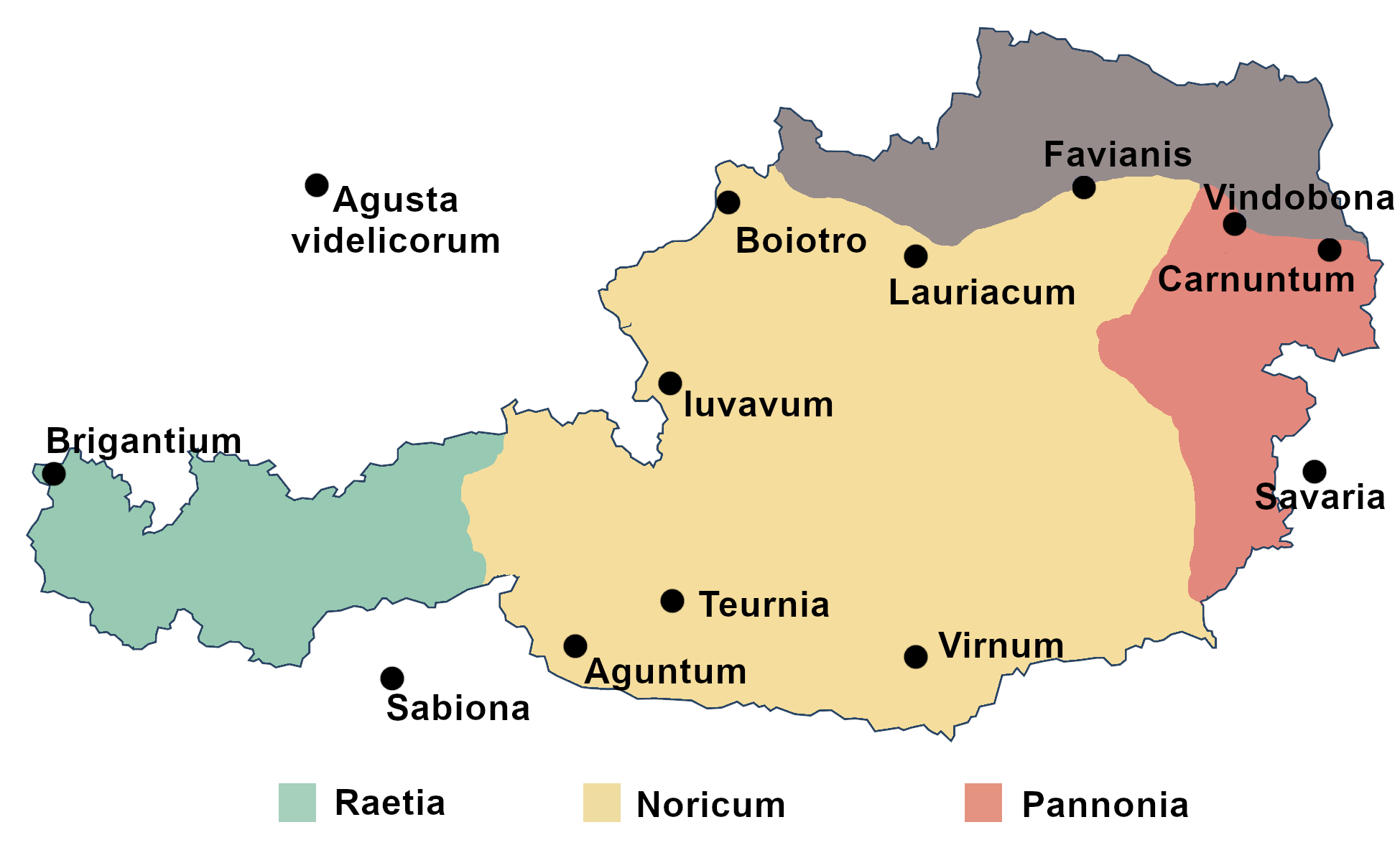
The Rugii ruled in the northernmost part of modern Austria which was not in the Roman empire

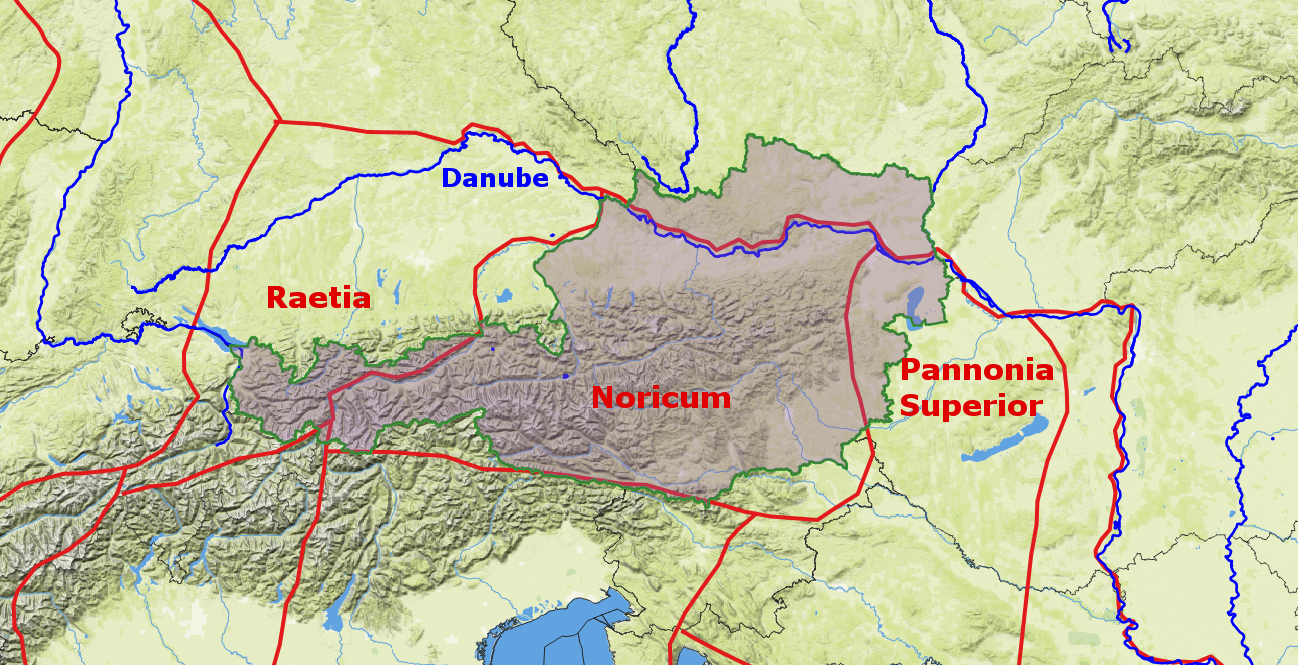
Roman provinces in the region of modern Austria

One of the first clear records of the Rugii interacting with the Roman empire is in the Laterculus Veronensis of about 314. In a list of barbarians under the emperors it lists them together with their future Danubian neighbours the Heruli, but in a part of the list between the Scottish barbarians and the tribes north of the lower Rhine. Their position is therefore unclear in this period. Unlike the Heruli, they do not appear in other such 4th-century lists.

The Rugii were listed by Sidonius Apollinaris as one of the northern peoples who were led by Attila over the Rhine, to invade Gaul, and eventually fight the Battle of the Catalaunian Plains in 451. After Attila's death in 453, the Rugii were among the Hunnic confederates who successfully rebelled against his sons, defeating them and the Ostrogoths at the Battle of Nedao in 454. Whether or not the Rugian kingdom existed before then, and in what form, is unknown.

While the best known group of Rugi, subsequently ruled a kingdom north of the Danube, west of modern Vienna, another group of Rugi were settled near Constantinople after Nadao, in Bizye and Arcadiopolis where they provided troops to the empire.

In 468/9 the Danubian kingdom of the Rugii, along with neighbouring kingdoms of Sarmatians and Gepids, sent forces to the Battle of Bolia in support of two other neighbouring kingdoms, the Suavian kingdom, and the remnants of the Sciri, against their powerful southern neighbours the Ostrogoths, who were ruling in what had been the Roman province of Pannonia. The Ostrogoths won, led by Theodemir the father of Theoderic the Great. Leading the Sciri in this disastrous battle were Edeko and Onoulphus, the father and brother respectively of Odoacer.

By 470, Odoacer was a Roman military leader in Italy, commanding a mixed group of Danubian peoples including Heruli, Sciri, Turcilingi and Rugii. In 476 Odoacer and his forces took control of Roman Italy. He removed the last Roman emperor to rule in Italy from power, Romulus Augustulus, and killed the emperor's father Orestes, who was himself a Pannonian Roman had once worked for Attila. In one passage Jordanes described Odoacer as being "of Rugian descent, strengthened by crowds of Thorcilingi, Sciri and Heruli" (genere Rogus Thorcilingorum Scirorum Herolorumque turbas munitus). and in another as the king of the Thorcilingi and of the Rugi (sub regis Thorcilingorum Rogorumque tyrranide fluctuatur).

The independent Rugian kingdom continued to exist in what is now Lower Austria. Paul the Deacon referred to their core territory as "Rugiland" and says it was a fertile region. As it was north of the Danube, it was outside the old Roman border, but the descriptions of Eugippius show that by his time they also controlled the Romanized population south of the Danube in the northern of the Roman province of Noricum. The Rugian king Flaccitheus died in 482. The Rugii of Rugiland were subsequently led by his son, king Feletheus, also called Feva, and his wife Giso. He was an Arian christian. Giso was noted for her cruelty and harshness. Arianism, the religion of most Goths, was considered to be a heresy within the Roman empire.

In 486 the emperor Zeno encouraged Feletheus to attack Odoacer, and Odoacer defeated the Danubian Rugians in 487. His own forces also included many Rugii. King Feletheus and his wife Giso were brought to Italy and executed. Frideric, the son of Feletheus, attempted to retake Rugiland with Ostrogothic support, but Onoulphus the brother of Odoacer led a new force from Italy in 488, and defeated the Rugii a second time. Odoacer ordered the evacuation of the Romanized population from Noricum, undermining the economic foundation of the Rugian kingdom. Rugiland was subsequently settled first by the Lombards, under Heruli domination, and then by the Heruli themselves for a short term, after the Lombards destroyed the Heruli kingdom. Both the Lombards and the Heruli later moved further south and were allowed to settle within Roman Pannonia in the 6th century.

Danubian Rugii who did not join Odoacer in Italy, later joined the Ostrogoths, who subsequently also went to Italy to defeat Odoacer and take control of Italy. Rugii were with the Ostrogothic king Theodoric the Great when he invaded Italy in 489. According to Procopius Theoderic convinced the Rugii and other nations, to join him in alliance, "and they were absorbed into the Gothic nation and acted in common with them in all things against their enemies." However he also noted that "since they had absolutely no intercourse with women other than their own, each successive generation of children was of unmixed blood, and thus they had preserved the name of their nation among themselves".

Under the Ostrogoths, Rugii settled in the area of Ticino, where they became unpopular with the local population. Frideric, apparently still in control of this group, joined Tufa in rebellion against Theoderic. Tufa was a former general of Odoacer who had switched to the side of Theoderic, and then back to Odoacer, and then apparently remained at large in northern Italy. Frideric and Tufa eventually fell out, and Tufa was killed in a battle between Verona and Trento in 493.

The Eastern Roman empire invaded Ostrogothic Italy, initiating the long-running Gothic War (535–554). In 541, after the death of King Ildibad, no suitable Gothic candidate was found. A Rugian named Eraric was declared king by the Rugians and accepted by the Ostrogoths for a time. He was killed in the same year, supposedly having plotted to come to terms with the empire. The historian Walter Goffart described "this moment of leadership" as "the last Rugian gasp". He was replaced by the goth Totila, the nephew of Ildibad, who ruled 10 years before the final defeat of the Ostrogothic kingdom.

In the Middle Danubian region not only the Rugi, but also the Heruli and Lombards, eventually either entered Italy or merged into other peoples. The Middle Danubian region itself came under the control of the Pannonian Avars, who were newcomers from the east, and the region became largely Slavic-speaking.

== Continued use of the Rugii name ==
In the early Middle Ages, the name of the Rugi continued to be used both to refer to the Slavic people of Rügen, and to people from the old Rugiland in Lower Austria. There are also indications of the ongoing existence of one or more peoples with names similar to the Ulmerugi mentioned by Jordanes, who were possible relatives of the Rugi. The ninth-century Old English Widsith, a compilation of earlier oral traditions, mentions the tribe of the holm rycum (dative plural) without localizing it. A Norwegian people called the Holmrygir are mentioned in an Old Norse skaldic poem, Hákonarmál and maybe also in the Haraldskvæði.

The 8th century English writer Bede mentioned the "Rugini" in a list of peoples who lived in Germania "from whom the Angles or Saxons, who now inhabit Britain, are known to have derived their origin; for which reason they are still corruptly called "Garmans" by the neighbouring nation of the Britons". He listed the Frisians, the Rugini, the Danes, the "Huns" (Pannonian Avars in this period, whose influence stretched north to Slavic-speaking areas in central Europe), the "old Saxons" (antiqui Saxones), and the "Boructuari" who are presumed to be inhabitants of the old lands of the Bructeri, near the Lippe river. Whether these Rugini were remnants of the Rugii can only be speculated. However, scholars typically associate them with the medieval Slavic people of Rügen, the Rujani (or Rani).

The Latin word "Rugi" was also used to refer to a people from the region of Pomerania, also apparently the Rujani at Rügen. Widukind of Corvey listed the Ru[gi]ani among the Sclavi peoples who lived between the Elbe and Oder rivers. Later, Otto of Freising, who also described Odoacer as a Rugian, also used the term when mentioning that in 1135, Holy Roman Emperor Lothair III demanded that the "duke of the Poles" should pay homage to him for the Pomeranians and Rugians (Pomeranis et Rugis).

The name of the Rugi continued to be used from the 10th century onwards in the lower Austrian area, but this was apparently also used to refer to Slavic-speaking people. The Raffelstetten customs regulations mentions traders who were Slavs from Bavaria (Bawari vel Sclavi istius patrie) who were clearly distinguished from Slavs coming from Bohemia and from the land of the Rugi (Sclavi vero, qui de Rugis vel de Boemannis mercandi). This land of the Rugi could have been a reference to the land where the Rugii once lived, which lies next to Bohemia, but the word could also be used to refer to early "Russia" or Kievan Rus'. Doubt about this is possible because the word Rugi was one of the many variant spellings sometimes used to refer to the Rus' people, who, as traders of slaves did have connections to this market. Adalbert of Trier, in his Continuatio Reginonis, referred to a queen of the Rus, as "regina Rugorum" under the year 959. Soon after, under 960, 961, 962 and 966 he used the term again to refer the Rus people and a bishop ordained for them.

== Bibliography ==
- Andersson, Thomas (2003), "Rugier § 1. Namenkundliches", Reallexikon der germanischen Altertumskunde, vol. 25 (2 ed.), Walter de Gruyter, pp. 452ff, ISBN 3-11-017733-1
- Christensen, Arne Søby (2002). Cassiodorus, Jordanes and the History of the Goths. Museum Tusculanum Press. ISBN 9788772897103.
- Goffart, Walter (2006). Barbarian Tides: The Migration Age and the Later Roman Empire. University of Pennsylvania Press. ISBN 978-0812200287.
- Heather, Peter (1998), "Disappearing and Reappearing Tribes", Strategies of Distinction. The Construction of Ethnic Communities, 300-800, Transformation of the Roman World, vol. 2, Brill, doi:10.1163/9789004609518_006
- Heather, Peter (2009). Empires and Barbarians: The Fall of Rome and the Birth of Europe. Oxford and New York: Oxford University Press. ISBN 978-0-19-989226-6.
- Liccardo, Salvatore (2023), "The Laterculus Veronensis"", Old Names, New Peoples: Listing Ethnonyms in Late Antiquity, Brill, pp. 37–97, doi:10.1163/9789004686601_004, ISBN 9789004686601
- Machajewski, Henryk (2003), "Pommern", Reallexikon der germanischen Altertumskunde, vol. 23, Walter de Gruyter, p. 282, ISBN 3-11-017535-5
- Malone, Kemp (1964). "An Anglo-Latin Version of the Hjađningavíg". Speculum. 39 (1): 35–44. JSTOR 2850127.
- Martindale, John R., ed. (1980). The Prosopography of the Later Roman Empire: Volume II, AD 395–527. Cambridge: Cambridge University Press. ISBN 0-521-20159-4.
- Martindale, John R., ed. (1992). The Prosopography of the Later Roman Empire: Volume III, AD 527–641. Cambridge: Cambridge University Press. ISBN 0-521-20160-8.
- Mühle, Eduard (2023), Slavs in the Middle Ages between Idea and Reality, East Central and Eastern Europe in the Middle Ages, 450-1450, vol. 89, Brill, doi:10.1163/9789004536746_009, ISBN 9789004536746
- Pohl, Walter (2003), "Rugier § 2. Historisches", in Beck, Heinrich; Geuenich, Dieter; Steuer, Heiko (eds.), Reallexikon der Germanischen Altertumskunde, vol. 25 (2 ed.), ISBN 978-3-11-017733-6
- Steinacher, Roland (2017), Rom und die Barbaren. Völker im Alpen- und Donauraum (300-600), Kohlhammer Verlag, ISBN 9783170251700
- Udolph, Jürgen (2003), "Rügen § 1. Namenkundliches", in Beck, Heinrich; Geuenich, Dieter; Steuer, Heiko (eds.), Reallexikon der Germanischen Altertumskunde, vol. 25 (2 ed.), Gruyter, pp. 417–420, ISBN 978-3-11-017733-6
- Van den Bercken, William (1996), "The Christianisation of Russia in the Tenth Century: a Unique Missiological Story", Exchange, 25 (3): 261–284, doi:10.1163/157254396X00396
- Wolfram, Herwig (2005). The Roman Empire and Its Germanic Peoples. University of California Press. ISBN 9780520244900.
- Zehetmayer, Roman (2019), "The Austrian Danube Region in the Decades Around 900", The Fall of Great Moravia, East Central and Eastern Europe in the Middle Ages, 450-1450, vol. 54, translated by Barbara; Juch, Brill, pp. 39–61, doi:10.1163/9789004392878_003, ISBN 9789004392878
