= Eugippius =

Ecclesiastical writer and abbot venerated as a saint

Eugippius (circa 460 – circa 535, Castellum Lucullanum) was a disciple and the biographer of Saint Severinus of Noricum.

== Biography ==
After the latter's death in 482, he took the remains to Naples and founded a monastery on the site of a 1st-century Roman villa, the Castellum Lucullanum (on the site of the later Castel dell'Ovo).

In 511 Eugippius wrote to Paschasius and asked his venerated and dear friend, who had great literary skill, to write a biography of St. Severinus from the accounts of the saint which he (Eugippius) had put together in crude and inartistic form. Paschasius, however, replied that the acts and miracles of the saint could not be described better than had been done by Eugippius.

While at Naples, Eugippius compiled a 1000-page anthology of the works of St. Augustine and was probably involved in the revision of the Vulgate text of the Gospels. He also produced other scholarly works of high quality. There is a monastic rule which is ascribed to Eugippius, but it was early superseded by that of St. Benedict.

He wrote the earliest historical evidence for a monastic community in San Marino when recorded that another monk had lived in a monastery in the area.

== Sources ==
- Rajko Bratoz Rajko (1993). "Eugippio," (in Italian), in: Dizionario Biografico degli Italiani, Volume 43 (1993).
- Knoell, Pius (ed.). Eugippii opera. Pars II: Eugipii vita Sancti Severini. (in Latin). Wien: C. Gerold 1886.
- Gometz, Abigail Kathleen. Eugippius of Lucullanum: A Biography. Leeds: University of Leeds (Institute for Medieval Studies), 2008.
- Robinson, George W. (1914). The Life of Saint Severinus, By Eugippius. Cambridge Ma.: Harvard UP 1914.
- Eugippius at the University of Evansville
