= Peter Heather =

British historian

- Born: Peter Heather; 8 June 1960 (age 66); Northern Ireland

Academic background
- Education: Maidstone Grammar School; New College, Oxford (MA, DPhil)
- Thesis: The Goths and the Balkans (1987)
- Academic advisors: John Matthews; James Howard-Johnston
- Influences: Edward Gibbon; E. A. Thompson

Academic work
- Discipline: History
- School or tradition: Oxford School
- Institutions: Worcester College, Oxford; Yale University; University College London; King's College London
- Main interests: Late Antiquity

Peter John Heather (born 8 June 1960) is a British historian of late antiquity and the Early Middle Ages. Heather holds the statutory Chair of Medieval History in the Department of History at King's College London. He specialises in the fall of the Western Roman Empire and the Goths, on which he for decades has been considered a leading authority.

== Biography ==
Heather was born in Northern Ireland on 8 June 1960. He was educated at Maidstone Grammar School, and received his M.A. and D.Phil. from New College, Oxford. Among his teachers at Oxford were John Matthews and James Howard-Johnston. Heather subsequently lectured at Worcester College, Oxford, Yale University and University College London. In January 2008, Heather was appointed professor of medieval history at King's College London.

== Research ==
As a historian, Heather specialises in late antiquity and the Early Middle Ages, especially the relationships between the Roman Empire and "barbarian" peoples, and on the ethnicity of Germanic peoples. His extensive works on the Goths are considered as some of the best available on the subject.

In his earliest works, Heather mostly rejected the Getica of Jordanes as a valuable source on early Gothic history. In later years, as a result of advances in archaeology, Heather has largely retreated from that position, and now considers the Getica to be partially based on Gothic traditions, and that the archaeological evidence confirms a Gothic origin on the Baltic.

Heather disagrees with the core-tradition (German: Traditionskern) theory pioneered by the Vienna School of History, which contends that Germanic tribes were constantly changing, multi-ethnic coalitions held together by a small warrior elite. Instead, Heather contends that it was the freemen who constituted the backbone of Germanic tribes, and that the ethnic identity of tribes such as the Goths was stable for centuries, being held together by the freemen.

Heather has written several works on the fall of the Western Roman Empire. Contrary to several historians of the late 20th century, Heather contends that it was the movements of "barbarians" in the Migration Period which led to the collapse of the Western Roman Empire. He accepts the traditional view that it was the arrival of the Huns on the Pontic steppe in the late 4th century which set these migrations in motion. Heather's approach differs from many of his predecessors in the late 20th century, who have tended to downplay the importance migration played in the fall of the Western Roman Empire. Guy Halsall groups Heather together with Neil Christie and E. A. Thompson as being among the so-called Movers, who trace the collapse of the Western Roman Empire to external migration. These are contrasted with the Shakers, including Patrick Amory and Jean Durliat, who trace the collapse to internal developments within the empire, and contend that the barbarians were wilfully but peacefully integrated into the empire by the Romans. The Movers and Shakers are largely divided, as the Germanists and Romanists were in the early 20th century. According to Heather, the idea that the invading barbarians were peacefully absorbed into Roman civilisation "smells more of wishful thinking than likely reality".

Along with Bryan Ward-Perkins and other scholars affiliated with the University of Oxford, Heather belongs to a new generation of historians who beginning in the early 2000s started to challenge theories on Late Antiquity that had been prevalent since the 1970s. These older theories generally denied the importance of ethnic identity, barbarian migrations and Roman decline in the collapse of the Western Roman Empire. According to Andrew Gillet, Heather's works have been championed by (especially British) academics as a "new, definitive narrative" on the fall of Rome.

== Reception ==
Peter Heather has been criticised by members of the Toronto School of History. Michael Kulikowski, who is sometimes associated with this group, has said Heather promotes a "neo-Romantic vision of mass migrations of free Germanic peoples" and wishes "to revive a biological approach to ethnicity". According to Kulikowski, Heather "comes perilously close to recreating the old, volkisch notion of an inherent "Germanic" belief in freedom." On the other hand, Kulikowski has praised Heather for his works on Gothic history, calling him "the most subtle modern interpreter of Gothic history."

Guy Halsall has identified Peter Heather as the leader of a "counter-revisionist offensive against more subtle ways of thinking" about the Migration Period. Halsall accuses this group, which is associated with the University of Oxford, of "bizarre reasoning" and of purveying a "deeply irresponsible history". Halsall writes that Heather and the Oxford historians have been responsible for "an academic counter-revolution" of wide importance, and that they deliberately provide "succour" to far-right extremists such as Anders Behring Breivik. Similar criticism has been levelled by Andrew Gillett, another associate of the Toronto School, who laments Heather's "biological" approach and lists Heather's research as an "obstacle" to the advance of multicultural values.

== Selected works ==
- Peter Heather, The Goths and the Balkans, A.D. 350-500. University of Oxford DPhil thesis 1987.
- Peter Heather and John Matthews, The Goths in the Fourth Century. Liverpool: Liverpool University Press, 1991.
- Peter Heather, Goths and Romans 332-489. Oxford: Clarendon Press, 1991.
- Peter Heather, 'The Huns and the End of the Roman Empire in Western Europe', English Historical Review cx (1995): 4-41.
- Peter Heather, The Goths. Oxford: Blackwell Publishing, 1996.
- Peter Heather, ed. The Visigoths from the Migration Period to the Seventh Century: an ethnographic perspective. Woodbridge: Boydell, 1999.
- Peter Heather, 'The Late Roman Art of Client Management: Imperial Defence in the Fourth Century West', in The Transformation of Frontiers: From Late Antiquity to the Carolingians, eds. Walter Pohl, Ian Wood, and Helmut Reimitz. Leiden–Boston: Brill, 2001, pp. 15–68.
- Peter Heather, 'State, Lordship and Community in the West (c. AD 400-600)', in The Cambridge Ancient History, Volume xiv, Late Antiquity: Empire and Successors, A.D. 425-600, eds. Averil Cameron, Bryan Ward-Perkins, and Michael Whitby. Cambridge: Cambridge University Press, 2000, pp. 437–468
- Peter Heather, The Fall of the Roman Empire: a New History of Rome and the Barbarians. Oxford: Oxford University Press, 2005.
- Peter Heather, Empires and Barbarians: Migration, Development and the Birth of Europe. London: Macmillan, 2009.
- Peter Heather, The Restoration of Rome: Barbarian Popes and Imperial Pretenders. London–New York: Oxford University Press, 2014.
- Peter Heather, Rome Resurgent: War and Empire in the Age of Justinian. Oxford University Press, 2018.
- Peter Heather, Christendom: The Triumph of a Religion, AD 300-1300. Knopf, 2023.
- Peter Heather and John Rapley, Why Empires Fall: Rome, America, and the Future of the West. Yale University Press, 2023.

== Sources ==
- Gillett, Andrew (3 November 2017). "The fall of Rome and the retreat of European multiculturalism: A historical trope as a discourse of authority in public debate". Cogent Arts & Humanities. 4 (1). Taylor & Francis: ?. doi:10.1080/23311983.2017.1390915.
- Halsall, Guy (March 1999). "Review article: Movers and Shakers: the Barbarians and the Fall of Rome". Early Medieval Europe. 8 (1). John Wiley & Sons: 131–145. doi:10.1111/1468-0254.00041.
- Halsall, Guy (2007). Barbarian Migrations and the Roman West, 376–568. Cambridge University Press. ISBN 9781107393325.
- Halsall, Guy (December 2014). "Two Worlds Become One: A 'Counter-Intuitive' View of the Roman Empire and 'Germanic' Migration". German History. 32 (4). Oxford University Press: 515–532. doi:10.1093/gerhis/ghu107.
- Heather, Peter (2018). "Race, Migration And National Origins". History, Memory and Public Life. Routledge. pp. 80–100. ISBN 9781351055581.
- Humphries, Mark (2007). "Rome's Gothic Wars: From the Third Century to Alaric". Classics Ireland. 14. Classical Association of Ireland: 126–129. JSTOR 25528487.
- Kulikowski, Michael (2002). "Nation versus Army: A Necessary Contrast". In Gillett, Andrew (ed.). On Barbarian Identity: Critical Approaches to Ethnicity in the Early Middle Ages. ISD. pp. 69–85. ISBN 9782503511689.
- Kulikowski, Michael (2006). Rome's Gothic Wars: From the Third Century to Alaric. Cambridge University Press. ISBN 978-1139458092.
- Kulikowski, Michael (8 August 2011). "Peter Heather, Empires and Barbarians". Journal of Interdisciplinary History. 42 (2). MIT Press: 277–279. doi:10.1162/JINH_r_00217.
- Meier, Mischa (2019). Geschichte der Völkerwanderung. Europa, Asien und Afrika vom 3. bis zum 8. Jahrhundert. C.H. Beck. ISBN 9783406739590.
- Murdoch, Brian (2004). "Origo Gentis: The Literature of Germanic Origins". In Murdoch, Brian; Read, Malcolm (eds.). Early Germanic Literature and Culture. Boydell & Brewer. pp. 149–170. ISBN 157113199X.
- Wood, Ian (2013). The Modern Origins of the Early Middle Ages. OUP Oxford. ISBN 9780191654770.
- "Peter Heather". Gale Literature: Contemporary Authors. Gale. 2012.
- "Professor Peter Heather". King's College London.
- "Peter Heather". The Writer's Directory. St. James Press. 2018.
