= Roland Steinacher =

Austrian historian

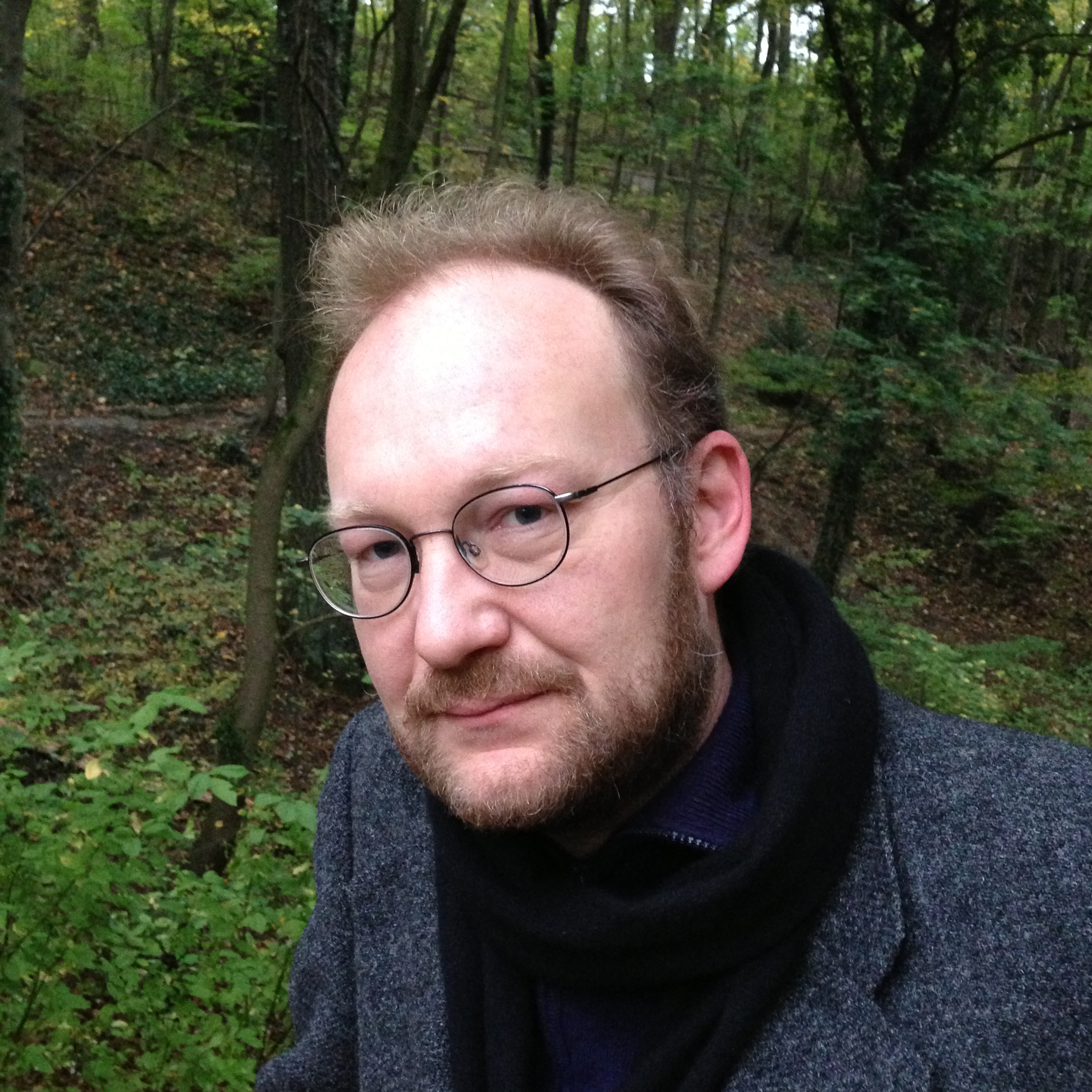
- Steinacher in 2014
- Born: 22 September 1972 (age 54); Innsbruck, Austria

Academic background
- Education: University of Vienna
- Doctoral advisor: Herwig Wolfram
- Other advisor: Walter Pohl
- Influences: Walter Goffart

Academic work
- Discipline: History
- Sub-discipline: Medieval Studies
- Institutions: University of Innsbruck
- Main interests: Ethnicity in Late Antiquity and the Early Middle Ages

Roland Steinacher (born 22 September 1972) is an Austrian historian who is Professor of Ancient History at the University of Innsbruck.

== Biography ==
Roland Steinacher was born in Innsbruck, Austria, on 22 September 1972. He received his PhD in history at the University of Vienna in 2002 under the supervision of Herwig Wolfram. Steinacher subsequently worked as a researcher at the University of Vienna and the Austrian Academy of Sciences. During this time, Steinacher was a research assistant for Walter Pohl at projects financed by the European Research Council. Steinacher received his habilitation at the University of Vienna in 2012. As fellow of the Gerda-Henkel-Stiftung, the Alexander von Humboldt Stiftung, the Alfried Krupp Wissenschaftskolleg Greifswald and the Berliner Antike-Kolleg he worked in Berlin, Erlangen, Greifswald and finally spent another year as an assistant professor at the University of Tübingen. In October 2018 he was appointed Professor of Ancient History at the University of Innsbruck.

== Theories ==
Steinacher is primarily interested in ethnicity in Europe during Late Antiquity and the Early Middle Ages. Steinacher adheres to Walter Goffart's theories on the Germanic peoples, whom Steinacher considers "nothing more but a vision of ancient literature". He believes that the Germani are a literary category without any basis in reality, which the Romans invented for political purposes. Steinacher utilizes scare quotes around the term "Germanic", and advocates replacing it with the term "barbarian". Steinacher contends that it is "impossible" to find any economic, social, religious, ethnic or political similarities among the "so-called "Germanic" peoples". According to Steinacher, there has "never" been a Germanic identity or Germanic culture. He stresses the fact that ancient sources after Caesar and Tacitus barely had a concept of "Germanic peoples" but continued to use the categories Celts and Scythians. Steinacher doubts that there was much migration of actual ethnic groups during the Migration Period. Instead he suggests that there were only military actions, a series of wars, partly Roman civil wars, as well as a long lasting movement of ethnic names.

In his “History of the Vandals/Die Vandalen”, published in 2016, Steinacher fathomed African and Vandalic history as a basis for studying the transformation of the Roman world, its consequences and implications. The transforming Roman Empire in the West had Vandal Africa, Frankish Gaul, or Visigothic Spain as successive political entities. Barbarian groups using ethnic labels act as specialized military service providers who seized the opportunity of the dissolution of Roman political structures. They made themselves independent, operated without Roman titles and orders, and under favorable circumstances succeeded in establishing their own kingdoms, which they could now shape according to their needs. This was because the new military elites aimed at controlling the Roman system of taxation and agricultural production. The takeover of Roman provinces and cities made it possible to provide long-term sustenance for the barbarian soldiers. Steinacher distinguished the Vandals as “Roman barbarians” stressing the need to understand 5th and 6th c. Africa as part of the late Roman world.

== Selected works ==
- Studien zur vandalischen Geschichte, 2002
- 'Die Vandalen. Aufstieg und Fall eines Barbarenreichs. Klett-Cotta, Stuttgart 2016 (2nd ed. 2017), ISBN 3-608-94851-1.
- Rom und die Barbaren. Völker im Alpen- und Donauraum (300–600). Kohlhammer, Stuttgart 2017, ISBN 3-17-025168-6.
- with Paolo Tedesco and Philipp Margreiter: Africa 500–1000. New Perspectives for Historical and Archaeological Research, Medieval Worlds 12 (2022).https://medievalworlds.net/medievalworlds_no16_2022?frames=yes
- Arianism. Roman heresy and barbarian creed (ed. with Guido M. Berndt). Ashgate, Farnham u. a. 2014, ISBN 1-4094-4659-X.
- Das Reich der Vandalen und seine (Vor-)Geschichten. Denkschriften. Österreichische Akademie der Wissenschaften, Philosophisch-Historische Klasse. Band 366 = Forschungen zur Geschichte des Mittelalters 13 (ed. with Guido M. Berndt). Verlag der Österreichischen Akademie der Wissenschaften, Wien 2008, ISBN 978-3-7001-3822-8.
- "Rome and its Created Northerners". In: ed. Matthias Friedrich/James M. Harland, Interrogating the Germanic: A Category and its Use in Late Antiquity and the Early Middle Ages. Reallexikon der Germanischen Altertumskunde – Ergänzungsband 123. Berlin/Boston 2019, pp. 31–66.
- "Transformation or Fall? Perceptions and Perspectives on the Transition from Late Antiquity to the Early Middle Ages". In: ed. Susanne Brather-Walter, Archaeology, History and Biosciences. Interdisciplinary Perspectives. Reallexikon der Germanischen Altertumskunde – Ergänzungsband 107. Berlin/Boston 2019, pp. 103–124.
- When not in Rome, still do as the Romans do? Africa from 146 BCE to the 7th century In: ed. Walter Pohl/Clemens Gantner/Cinzia Grifoni/Marianne Pollheimer-Mohaupt, Transformations of Romanness: Early Medieval Regions and Identities. Millennium-Studien/Millennium Studies 71, Berlin/Boston 2018, pp. 439–456.
- Who is the Barbarian? Considerations on the Vandal Royal Title. In: ed. Walter Pohl/Gerda Heydemann, Post-Roman Transitions: Christian and Barbarian Identities in the Early Medieval West. Cultural Encounters in Late Antiquity and the Middle Ages 14, Turnhout 2013, pp. 437–485.
- Migrations and Conquest. Easy pictures for complicated backgrounds in ancient and medieval structures. In: ed. Michi Messer/Renée Schröder/Ruth Wodak, Migrations: Interdisciplinary Perspectives. Wien 2012, pp. 239–249.
- The Heruls. Fragments of a History. In: ed. Florin Curta: Neglected Barbarians. Brepols, Turnhout 2010, pp. 321–364.
- The So-called Laterculus Regum Vandalorum et Alanorum: A part of Prosper Tiro’s chronicle?. In: ed. Andrew H. Merrills: Vandals, Romans and Berber New Perspectives on Late Antique North Africa. Aldershot 2004, pp. 163–180.

== Sources ==
- Steinacher, Roland (2014). "Migrations and Conquest". In Messer, Michi; Schroeder, Renée; Wodak, Ruth (eds.). Migrations: Interdisciplinary Perspectives. Springer. pp. 239–248. ISBN 978-3709109502.
- Steinacher, Roland (2017). Rom und die Barbaren: Völker im Alpen- und Donauraum (300-600) (in German). Kohlhammer Verlag. ISBN 978-3170251700.
- Steinacher, Roland (2010). "The Heruls. Fragments of a History". In Curta, Florin (ed.). Neglected Barbarians. Brepols. ISBN 9782503531250.
- Steinacher, Roland (2016). Die Vandalen. Aufstieg und Fall eines Barbarenreichs (in German). Klett-Cotta. p. 542. ISBN 978-3-608948516.
