= Walter Pohl =

Austrian historian (born 1953)

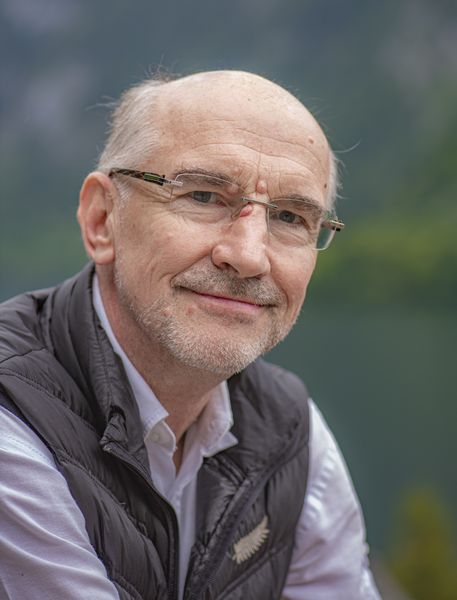
- Pohl in 2021
- Born: 27 September 1953 (age 73); Vienna, Austria

Academic background
- Education: University of Vienna (PhD, Dr. habil.)
- Doctoral advisor: Herwig Wolfram
- Influences: Reinhard Wenskus

Academic work
- Discipline: Medieval History
- School or tradition: Vienna School
- Institutions: University of Vienna; Austrian Academy of Sciences; European Science Foundation
- Main interests: Late Antiquity

Walter Pohl (born 27 December 1953) is an Austrian historian who is Professor of Auxiliary Sciences of History and Medieval History at the University of Vienna. He is a leading member of the Vienna School of History.

== Biography ==
Walter Pohl was born in Vienna, Austria, on 27 December 1953. He received his PhD at the University of Vienna in 1984 under the supervision of Herwig Wolfram with a thesis on the Pannonian Avars. He received his habilitation in medieval history at the University of Vienna in 1989.

Pohl is a leading member of the European Science Foundation and the recipient of a large number of grants from the European Research Council. He was a key member of the Transformation of the Roman World project. In 2004, Pohl was elected Director of the Institute for Medieval Studies and Member of the Austrian Academy of Sciences. In 2013, Pohl was elected a Member of Academia Europaea.

== Theories ==
Together with Wolfram, Pohl is a leading member of the Vienna School of History. However, he has a "much more fluid" approach on the issues than Wolfram or the latter's mentor Reinhard Wenskus. Pohl's theories are "profoundly influenced" by sociology, the philosophy of language and critical theory.

Pohl is well known for his theories about the Germanic peoples. He regards the category 'Germanic' as a primarily linguistic one, and doubts whether ethnicity is useful as a concept in analyzing the early Germanic peoples. Pohl treats the Germani strictly as a Roman construct existing from the 1st century BC to the 6th century AD. He does not consider language and culture as defining the Germani, and instead stresses fluidity, flexibility and ambiguity. He partly follows the ancient, contemporary, definitions of the Germani which did not include the Goths, Vandals and Merovingian Franks.

=== Criticism ===
Pohl's work has faced some opposition. Wolf Liebeschuetz called his work "extraordinarily one-sided" and a form of ideological "dogmatism" evincing "a closed mind", which he believed to be a reaction to Nazi racism. Liebeschuetz agrees with Pohl's view that the early Germanic peoples did not form a racial unit, but he opposed the increasingly popular idea among modern scholars such as Pohl that the early Germanic peoples had no single shared set of institutions or values of their own, because this idea conflicts with Liebeschuetz's belief that these peoples should be considered a single entity that made a major contribution to the emergence of Medieval Europe. John F. Drinkwater has suggested that Pohl's theories on Germanic peoples are motivated by a desire to accelerate European integration.

On the other hand, members of the Toronto School of History, led by Walter Goffart, have accused Pohl of not going far enough in his denials of the existence of a single continuous Germanic ethnicity in late antiquity. They charge Pohl and his colleagues at Vienna with perpetuating older German nationalist scholarship in an improved form. According to them, some of Pohl's theories on Germanic peoples are still ultimately derived from nineteenth-century germanische Altertumskunde, via scholars such as Otto Höfler, and have not changed significantly since Reinhard Wenskus. These charges have been denied by Pohl, who argues that ethnogenesis theory "has come a long way" since Wenskus, and that his own critique of Wenskus is in fact parallel to the critiques which are, in his view wrongly against him. As evidence of how far the Vienna ethnogenesis paradigm has changed, he wrote:

It was precisely Herwig Wolfram who underlined the Roman foundations of the Gothic kingdoms, contrary to the views held by Höfler, Schlesinger, and Wenskus. Patrick Geary's ‘mantra’ that ‘the Germanic world was perhaps the greatest and most enduring creation of Roman political and military genius’ sketches a new paradigm that is contrary to all that Höfler ever believed.

== Bibliography ==
Works in English translation. For a complete list see publications.

- Die Awaren. Ein Steppenvolk in Mitteleuropa 567 – 822 n. Chr. (2002). English translation in conjunction with Cornell:
  - Pohl, Walter (2018). The Avars: A Steppe Empire in Central Europe, 567–822. Ithaca and London: Cornell University Press. ISBN 978-1-5017-2940-9.
- Pohl, Walter (1995). Die Welt der Babenberger: Schleier, Kreuz und Schwert. Graz: Verlag Styria. ISBN 978-3-222-12334-4.
- Kingdoms of the Empire: The Integration of Barbarians in Late Antiquity (1997).
- Strategies of Distinction: The Construction of Ethnic Communities, 300–800 (1998).
- The Transformation of Frontiers: From Late Antiquity to the Carolingians (2000).
- Regna and Gentes: The Relationship Between Late Antique and Early Medieval Peoples and Kingdoms in the Transformation of the Roman World (2003).

== Sources ==
- Callander Murray, Alexander (2002), "Reinhard Wenskus on 'Ethnogenesis', Ethnicity, and the Origin of the Franks", in Gillett, Andrew (ed.), On Barbarian Identity: Critical Approaches to Ethnicity in the Early Middle Ages, Studies in the Early Middle Ages, vol. 4, ISD, pp. 39–68, doi:10.1484/M.SEM-EB.3.4483, ISBN 978-2-503-51168-9
- Drinkwater, John F. (2002). "W. Pohl, Die Germanen, 2000". Francia. 29 (1).
- Fruscione, Daniela (November 2010). "On "Germanic"". The Heroic Age (14). Memorial University of Newfoundland.
- Kulikowski, Michael (2002), "Nation versus Army: A Necessary Contrast?", in Gillett, Andrew (ed.), On Barbarian Identity: Critical Approaches to Ethnicity in the Early Middle Ages, Studies in the Early Middle Ages, vol. 4, ISD, pp. 69–84, doi:10.1484/M.SEM-EB.3.4484, ISBN 978-2-503-51168-9
- Gillett, Andrew, ed. (2002). On Barbarian Identity: Critical Approaches to Ethnicity in the Early Middle Ages. ISD. ISBN 978-2-503-51168-9.
- Halsall, Guy (2007). Barbarian Migrations and the Roman West, 376–568. Cambridge University Press. ISBN 978-1-107-39332-5.
- Liebeschuetz, Wolf (2015). East and West in Late Antiquity: Invasion, Settlement, Ethnogenesis and Conflicts of Religion. BRILL. ISBN 978-90-04-28952-9.
- Maas, Michael (2012). "Barbarians: Problems and Approaches". In Johnson, Scott Fitzgerald (ed.). The Oxford Handbook of Late Antiquity. Oxford University Press. pp. 60–91. ISBN 978-0-19-533693-1.
- Pohl, Walter (2002), "Ethnicity, Theory, and Tradition: A Response", in Gillett, Andrew (ed.), On Barbarian Identity: Critical Approaches to Ethnicity in the Early Middle Ages, Studies in the Early Middle Ages, vol. 4, ISD, pp. 221–239, doi:10.1484/M.SEM-EB.3.4490, ISBN 978-2-503-51168-9
