= Reinhard Wenskus =

German historian (1916–2002)

- Born: 10 March 1916; Saugen, East Prussia, Germany
- Died: 5 July 2002 (aged 86); Göttingen, Germany

Academic background
- Education: University of Marburg (PhD)
- Doctoral advisor: Helmut Beumann

Academic work
- Discipline: History
- Sub-discipline: Medieval History
- Institutions: University of Göttingen; Göttingen Academy of Sciences and Humanities
- Main interests: Germanic peoples; Prussia
- Notable works: Stammesbildung und Verfassung (1961)
- Notable ideas: Gentilismus; Traditionskern
- Influenced: Herwig Wolfram

Reinhard Wenskus (10 March 1916 – 5 July 2002) was a German historian who was Professor of Medieval History at the University of Göttingen. His theories on the identity of Germanic peoples have had a major influence on contemporary research by historians of late antiquity.

== Biography ==
Reinhard Wenskus was born in Saugen, East Prussia, Germany on 10 March 1916. After graduating from high school in Tilsit, East Prussia, Wenskus began working as a commercial apprentice there. He served as a soldier in the German Army during World War II. After the war, Wenskus gained his abitur in Hanover and subsequently studied history, ethnology and Germanistics at the University of Marburg. He received his PhD in 1954 under the supervision of Helmut Beumann. Wenskus subsequently worked as a research assistant, and gained his habilitation at Marburg in 1959 with the thesis Stammesbildung und Verfassung. He was subsequently appointed Docent at Marburg.

In 1963, Wenskus succeeded Percy Ernst Schramm as Professor of Medieval History at the University of Göttingen. He became a Member of the Göttingen Academy of Sciences and Humanities in 1969. Wenskus retired from Göttingen in 1981, but continued to teach and research. He died in Göttingen on 5 July 2002.

His daughter is the classical philologist Otta Wenskus.

== Research ==
Wenskus specialized in medieval history, particularly that of Prussia and the Teutonic Order, and the history, historiography and constitution of medieval Germanic peoples. Throughout his career, Wenskus was distinguished by his emphasis on interdisciplinary research. In addition to being a historian by profession, Wenskus was highly learned in linguistics, archaeology and ethnology, and sought to use evidence from these disciplines as a way to get a better understanding of history. Along with Herbert Jankuhn, Kurt Ranke, Hans Kuhn and Schramm, Wenskus was a co-founder of the second edition of the Reallexikon der Germanischen Altertumskunde, to which he contributed a large number of articles.

In his Stammesbildung und Verfassung (1961), Wenskus argued that Germanic peoples were not organized upon biological kinship, but instead based their identity upon being led by small warrior elite who maintained the core tradition (German: Traditionskern) of the tribe. He also theorized that the "barbarian" peoples of the Migration Period maintained ethnic identities distinguishing them from the Romance peoples, and referred to this ideology of "barbarian" ethnic identity as Gentilismus. Wenskus' ideas have been highly influential on modern understanding on "barbarian" identity. It contributed to the development of the ethnogenesis concept, and the emergence of the Vienna School of History.

== Selected works ==
- Studien zur historisch-politischen Gedankenwelt Bruns von Querfurt, 1956
- Stammesbildung und Verfassung, 1961
- Sächsischer Stammesadel und fränkischer Reichsadel, 1976

== See also ==
- E. A. Thompson
- Walter Goffart
- Walter Pohl
- Peter Heather

== Sources ==
- Beck, Heinrich (2006). "Wenskus". In Beck, Heinrich; Geuenich, Dieter; Steuer, Heiko (eds.). Reallexikon der Germanischen Altertumskunde (in German). Vol. 33. Walter de Gruyter. pp. 454–457. ISBN 3110183889.
