= Michael Kulikowski =

American historian (born 1970)

- Born: September 3, 1970 (age 56)

Academic background
- Education: Rutgers University (BA); University of Toronto (MA, PhD)
- Doctoral advisor: T. D. Barnes
- Influences: Walter Goffart

Academic work
- Discipline: History
- School or tradition: Toronto School
- Institutions: University of Tennessee; Pennsylvania State University
- Main interests: Late Antiquity

Michael Kulikowski (born September 3, 1970) is an American historian. He is a professor of history and classics and the head of the history department at Pennsylvania State University. Kulikowski specializes in the history of the western Mediterranean world of late antiquity. He is sometimes associated with the Toronto School of History and was a student of Walter Goffart.

== Biography ==
Kulikowski is a son of English-born computer engineer Casimir Alexander Kulikowski, and a grandson of the Polish-born inventor Victor Kulikowski. At an early age, he aspired to be a French Floutist. Then, he took his interest in World History in another direction, in another country - first Canada, then the USA. He received his BA (1991) from Rutgers University, and his MA (1992) and PhD (1998) from the University of Toronto. He also gained a Licentiate of Mediaeval Studies (canon law) from the Pontifical Institute of Mediaeval Studies in 1995. At the University of Toronto, Kulikowski was a student of Walter Goffart. Among his fellow students of Goffart were Andrew Gillett. After gaining his PhD, which was completed not with Walter Goffart, but with T. D. Barnes, Kulikowski taught at Washington and Lee University, Smith College, and the University of Tennessee. Since 2009, Kulikowski has been Professor of History and Classics and Head of the History Department at Pennsylvania State University.

Kulikowski's first book, Late Roman Spain and Its Cities, was published in 2004. He next work, Rome's Gothic Wars, was published in 2006, and is an introductory textbook on the relations between Goths and the Roman Empire in the 3rd and 4th centuries AD. In his review, Bryan Ward-Perkins described it as a "sensible, clear and uncontroversial introduction to the subject, which deserves to be included on any student reading-list" (alongside Peter Heather's "different take on the same events") which "does indeed introduce the reader to the problems of evidence, and, above all, to the essence of modern debate".

Kulikowski is the author of numerous articles, which range from the dependability of the Notitia Dignitatum as a historical source or ethnic self-identifications to examination of the careers of various late Roman individuals and the problem of the Germanic as a historical category in late antiquity. He is the editor of the forthcoming Landmark Ammianus Marcellinus.

== Theories ==
Kulikowski is sometimes seen as a member of the so-called Toronto School of History, which is associated with his former professor Walter Goffart. Kulikowski advocates against discussing Germanic-speaking peoples as an ethnic unit and replacing the term "Germanic" with "barbarian".

In Rome's Gothic Wars (2006), Kulikowski argues that the history of the Goths cannot be reliably traced earlier than the 3rd century AD. He argues that scholarly attempts to discover archaeological or linguistic evidence for earlier Gothic history all depend on the portrayal in the 6th-century Getica by Jordanes.

According to Kulikowski, the Goths were mostly of non-Gothic descent, being a population formed from a "large number of [non-Gothic] indigenes and a small number of [Gothic] migrants under the pressure of Roman imperialism, and in the shadow of the Empire". He argues that Gothic and other Barbarian identity was formed in response to Roman categories. Kulikowski argues that the history of the Goths and other "barbarians" should be "understood entirely as a response to Roman imperialism".

Like Goffart, Kulikowski has been critical of the popular ethnogenesis theory associated the Vienna School of History, and in the English-speaking world with Patrick Geary, and to some extent Peter Heather, which proposes that a Gothic ethnicity formed several times around noble families who carried a single Gothic tradition. He considers it "a way to bring long-distance migration from the Germanic north in by the back door". On the other hand, he has written that the Viennese theory "has undoubtedly killed off essentialist views of barbarian tribal identity, an excellent result". Kulikowski charges that old German nationalist and even Nazi influences continue to influence scholarship on the Goths up to the present day, particularly through the theories of Gustav Kossinna. He considers much of what is written about Goths to be "Germanist fantasy" derived from this legacy. He writes that Heather in particular "comes perilously close to recreating the old, volkisch notion of an inherent "Germanic" belief in freedom."

== Selected works ==
- Late Roman Spain and Its Cities, Johns Hopkins University Press, 2004
- Rome's Gothic Wars: From the Third Century to Alaric, Cambridge University Press, 2006
- The Triumph of Empire: The Roman World from Hadrian to Constantine, Harvard University Press, 2016
- The Tragedy of Empire: From Constantine to the Destruction of Roman Italy, Harvard University Press, 2019

== Sources ==
- Gillett, Andrew (2003). Envoys and Political Communication in the Late Antique West, 411–533. Cambridge University Press. ISBN 1139440039.
- Humphries, Mark (2007). "Rome's Gothic Wars: From the Third Century to Alaric". Classics Ireland. 14. Classical Association of Ireland: 126–129. JSTOR 25528487.
- Kulikowski, Michael (2002). "Nation versus Army: A Necessary Contrast". In Gillett, Andrew (ed.). On Barbarian Identity: Critical Approaches to Ethnicity in the Early Middle Ages. ISD. pp. 69–85. ISBN 9782503511689.
- Kulikowski, Michael (2006). Rome's Gothic Wars: From the Third Century to Alaric. Cambridge University Press. ISBN 978-1139458092.
- Kulikowski, Michael (August 8, 2011). "Peter Heather, Empires and Barbarians". Journal of Interdisciplinary History. 42 (2). MIT Press: 277–279. doi:10.1162/JINH_r_00217.
- Kulikowski, Michael (2004). Late Roman Spain and Its Cities. JHU Press. ISBN 978-0801899492.
- Kulikowski, Michael (2009). "Edward James. Europe's Barbarians, AD 200–600". The American Historical Review. 115 (4). American Historical Association: 1201–1202. doi:10.1086/ahr.115.4.1201.
- Ward-Perkins, Bryan (November 2009). "Kulikowski, Rome's Gothic Wars from the Third Century to Alaric". Journal of Roman Studies. 99. Society for the Promotion of Roman Studies: 296–297. doi:10.3815/007543509789744846.
