= Migration Period =

European historical period, c. 300-600 CE

Invasions of the Roman Empire
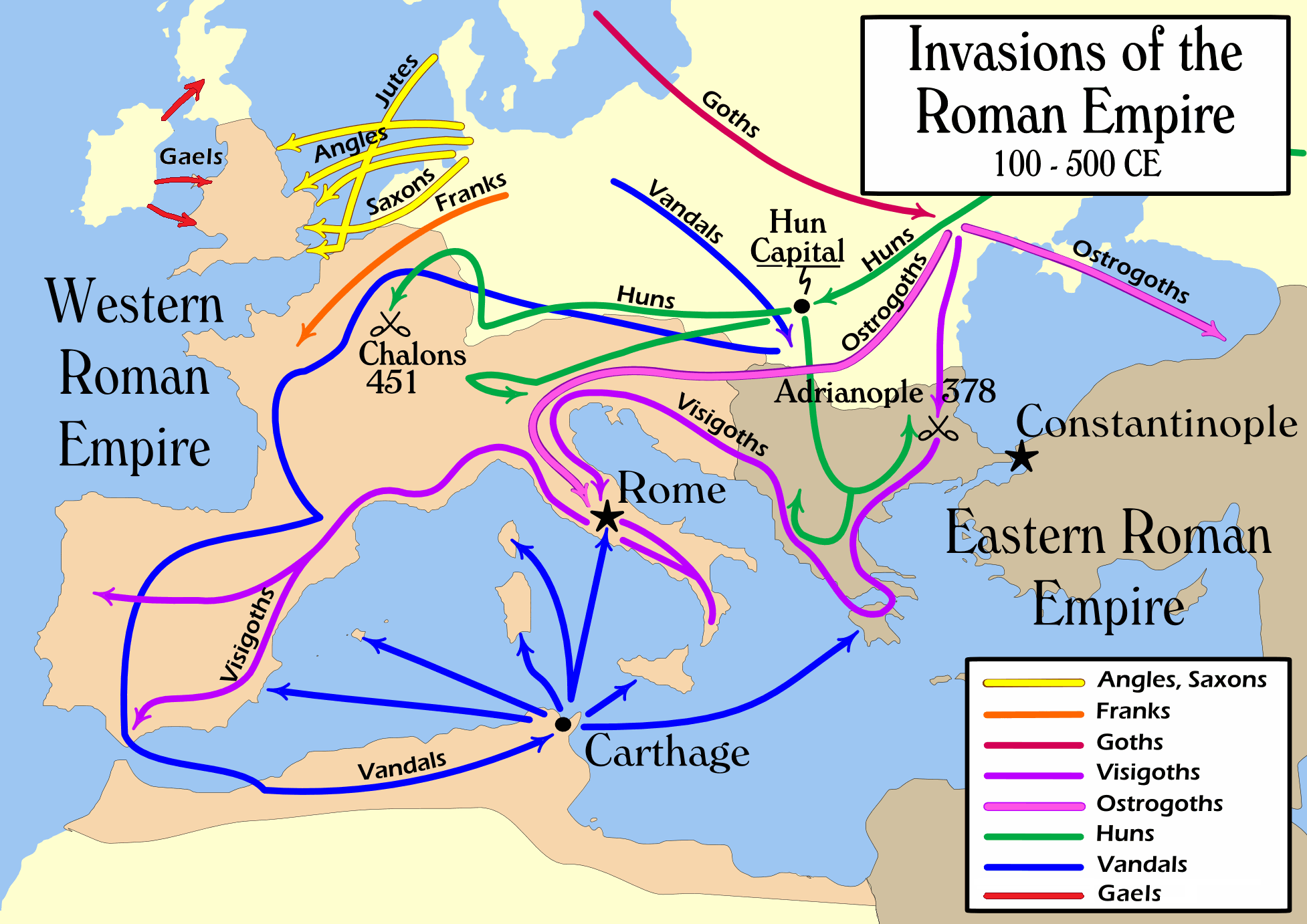
- Barbarian invasions, 100–500 AD
- Time: 300–800 AD (greatest estimate)
- Place: Europe and the Mediterranean region
- Event: Tribes invading the declining Roman Empire

The Migration Period (c. 300 to 600 AD), also known as the Barbarian Invasions, was a period in European history and late antiquity marked by large-scale migrations that saw the fall of the Western Roman Empire and subsequent settlement of its former territories by various tribes, and the establishment of post-Roman kingdoms there.

The term refers to the important role played by the migration, invasion, and settlement of various tribes, notably the Burgundians, Vandals, Goths, Alemanni, Alans, Huns, early Slavs, Pannonian Avars, Bulgars, and Magyars, within Europe as a whole and the Western Roman Empire in particular. Historiography traditionally takes the period as beginning in AD 375 (possibly as early as 300) and ending in 568. Various factors contributed to this phenomenon of migration and invasion, and their role and significance are still widely discussed.

Historians differ as to the dates for the beginning and ending of the Migration Period. The beginning of the period is widely regarded as the invasion of Europe by the Huns from Asia in about 375, and the ending with the Lombards' conquest of Italy in 568, but a more loosely set period extends from as early as 300 to as late as 800. For example, during the third century both Franks and Alemanni moved into neighbouring parts of Roman Gaul. In 406, a particularly large crossing of the Rhine was made by an armed group including Vandals, Alans, and Suebi. As central power broke down in the Western Roman Empire, the Roman military became more important but was dominated by men of barbarian origin.

There are contradictory opinions as to whether the fall of the Western Roman Empire was a result of an increase in migrations, or if both the breakdown of central power and the increased importance of non-Romans created additional internal factors. Migrations, and the use of non-Romans in the military, were known in the periods before and after, and the Eastern Roman Empire adapted and continued to exist until the fall of Constantinople to the Ottomans in 1453. The fall of the Western Roman Empire, although it involved the establishment of competing barbarian kingdoms, was to some extent managed by the Eastern emperors.

Individual migrating groups varied considerably in size, from war bands of a few thousand to entire tribal groups numbering over 100,000. Modern estimates suggest the Gothic crossing of the Danube in 376 brought 90,000–200,000 people into the Empire; the Rhine crossing of 406 involved a coalition of Vandals, Alans, and Suebi estimated at up to 200,000 people; and the Ostrogoths under Theodoric numbered 100,000–200,000 when they invaded Italy in 489. Estimates for the Anglo-Saxon migration to Britain range from 20,000 to 200,000, while the Lombard invasion of Italy in 568 has been estimated at around 150,000. Estimates for other groups, such as the Franks, Burgundians, or Slavs, are difficult to determine due to their more gradual or dispersed settlement patterns. According to the preceding estimates, total migration into Roman territory during the Migration Period could have ranged from roughly 500,000 to over 1,000,000 people.

The first migrations of peoples (German: Völkerwanderungen) were made by Germanic tribes such as the Goths (including the Visigoths and the Ostrogoths), the Vandals, the Anglo-Saxons, the Lombards, the Suebi, the Frisii, the Jutes, the Burgundians, the Alemanni, the Sciri, and the Franks; some of these groups were later pushed westward by the Huns, the Avars, the Slavs and the Bulgars. Later invasions—such as those carried out by the Vikings, the Normans, the Varangians, the Hungarians, the Arabs, the Turks, and the Mongols—also had significant effects on Roman and ex-Roman territory (especially in North Africa, the Iberian Peninsula, Anatolia and Central and Eastern Europe).

== Chronology ==
=== Germanic tribes prior to migration ===
When they first came to the attention of Roman authors, Germanic peoples were living near the Elbe, and to its north and east, but they had been pressing westward and southward, taking control of areas which had been Celtic, approaching the Rhine and coming into conflict with the Romans in Gaul, as described for example by Julius Caesar (100–44 BC). During the first century, Germanic peoples came to dominate the regions between the Rhine and Elbe, as described by writers such as Strabo, Pliny the Elder and Tacitus. In the late second century the power of the some of the most powerful of them was crushed by the Romans in the Marcomannic Wars, which had a major effect on the region. During the long period of Roman weakness known as the Crisis of the Third Century, powerful new groupings of peoples formed near the Roman borders, using new names such as the Alemanni, Franks, Saxons, and Goths. During the same period, the Roman Empire lost full control of several major regions on the European boundaries including Dacia, the regions east of the Middle Rhine, and the Rhine delta.

=== First wave ===
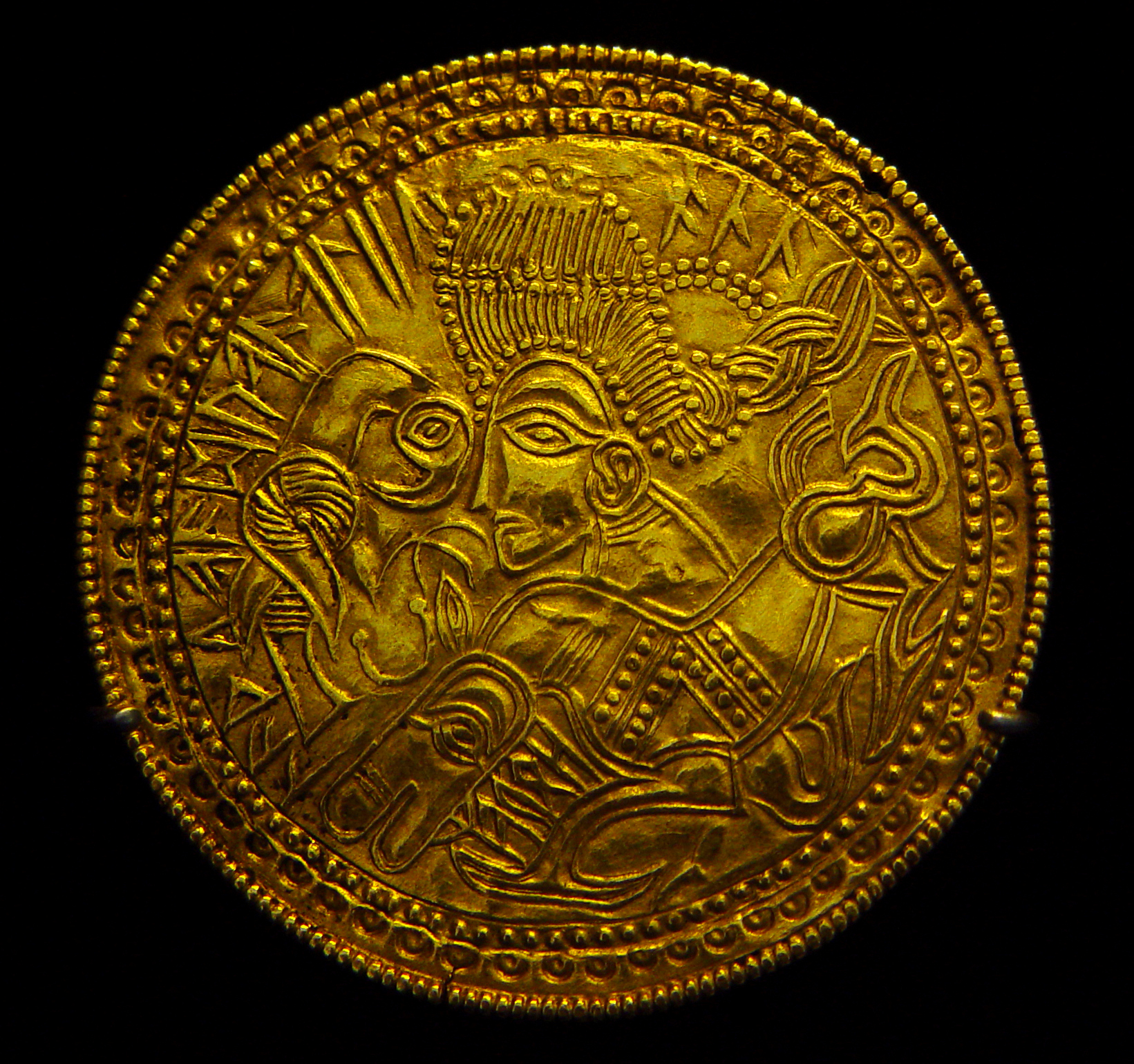
A Migration Period Germanic gold bracteate depicting a bird, horse, and stylized human head with a Suebian knot

The first wave of invasions, between AD 300 and 500, is partly documented by Greek and Latin historians but is difficult to verify archaeologically. It puts Germanic peoples in control of most areas of what was then the Western Roman Empire.

The Tervingi crossed the Danube into Roman territory in 376, in a migration fleeing the invading Huns. Some time later in Marcianopolis, the escort to their leader Fritigern was killed while meeting with Roman commander Lupicinus. The Tervingi rebelled, and the Visigoths, a group derived either from the Tervingi or from a fusion of mainly Gothic groups, eventually invaded Italy and sacked Rome in 410 before settling in Gaul. Around 460, they founded the Visigothic Kingdom in Iberia. They were followed into Roman territory first by a confederation of Herulian, Rugian, and Scirian warriors under Odoacer, that deposed Romulus Augustulus in 476, and later by the Ostrogoths, led by Theodoric the Great, who settled in Italy.

In Gaul, the Franks (a fusion of western Germanic tribes whose leaders had been aligned with Rome since the 3rd century) entered Roman lands gradually during the 5th century, and after consolidating power under Childeric and his son Clovis's decisive victory over Syagrius in 486, established themselves as rulers of northern Roman Gaul. Fending off challenges from the Alemanni, Burgundians, and Visigoths, the Frankish kingdom became the nucleus of what would later become France and Germany.

The initial Anglo-Saxon settlement of Britain occurred during the 5th century, when Roman control of Britain had come to an end. The Burgundians settled in northwestern Italy, Switzerland and Eastern France in the 5th century.

=== Second wave ===
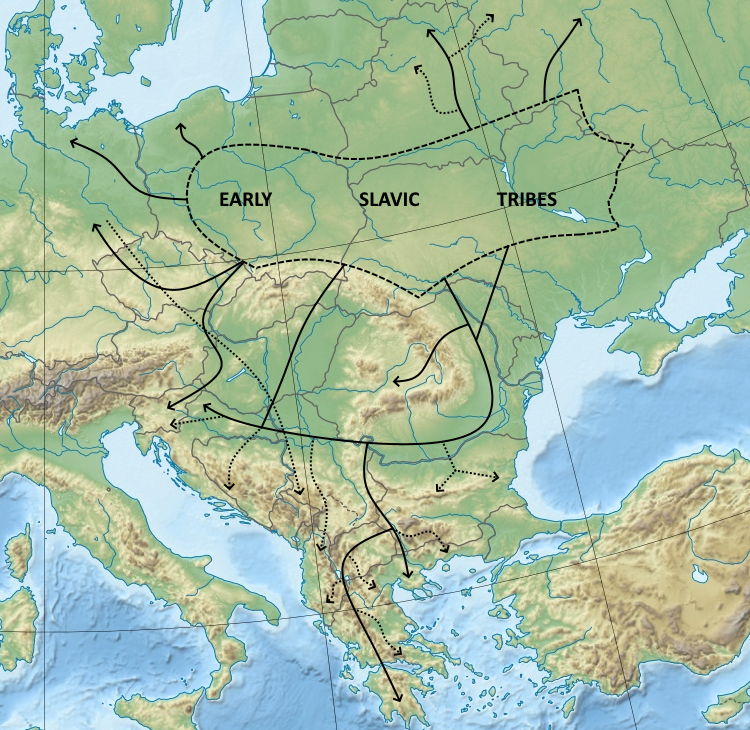
Migration of early Slavs in Europe in the 6th–7th centuries

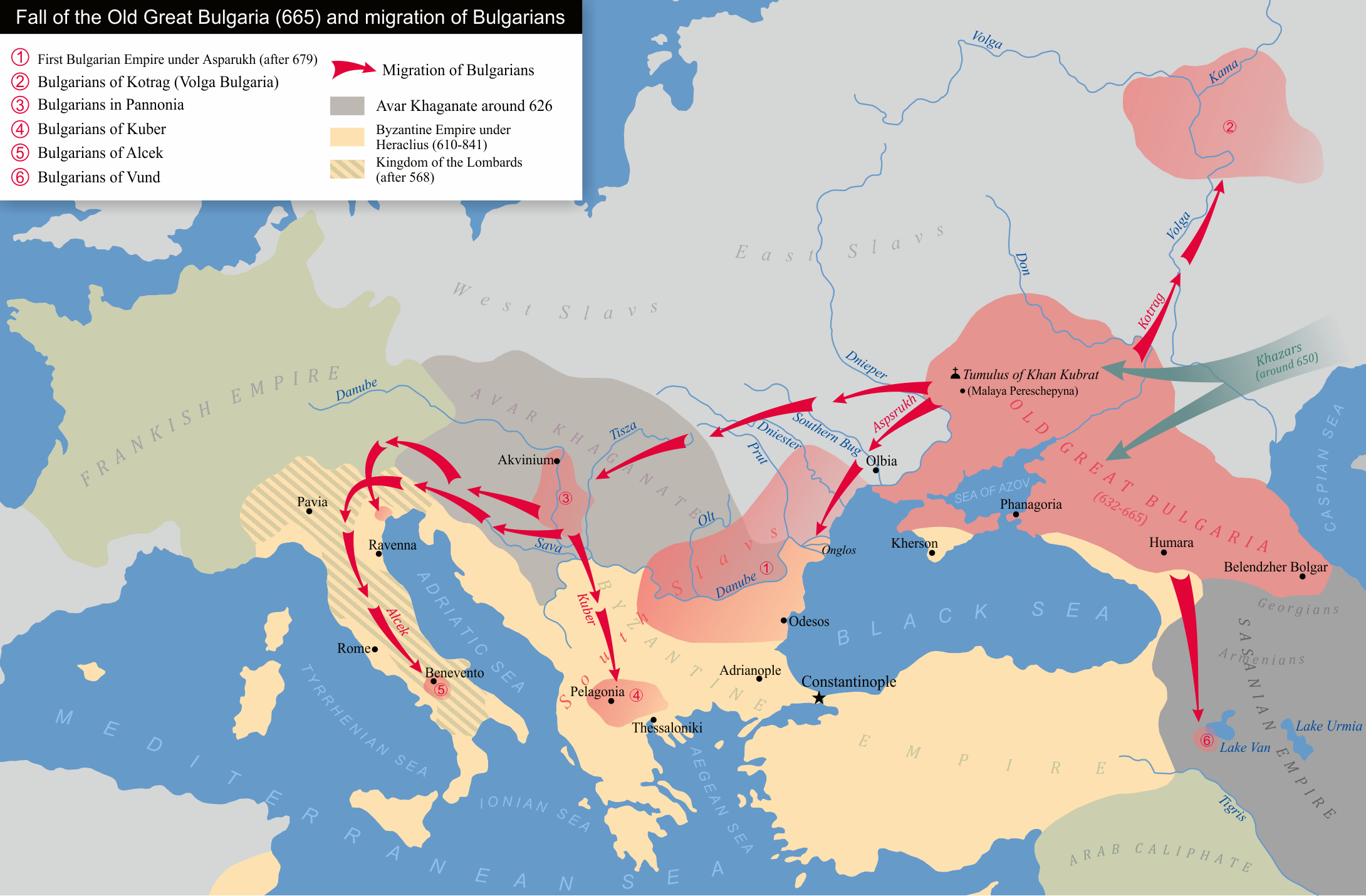
Migration and settlement of the Bulgars during the 6th–7th centuries AD

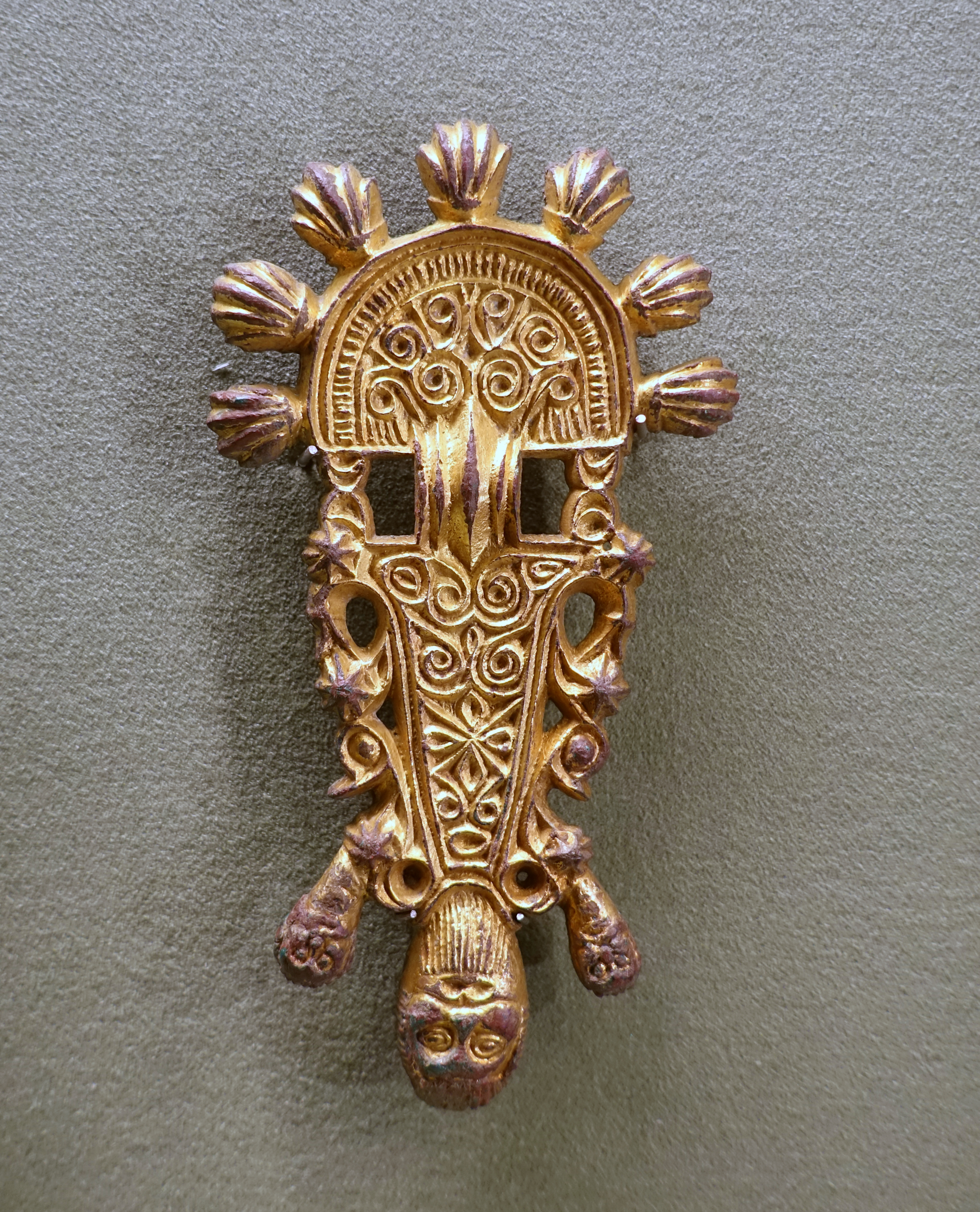
Slavic fibula brooch made of copper dating back to the Migration Period, c. 600–650 AD

Between AD 500 and 700, Slavic tribes settled more areas of central Europe and pushed farther into southern and eastern Europe, gradually making the eastern half of Europe predominantly Slavic-speaking. Additionally, Turkic tribes such as the Avars and, later, Ugric-speaking Magyars became involved in this second wave. In AD 567, the Avars and the Lombards destroyed much of the Gepid Kingdom. The Lombards, a Germanic people, settled in Italy with their Herulian, Suebian, Gepid, Thuringian, Bulgar, Sarmatian and Saxon allies in the 6th century. They were later followed by the Bavarians and the Franks, who conquered and ruled most of the Italian peninsula.

The Bulgars, originally a nomadic group probably from Central Asia, occupied the Pontic steppe north of Caucasus from the 2nd century. Later, pushed by the Khazars, the majority of them migrated west and dominated Byzantine territories along the lower Danube in the 7th century. From that time the demographic picture of the Balkans changed permanently, becoming predominantly Slavic-speaking, while pockets of native people survived in the mountains of the Balkans.

Croats settled in modern Croatia and Western Bosnia and Herzegovina while the Serbs settled in Southwestern Serbia, Eastern Bosnia and Herzegovina and parts of modern Montenegro. By the mid seventh century, Serb tribes were invading northern Albania. By the ninth century, the central Balkans and the area of southern and central Albania became invaded and settled by Bulgars.

During the early Byzantine–Arab Wars, Arab armies attempted to invade southeast Europe via Asia Minor during the late 7th and early 8th centuries but were defeated at the siege of Constantinople (717–718) by the joint forces of Byzantium and the Bulgars. During the Khazar–Arab Wars, the Khazars stopped the Arab expansion into Europe across the Caucasus (7th and 8th centuries). At the same time, the so-called Moors (consisting of Arabs and Berbers) invaded Europe via Gibraltar (conquering Hispania from the Visigothic Kingdom in 711), before being halted by the Franks at the Battle of Tours in Gaul. These campaigns led to broadly demarcated frontiers between Christendom and Islam for the next millennium. The following centuries saw the Muslims successful in conquering most of Sicily from the Christians by 902.

The Hungarian conquest of the Carpathian Basin from around AD 895 and the subsequent Hungarian invasions of Europe and the Viking expansion from the late 8th century conventionally mark the last large migration movements of the period. Christian missionaries from the Roman West and Byzantium gradually converted the non-Islamic newcomers and integrated them into Christendom.

== Discussions ==
=== Barbarian identity ===
Analysis of barbarian identity and how it was created and expressed during the Barbarian Invasions has elicited discussion among scholars. Herwig Wolfram, a historian of the Goths, in discussing the equation of migratio gentium with Völkerwanderung, observes that Michael Schmidt introduced the equation in his 1778 history of the Germans. Wolfram observed that the significance of gens as a biological community was shifting, even during the early Middle Ages, and that "to complicate matters, we have no way of devising a terminology that is not derived from the concept of nationhood created during the French Revolution".

The "primordialistic" paradigm prevailed during the 19th century. Scholars, such as German linguist Johann Gottfried Herder, viewed tribes as coherent biological (racial) entities, using the term to refer to discrete ethnic groups. He also believed that the Volk were an organic whole, with a core identity and spirit evident in art, literature and language. These characteristics were seen as intrinsic, unaffected by external influences, even conquest. Language, in particular, was seen as the most important expression of ethnicity. They argued that groups sharing the same (or similar) language possessed a common identity and ancestry. This was the Romantic ideal that there once had been a single German, Celtic or Slavic people who originated from a common homeland and spoke a common tongue, helping to provide a conceptual framework for political movements of the 18th and 19th centuries such as Pan-Germanism and Pan-Slavism.

From the 1960s, a reinterpretation of archaeological and historical evidence prompted scholars, such as Goffart and Todd, to propose new models for explaining the construction of barbarian identity. They maintained that no sense of shared identity was perceived by the Germani; a similar theory having been proposed for Celtic and Slavic groups.

A theory states that the primordialist mode of thinking was encouraged by a prima facie interpretation of Graeco-Roman sources, which grouped together many tribes under such labels as Germanoi, Keltoi or Sclavenoi, thus encouraging their perception as distinct peoples. Modernists argue that the uniqueness perceived by specific groups was based on common political and economic interests rather than biological or racial distinctions. Indeed, on this basis, some schools of thought in recent scholarship urge that the concept of Germanic peoples be jettisoned altogether.

The role of language in constructing and maintaining group identity can be ephemeral since large-scale language shifts occur commonly in history. Modernists propose the idea of "imagined communities": the barbarian polities in late antiquity were social constructs rather than unchanging lines of blood kinship. The process of forming tribal units was called "ethnogenesis", a term coined by Soviet scholar Yulian Bromley. The Austrian school (led by Reinhard Wenskus) popularized this idea, which influenced medievalists such as Herwig Wolfram, Walter Pohl and Patrick J. Geary. It argues that the stimulus for forming tribal polities was perpetuated by a small nucleus of people, known as the Traditionskern ("kernel of tradition"), who were a military or aristocratic elite. This core group formed a standard for larger units, gathering adherents by employing amalgamative metaphors such as kinship and aboriginal commonality and claiming that they perpetuated an ancient, divinely-sanctioned lineage.

The common, track-filled map of the Völkerwanderung may illustrate such [a] course of events, but it misleads. Unfolded over long periods of time, the changes of position that took place were necessarily irregular ... (with) periods of emphatic discontinuity. For decades and possibly centuries, the tradition bearers idled, and the tradition itself hibernated. There was ample time for forgetfulness to do its work.

=== Viewpoints ===
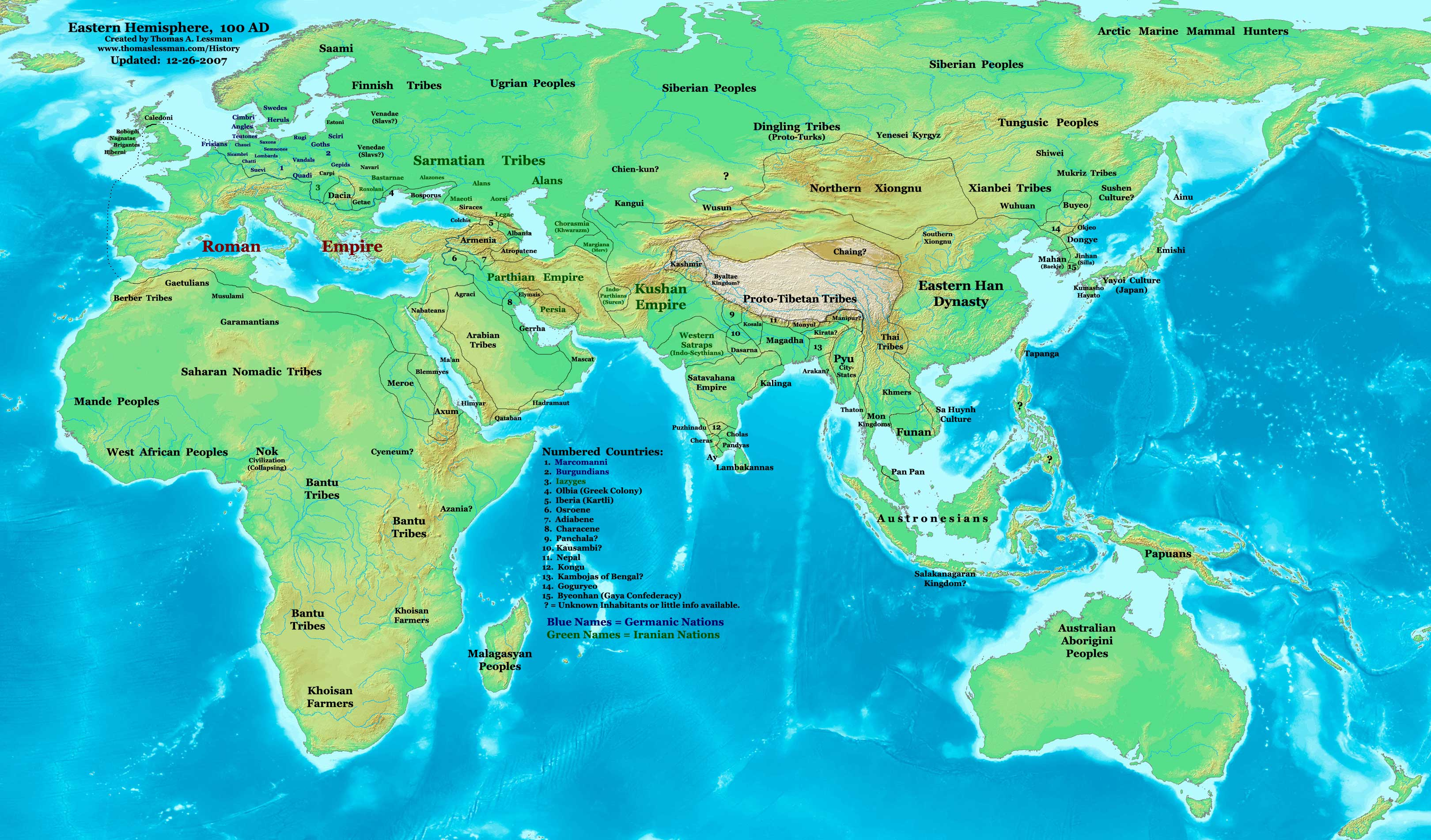
Location of Xiongnu and other steppe nations in 100 AD. Some historians believe that the Huns originated from the Xiongnu.

Völkerwanderung is a German word, borrowed from German historiography, that refers to the early migrations of the Germanic peoples. In a broader sense it can mean the mass migration of whole tribes or ethnic groups.

— Bell-Fialkoff, Andrew. The Role of Migration, p. 15

Rather than "invasion", German and Slavic scholars speak of "migration" (see German: Völkerwanderung, Czech: Stěhování národů, Swedish: folkvandring and Hungarian: népvándorlás), aspiring to the idea of a dynamic and "wandering Indo-Germanic people".

In contrast, the standard terms in French and Italian historiography translate to "barbarian invasions", or even "barbaric invasions" (French: Invasions barbares, Italian: Invasioni barbariche).

Historians have postulated several explanations for the appearance of "barbarians" on the Roman frontier: climate change, weather and crops, population pressure, a "primeval urge" to push into the Mediterranean, the construction of the Great Wall of China causing a "domino effect" of tribes being forced westward, leading to the Huns falling upon the Goths who, in turn, pushed other Germanic tribes before them. In general, French and Italian scholars have tended to view this as a catastrophic event, the destruction of a civilization and the beginning of a "Dark Age" that set Europe back a millennium. In contrast, German and English historians have tended to see Roman–Barbarian interaction as the replacement of a "tired, effete and decadent Mediterranean civilization" with a "more virile, martial, Nordic one".

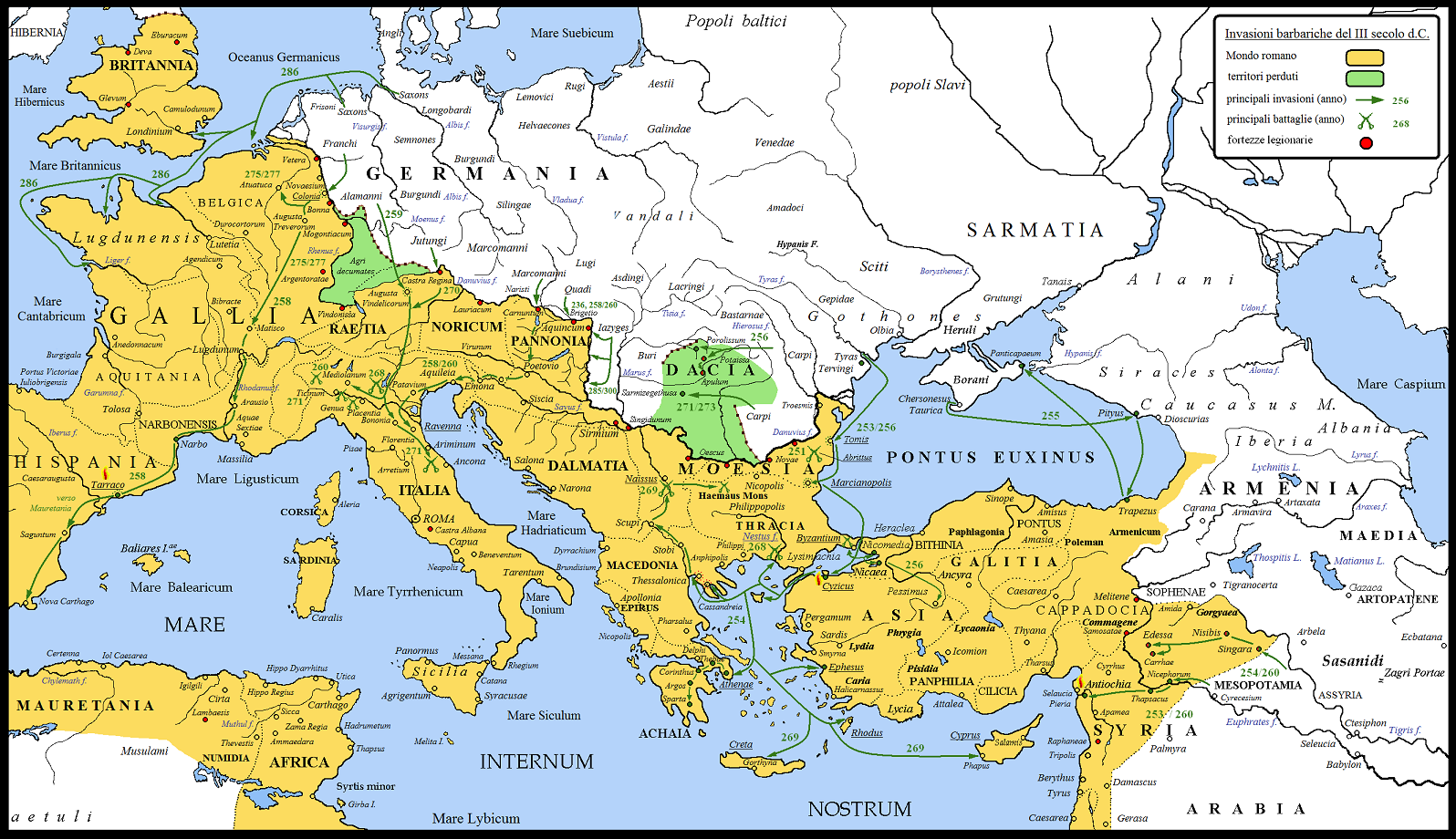
Barbarian invasions against the Roman Empire in the 3rd century

The scholar Guy Halsall has seen the barbarian movement as the result of the fall of the Roman Empire, not its cause. Archaeological discoveries have confirmed that Germanic and Slavic tribes were settled agriculturalists who were probably merely "drawn into the politics of an empire already falling apart for quite a few other causes". Goffart argues that the process of settlement was connected to hospitalitas, the Roman practice of quartering soldiers among the civilian population. The Romans, by granting land and the right to levy taxes to allied (Germanic) armies, hoped to reduce the financial burdens of the empire. The Crisis of the Third Century caused significant changes within the Roman Empire in both its western and its eastern portions. In particular, economic fragmentation removed many of the political, cultural and economic forces that had held the empire together.

The rural population in Roman provinces became distanced from the metropolis, and there was little to differentiate them from other peasants across the Roman frontier. In addition, Rome increasingly used foreign mercenaries to defend itself. That "barbarisation" parallelled changes within Barbaricum. To this end, noted linguist Dennis Howard Green wrote, "the first centuries of our era witness not merely a progressive Romanisation of barbarian society, but also an undeniable barbarisation of the Roman world."

For example, the Roman Empire played a vital role in building up barbarian groups along its frontier. Propped up with imperial support and gifts, the armies of allied barbarian chieftains served as buffers against other, hostile, barbarian groups. The disintegration of Roman economic power weakened groups that had come to depend on Roman gifts for the maintenance of their own power. The arrival of the Huns helped prompt many groups to invade the provinces for economic reasons.

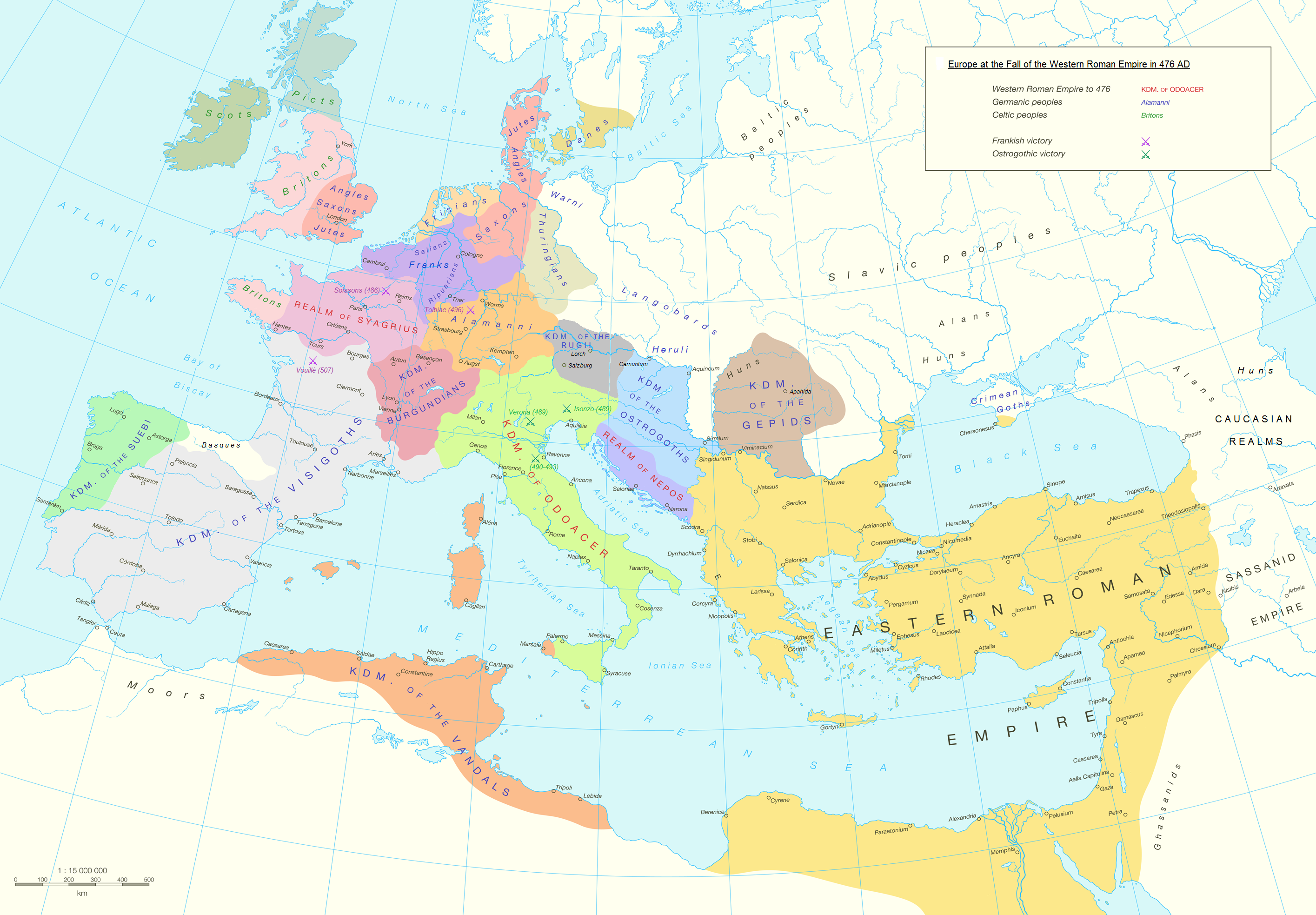
Barbarian kingdoms and peoples after the end of the Western Roman Empire in 476 AD

The nature of the barbarian takeover of former Roman provinces varied from region to region. For example, in Aquitaine, the provincial administration was largely self-reliant. Halsall has argued that local rulers simply "handed over" military rule to the Ostrogoths, acquiring the identity of the newcomers. In Gaul, the collapse of imperial rule resulted in anarchy: the Franks and Alemanni were pulled into the ensuing "power vacuum", resulting in conflict. In Hispania, local aristocrats maintained independent rule for some time, raising their own armies against the Vandals. Meanwhile, the Roman withdrawal from lowland England resulted in conflict between Saxons and the Brittonic chieftains (whose centres of power retreated westward as a result). The Eastern Roman Empire attempted to maintain control of the Balkan provinces despite a thinly-spread imperial army relying mainly on local militias and an extensive effort to refortify the Danubian limes. The ambitious fortification efforts collapsed, worsening the impoverished conditions of the local populace and resulting in colonization by Slavic warriors and their families.

Halsall and Noble have argued that such changes stemmed from the breakdown in Roman political control, which exposed the weakness of local Roman rule. Instead of large-scale migrations, there were military takeovers by small groups of warriors and their families, who usually numbered only in the tens of thousands. The process involved active, conscious decision-making by Roman provincial populations.

The collapse of centralized control severely weakened the sense of Roman identity in the provinces, which may explain why the provinces then underwent dramatic cultural changes even though few barbarians settled in them. Ultimately, the Germanic groups in the Western Roman Empire were accommodated without "dispossessing or overturning indigenous society", and they maintained a structured and hierarchical (but attenuated) form of Roman administration.

Ironically, they lost their unique identity as a result of such an accommodation and were absorbed into Latinhood. In contrast, in the east, Slavic tribes maintained a more "spartan and egalitarian" existence bound to the land "even in times when they took their part in plundering Roman provinces". Their organizational models were not Roman, and their leaders were not normally dependent on Roman gold for success. Thus they arguably had a greater effect on their region than the Goths, the Franks or the Saxons had on theirs.

=== Ethnicity ===
Based on the belief that particular types of artifacts, elements of personal adornment generally found in a funerary context, are thought to indicate the ethnicity of the person buried, the "Culture-History" school of archaeology assumed that archaeological cultures represent the Urheimat (homeland) of tribal polities named in historical sources. As a consequence, the shifting extensions of material cultures were interpreted as the expansion of peoples.

Influenced by constructionism, process-driven archaeologists rejected the culture-historical doctrine and marginalized the discussion of ethnicity altogether and focused on the intragroup dynamics that generated such material remains. Moreover, they argued that adoption of new cultures could occur through trade or internal political developments rather than only military takeovers.

== Depiction in media ==
- Dark Kingdom: The Dragon King, a 2004 television film depicting the Burgundians and Saxons.
- Attila (miniseries), a 2000 production that shows diplomacy and scheming between the Romans, Germans and Huns.
- Terry Jones' Barbarians, a four-part TV documentary series first broadcast on BBC 2 in 2006
- Rome: Total War: Barbarian Invasion and Total War: Attila, strategy video games by The Creative Assembly
- Barbarians, 2004 documentary miniseries on The History Channel
- Barbarians (2020 TV series), a 2020 series about the rebellion of Arminius against the Romans.

== See also ==
- Barbarian invasions of the 3rd century
- Bond event
- Dark Ages (historiography)
- Environmental migrant
- Five Barbarians and Sixteen Kingdoms
- Genetic history of the British Isles
- Germanic peoples
- Hephthalite Empire
- Immigration
- Late Antiquity
- Medieval demography
- Middle Ages
- Migration Period art
- Turkic migration

== Bibliography ==
- Barford, Paul M. (2001). The Early Slavs: Culture and Society in Early Medieval Eastern Europe. Cornell University Press. ISBN 0-8014-3977-9.
- Bell-Fialkoff, Andrew, ed. (2000). The Role of Migration in the History of the Eurasian Steppe: Sedentary Civilization vs. 'Barbarian' and Nomad (Role Migrant History Eurasian Step). Basingstoke: Macmillan. ISBN 978-1-349-61839-2.
- Börm, Henning (2013). Westrom. Von Honorius bis Justinian (in German). Stuttgart: Kohlhammer Verlag. ISBN 978-3-17-023276-1.
- Curta, Florin (2001). The Making of the Slavs: History and Archaeology of the Lower Danube Region, c. 500–700. Cambridge University Press. ISBN 978-1-139-42888-0.
- ——— (2006). Southeastern Europe in the Middle Ages, 500–1250. Cambridge University Press. ISBN 978-0-521-81539-0.
- Dumville, David (1990). Histories and pseudo-histories of the insular Middle Ages. Aldershot, Hampshire: Variorum.
- Friedrich, Matthias; Harland, James M., eds. (2020). Interrogating the 'Germanic': a category and its use in late antiquity and the early Middle Ages. Boston: De Gruyter. ISBN 978-3-11-069976-0.
- Geary, Patrick (2003). Myth of Nations. The Medieval Origins of Europe. Princeton University Press. ISBN 0-691-11481-1.
- ——— (2006). "The crisis of European identity". In Thomas F. X. Noble (ed.). From Roman Provinces to Medieval Kingdoms. New York and London: Routledge. ISBN 0-415-32742-3.
- Green, D. H. (1998). Language and history in the early Germanic world. Cambridge University Press. ISBN 978-0-521-79423-7.
- Halsall, Guy (2006a). "The Barbarian invasions". In Fouracre, Paul (ed.). The New Cambridge Medieval History, Vol. 1: c. 500 – c. 700. Cambridge University Press. ISBN 0-521-36291-1.
- ——— (2006b). "Movers and shakers: the barbarians and the fall of Rome". In Noble, Thomas F. X. (ed.). From Roman Provinces to Medieval Kingdoms. New York and London: Routledge. ISBN 0-415-32742-3.
- ——— (2008). Barbarian Migrations and the Roman West, 376–568. Cambridge University Press. ISBN 978-0-521-43491-1.
- Heather, Peter (1998). The Goths. Wiley-Blackwell. ISBN 0-631-20932-8.
- ——— (2006). "Foedera and foederati of the fourth century". In Noble, Thomas F. X. (ed.). From Roman Provinces to Medieval Kingdoms. New York and London: Routledge. ISBN 0-415-32742-3.
- Kleineberg, Andreas; Marx, Christian; Knobloch, Eberhard; Lelgemann, Dieter; Ptolemaeus, Claudius (2010). Germania und die Insel Thule: die Entschlüsselung von Ptolemaios' "Atlas der Oikumene" (in German). Darmstadt: WBG. ISBN 978-3-534-23757-9.
- Kulikowski, Michael (2007). Rome's Gothic Wars: From the Third Century to Alaric. Cambridge University Press. ISBN 978-0-521-84633-2.
- Noble, Thomas F. X., ed. (2006). From Roman Provinces to Medieval Kingdoms. Routledge. ISBN 0-415-32742-3.
- Pohl, Walter (1998). "Conceptions of Ethnicity in Early Medieval Studies". In Little, Lester K; Rosenwein, Barbara (eds.). Debating the Middle Ages: Issues and Readings. Wiley-Blackwell. ISBN 1-57718-008-9.
- Todd, Malcolm (1996). The Early Germans. Blackwell. ISBN 0-631-19904-7.
- Wolfram, Herwig (2001). Die Goten. Von den Anfängen bis zur Mitte des sechsten Jahrhunderts (in German). Munich: C. H. Beck.
- Wood, Ian (2006). "Defining the Franks: Frankish origins in early medieval historiography". In Noble, Thomas F. X. (ed.). From Roman Provinces to Medieval Kingdoms. New York and London: Routledge. ISBN 0-415-32742-3.
- Fine, John Van Antwerp Jr. (1991) [First published 1983]. The Early Medieval Balkans: A Critical Survey from the Sixth to the Late Twelfth Century. Ann Arbor, Michigan: University of Michigan Press. ISBN 0-472-08260-4.
