= Richard Bissell =

Richard Bissell may refer to:

- Richard M. Bissell Jr. (1909–1994), American CIA officer
- Richard Pike Bissell (1913–1977), American author and playwright

== See also ==
- Richard Bessel (born 1948), British historian
