= Herwig Wolfram =

Austrian historian (born 1934)

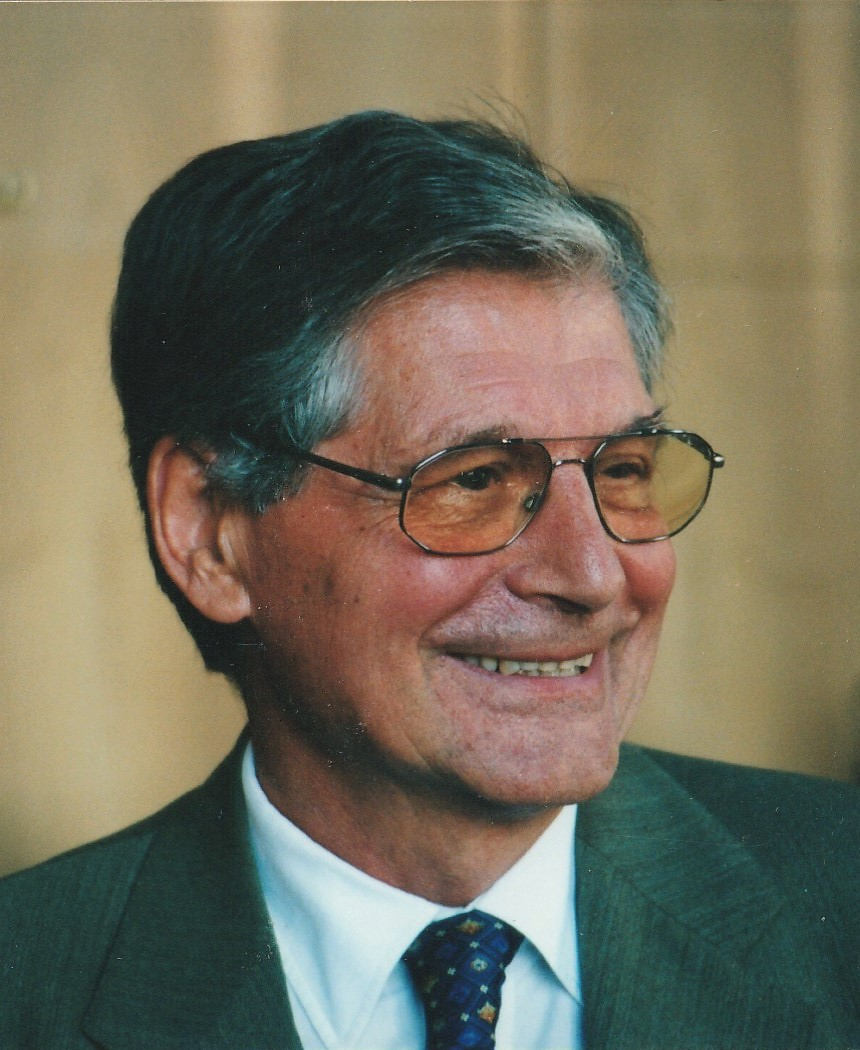
- Born: 14 February 1934 (age 92); Vienna, Austria

Academic background
- Education: University of Vienna (PhD, 1957; Dr. habil., 1966)
- Influences: Reinhard Wenskus

Academic work
- Discipline: Medieval history
- School or tradition: Vienna School
- Institutions: University of Vienna; Institute of Austrian Historical Research
- Doctoral students: Walter Pohl; Roland Steinacher
- Notable works: History of the Goths (1988); The Roman Empire and Its Germanic Peoples (1997)
- Notable ideas: Ethnogenesis; Traditionskern
- Influenced: Patrick J. Geary; Ian N. Wood

Herwig Wolfram (born 14 February 1934) is an Austrian historian who is Professor Emeritus of Medieval History and Auxiliary Sciences of History at the University of Vienna and the former Director of the Institute of Austrian Historical Research. He is a leading member of the Vienna School of History, and internationally known for his authoritative works on the history of Austria, the Goths, and relationships between the Germanic peoples and the Roman Empire.

== Biography ==
Herwig Wolfram was born in Vienna, Austria on 14 February 1934. He studied history and Latin at the University of Vienna since 1952, gaining a Ph.D. there in 1957. He subsequently served as University Assistant at the Institute of History at the University of Vienna (1959–1961) and the Institute of Austrian Historical Research (1962–1969). Wolfram gained his habilitation at the Faculty of Philosophy at the University of Vienna in 1966.

Wolfram was Visiting Professor at the University of California, Los Angeles from 1968 to 1969, and has subsequently made many visits to the United States. Since 1969, Wolfram was Professor of Medieval History and Auxiliary Sciences of History at the University of Vienna. From 1983 to 2002, Wolfram was also Director of the Institute of Austrian Historical Research. He was since retired from the University of Vienna as professor emeritus.

== Research ==
Wolfram is a leading figure in the Vienna School of History. His book History of the Goths (1979) has been translated into a number of languages and been published in several completely revised editions. It is considered the standard work on the Goths, and a work of large importance to the study of Germanic peoples in general. In the more recent editions of this work, Wolfram has adopted some of the controversial theories of Walter Goffart. Wolfram and Heather's books on the Goths are considered the foremost studies on the subject.

== Honours and awards ==
- Member of the Austrian Academy of Sciences
- Corresponding member of Monumenta Historica
- Corresponding member of the Medieval Academy of America
- Austrian Medal for Science and Art (2000)
- Cardinal Innitzer Prize (2011)
- Corresponding member of the Slovenian Academy of Sciences and Arts (2015)

== Select bibliography ==
Works in English translation. For a complete list see the German National Library

- History of the Goths, University of California Press, 1990. ISBN 0-520-06983-8
- The Roman Empire and Its Germanic Peoples, University of California Press, 1997. ISBN 0-520-08511-6
- Conrad II, 990-1039: Emperor of Three Kingdoms, Pennsylvania State University Press, 2006. ISBN 0-271-02738-X
