= Guy Halsall =

English historian (born 1964)

Guy Halsall FRHistS
- Born: 1964 (age 61–62); North Ferriby, Yorkshire, England

Academic background
- Education: King Charles I School
- Alma mater: University of York
- Thesis: Civitas Mediomatricorium: Settlement and social organisation in the Merovingian region of Metz (1990)
- Doctoral advisor: Edward James

Academic work
- Discipline: History
- Sub-discipline: Early Medieval Europe; Migration Period; Merovingian dynasty
- Institutions: University of Newcastle; Birkbeck, University of London; University of York

Guy Halsall FRHistS (born 1964) is an English historian, archaeologist and academic, specialising in Early Medieval Europe. He has published a number of books, essays, and articles on the subject of early medieval history and archaeology. Halsall's current research focuses on western Europe in the important period of change around AD 600. He taught at the University of Newcastle and Birkbeck, University of London, before moving to the University of York in 2003. In 2023, Halsall stepped down from his professorship at York. Since then, he has been an Honorary Research Professor at Durham University.

== Life ==
Guy Halsall was born in North Ferriby in 1964 and raised in Worcestershire. He studied archaeology and history at the University of York, earning the first First-Class degree from York's archaeology department in 1986. He completed his D.Phil. at York in 1991 with a thesis on the "history and archaeology of the region of Metz in the Merovingian period" supervised by Edward James and examined by Steve Roskams and Bryan Ward-Perkins.

== Career ==
In 1990 Halsall was awarded a postdoctoral research fellowship at the University of Newcastle. From 1991 to 2002 he was a permanent lecturer, and then reader, in early medieval history and archaeology at Birkbeck, University of London. In 2003 he moved to the University of York, and was promoted to a professorship there in 2006.

In December 2012, Halsall briefly attracted attention in the Times Higher Education after a University of York student newspaper, Nouse, published an intemperate message he had sent to students enrolled on an undergraduate course, concerning non-attendance at lectures.

In June 2013, Halsall was one of the signatories to an open letter criticising the proposed changes to the British history curriculum being implemented by Conservative Minister for Education Michael Gove. The letter expressed the opinion that the proposed reforms were "underpinned by an unbalanced promotion of partisan political views" in that they emphasised an Anglocentric "national triumphalism" and thus contravened the Education Acts of 1996 and 2002.

Halsall's doctoral students have included the late antique historians Catherine-Rose Hailstone and James M. Harland.

== Theories ==
Along with Walter Goffart, an important member of the Toronto School of History, Halsall argues that the fall of the Western Roman Empire should be traced to internal developments within the empire itself, and that the barbarians were absorbed into Roman civilization, on which they had minimal influence. Halsall argues against the existence of a unified ethnic culture for Germanic-speaking peoples, which he associates with 19th-century nationalism. (Note: "[T]here are many occasions where modern historians and, especially, archaeologists, treat the different Germanic-speaking groups as sharing some sort of unifying ethos... This may be claimed to be a reductio ad absurdam of traditional assumptions. It is, but only because these assumptions are fundamentally absurd.")

Halsall disagrees strongly with a group of historians associated with the University of Oxford, among whom Peter Heather is a leading member. This group contends that Germanic tribes had more stable ethnic identities than posited by many other scholars, and that the migrations of these peoples, facilitated by the expansion of the Huns, contributed significantly to the fall of the Western Roman Empire. Halsall traces these theories to Nazi influence, and fears that such theories may be used to strengthen racism and opposition to immigration. Halsall also contends that the Vienna School of History, although explicitly formed to combat Nazi influence in the study of Germanic peoples, has in fact based its theories upon Nazi theories, although this is not explicitly acknowledged by them.

The increased reliance on archaeogenetics in recent years has in the eye of Halsall led to a flourishing of pseudoscience, which threatens to reduce the concept of ethnicity "to something close to the nineteenth-century idea of race."

== Works ==
=== Authored books ===
- Worlds of Arthur: Facts and Fictions of the Dark Ages (Oxford: Oxford University Press, 2013)
- Cemeteries and Society in Merovingian Gaul: Selected Studies in History and Archaeology, 1992-2009 (Leiden: E. J. Brill, 2010).
- Barbarian Migrations and the Roman West, 376-568 (Cambridge: Cambridge University Press, 2007).
- Warfare and Society in the Barbarian West, 450-900 (London: Routledge, 2003).
- Early Medieval Cemeteries. An Introduction to Burial Archaeology in the Post-Roman West (Glasgow: Cruithne Press, 1995).
- Settlement and Social Organization. The Merovingian Region of Metz (Cambridge: Cambridge University Press, 1995).

=== Edited books ===
- (ed. with Wendy Davies and Andrew Reynolds) People and Space in the Middle Ages, 300–1300 (Turnhout: Brepols, 2006)
- (ed.) Violence and Society in the Early Medieval West (Woodbridge: Boydell, 1998).
- (ed.) Humour, History and Politics in Late Antiquity and the Early Middle Ages (Cambridge: Cambridge University Press, 2002).

=== Selected articles ===
- 'Nero and Herod? The death of Chilperic and Gregory of Tours' writing of history.' The World of Gregory of Tours, ed. K. Mitchell and I.N. Wood, (Brill; Leiden, 2002), pp. 337–50.
- 'Funny foreigners: Laughing with the barbarians in late antiquity.' Humour, History and Politics in Late Antiquity and the Early Middle Ages, ed. Halsall (see above), pp. 89–113.
- 'Childeric's grave, Clovis' succession and the origins of the Merovingian kingdom.' Society and Culture in Late Roman Gaul. Revisiting the Sources, ed. D. Shanzer & R. Mathisen (Aldershot, 2001), pp. 116–33.
- 'The Viking presence in England? The burial evidence reconsidered.' Cultures in Contact: Scandinavian Settlement in England in the Ninth and Tenth Centuries, ed. D.M. Hadley & J. Richards, (Brepols: Turnhout, 2000), pp. 259–76.
- 'Archaeology and the late Roman frontier in northern Gaul: The so-called Föderatengräber reconsidered.' Grenze und Differenz im früheren Mittelalter, ed. W. Pohl & H. Reimitz, (Österreichische Akadamie der Wissenschaften: Vienna, 2000), pp. 167–80.
- 'La Christianisation de la région de Metz à travers les sources archéologiques (5ème-7ème siècle): problèmes et possibilités.' L'Évangélisation des régions entre Meuse et Moselle et la Fondation de l'Abbaye d'Echternach (Ve-IXe siècle), ed. M. Polfer, (Linden: Luxembourg, 2000).
- 'Burial customs around the North Sea, c. AD 350–700.' Kings of the North Sea, AD 250–850, ed. E. Kramer, I. Stoumann & A. Greg (Newcastle, 2000), pp. 93–104.
- 'Review Article: Movers and Shakers: The Barbarians and the Fall of Rome.' Early Medieval Europe 8.1 (1999), pp. 131–45.
- 'Reflections on Early Medieval Violence: The example of the "Blood Feud".' Memoria y Civilización 2 (1999), pp. 7–29.
- 'Social identities and social relationships in Merovingian Gaul.' Franks and Alamanni in the Merovingian Period: An Ethnographic Perspective, ed. I.N. Wood, (Boydell: Woodbridge, 1998), pp. 141–65.
- 'Burial, ritual and Merovingian society.' The Community, the Family and the Saint: Patterns of Power in Early Medieval Europe, ed. J. Hill & M. Swan, (Brepols: Turnhout, 1998), pp. 325–38.
- 'Violence and society in the early medieval west: An introductory survey.' Violence and Society in the Early Medieval West, ed. Halsall, (see above), pp. 1–45.
- 'Archaeology and Historiography.' The Routledge Companion to Historiography, ed. M. Bentley, (Routledge: London, 1997), pp. 807–29.
- 'Female status and power in early Merovingian central Austrasia: the burial evidence.' Early Medieval Europe 5.1 (1996), pp. 1–24.
- 'Towns, societies and ideas: The not-so-strange case of late Roman and early Merovingian Metz.' Towns in Transition. Urban Evolution in Late Antiquity and the Early Middle Ages, ed. N. Christie & S.T. Loseby (Scolar: Aldershot, 1996), pp. 235–261.
- 'Playing by whose rules? A further look at Viking atrocity in the ninth century.' Medieval History vol.2, no.2 (1992), pp. 3–12.
- 'The origins of the Reihengräberzivilisation: Forty years on.' Fifth-Century Gaul: A Crisis of Identity? ed. J.F. Drinkwater & H. Elton, (C.U.P.: Cambridge, 1992), pp. 196–207.

== Sources ==
- Halsall, Guy (2007). Barbarian Migrations and the Roman West, 376–568. Cambridge University Press. ISBN 9781107393325.
- Halsall, Guy (2012). "Germani". In Silberman, Neil Asher (ed.). The Oxford Companion To Archaeology (2 ed.). Oxford University Press. ISBN 9780199739219.
- Halsall, Guy (December 2014). "Two Worlds Become One: A 'Counter-Intuitive' View of the Roman Empire and 'Germanic' Migration". German History. 32 (4). Oxford University Press: 515–532. doi:10.1093/gerhis/ghu107.
- Heather, Peter (2010). Empires and Barbarians: The Fall of Rome and the Birth of Europe. Oxford University Press. ISBN 9780199752720.
