= Vienna School of History =

School of history

The Vienna School of History is an influential school of historical thinking based at the University of Vienna. It is closely associated with Reinhard Wenskus, Herwig Wolfram and Walter Pohl. Partly drawing upon ideas from sociology and critical theory, scholars of the Vienna School have utilized the concept of ethnogenesis to reassess the notion of ethnicity as it applies to historical groups of peoples such as the Germanic tribes. Focusing on Late Antiquity and the Early Middle Ages, the Vienna School has a large publishing output, and has had a major influence on the modern analysis of barbarian identity.

== Theories ==
The origins of the Vienna School of History can be traced to the works of the German historian Reinhard Wenskus. During the 1960s, there was as reaction against previous scholarship on Germanic tribes. Drawing upon studies on modern tribes, Wenskus posited that the Germanic tribes of antiquity did not constitute distinct ethnicities, but were rather diverse alliances led by a dominant elite continuing "core-traditions" (Traditionskerne). Wenskus argued that members of the Germanic tribes were not necessarily related to each other by kin, but rather believed themselves to be.

More recent scholars associated with Wenskus in the Vienna School are Herwig Wolfram and Walter Pohl. Drawing on theories drawn from sociology and critical theory, scholars of the Vienna School introduced the concept of ethnogenesis (Stammesbildung) to deconstruct the ethnicity of Germanic tribes, proceeding from concept of ethnicity as a political unit and emphasizing the situationality of tribal ethnicities centered around a core of tradition. These scholars also emphasize that the influence of Germanic history extends beyond northern and western Europe. Wolfram points out the contribution of Germanic tribes to the histories of regions such as the Balkans and southern Europe in general, extending even to North Africa, in order to counter the view that Germanic history ought to be identified only with the Germans. (Note: "The Germanic peoples have left traces in large areas of Europe and around the Mediterranean, even where their languages have long ceased to be spoken. [...] The present-day Germans have as much a Germanic history as do the Scandinavians, British, Irish, French, Italians, Spaniards, Portuguese, Hungarians, Romanians, Slavic nations, Greeks, Turks, and even the Tunisians and Maltese... By naively equating Germanic peoples with the Germans... one loses not only the subject of "Germanic peoples" and their history but also history as such, and eventually oneself. The goal of the present book is to prevent this from happening.")

The ethnogenesis theories of the Vienna School have initiated a "revolution in historical approaches to early medieval ethnicity" and "overturned the foundations of earlier research into the ethnic groups of the early medieval period". It has since become the model with which "barbarian" ethnicity is analyzed. They have had an immense publication output. English-language scholars that have been influenced by the Vienna School include Patrick J. Geary, Ian N. Wood and Patrick Amory. However, Geary, Wood and Pohl approach the theories in "a more flexible manner" than Wenskus and Wolfram. Guy Halsall notes the favorable effect of these approaches on the study of late antique ethnicity, pointing out that Pohl's views on the mutability of ethnic identity run counter to prewar notions of ethnic essentialism which survive in some other modern scholarship.

== Criticism ==
=== Toronto School ===
Throughout the 1990s and 2000s, the issue of early medieval ethnic identity was hotly contested between the Vienna School and the so-called Toronto School, of whom University of Toronto professor Walter Goffart was a leading member. While the Vienna School considers Old Norse literature and works such as Getica by Jordanes to be of some value, this is completely rejected by the Toronto School. They consider these works to be artificial constructions entirely devoid from oral tradition. While neither of the schools are entirely homogeneous in their approach, discussions between the two schools have been characterized by an unusually intense passion and highly polemic dialogue. This has included accusations and insinuations by members of the Toronto school that members of the Vienna school relied on scholarship and ideas from the Nazi period or sympathized with ethnonationalists; such accusations were particularly strong in the 2002 volume On Barbarian Identity, containing essays by members of the Toronto School. As of 2020, however, the polemic has died down. James Harland and Matthias Friedrich write that "[b]roadly speaking, advocates of both camps have shared goals, and oppose the racist and ethnonationalist agendas which draw upon interpretations of the late antique world as an ideological resource".

=== British historians ===
British historian Peter Heather disagrees with both the core-tradition theory pioneered by the Vienna School, and the theories of the Toronto School. Heather contends that it was a freemen class between slaves and nobles who constituted the backbone of Germanic tribes, and that the ethnic identity of tribes such as the Goths was stable for centuries, being held together by these freemen. He traces the Fall of the Western Roman Empire to external migration triggered by the Huns in the late 4th century.

== Sources ==
- Ghosh, Shami (2015). Writing the Barbarian Past: Studies in Early Medieval Historical Narrative. BRILL. ISBN 9789004305816.
- Hakenbeck, Susanne (2015). Local, regional and ethnic identities in early medieval cemeteries in Bavaria. All’Insegna del Giglio. ISBN 9788878144323.
- Halsall, Guy (2007). Barbarian Migrations and the Roman West, 376–568. Cambridge University Press. ISBN 9781107393325.
- Halsall, Guy (December 2014). "Two Worlds Become One: A 'Counter-Intuitive' View of the Roman Empire and 'Germanic' Migration". German History. 32 (4). Oxford University Press: 515–532. doi:10.1093/gerhis/ghu107.
- Harland, James M.; Friedrich, Matthias (2020). "Introduction: The 'Germanic' and its Discontents". In Friedrich, Matthias; Harland, James M. (eds.). Interrogating the 'Germanic'. De Gruyter. pp. 1–18. doi:10.1515/9783110701623-003. S2CID 241474332.
- Harland, James M. (2021). Ethnic Identity and the Archaeology of the aduentus Saxonum. University of Amsterdam Press. ISBN 9789048544967.
- Heather, Peter (2018). "Race, Migration And National Origins". History, Memory and Public Life. Routledge. pp. 80–100. ISBN 9781351055581.
- Humphries, Mark (2007). "Rome's Gothic Wars: From the Third Century to Alaric". Classics Ireland. 14. Classical Association of Ireland: 126–129. JSTOR 25528487.
- Kulikowski, Michael (2002). "Nation versus Army: A Necessary Contrast". In Gillett, Andrew (ed.). On Barbarian Identity: Critical Approaches to Ethnicity in the Early Middle Ages. Isd. pp. 69–85. ISBN 9782503511689.
- Liebeschuetz, Wolf (2015). East and West in Late Antiquity: Invasion, Settlement, Ethnogenesis and Conflicts of Religion. BRILL. ISBN 978-90-04-28952-9.
- Roymans, Nico (2004). Ethnic Identity and Imperial Power: The Batavians in the Early Roman Empire. Amsterdam University Press. ISBN 9789053567050.
- Wolfram, Herwig (2005). The Roman Empire and Its Germanic Peoples. University of California Press. ISBN 9780520244900.
- Wood, Ian (2015). "Ian Wood, The Transformation of Late Antiquity 1971 – 2015". Networks and Neighbours.
