= Walter Goffart =

American historian and academic (1934–2025)

- Born: Walter André Goffart; February 22, 1934; Berlin, Germany
- Died: February 14, 2025 (aged 90); New Haven, Connecticut, U.S.
- Spouse: Roberta Frank (m. 1977)

Academic background
- Education: Harvard University (BA, MA, PhD); École normale supérieure
- Academic advisor: Charles Holt Taylor
- Influences: Dubos; Coulanges

Academic work
- Discipline: Medieval studies
- School or tradition: Toronto School of History
- Institutions: University of Toronto; Yale University
- Notable students: Andrew Gillett; Michael Kulikowski

Walter André Goffart (February 22, 1934 – February 14, 2025) was a German-born American historian who specialized in Late Antiquity and the European Middle Ages. He taught for many years as a professor at the University of Toronto and at the Centre for Medieval Studies from 1960 to 1999, and was a senior research scholar at Yale University. He was the author of monographs on a ninth-century forgery (Le Mans Forgeries), late Roman taxation (Caput and Colonate), four "barbarian" historians, and historical atlases.

Two controversial themes in his research concern the Roman policies used when settling barbarian soldiers in the West Roman Empire (Barbarians and Romans and the sixth chapter of Barbarian Tides), and his criticism of the old idea that there was a single Germanic people opposed to the empire in late antiquity, which he believed still influenced academics studying the period.

== Early life and education ==
Walter Goffart was born in Berlin on February 22, 1934, the son of Francis-Leo Goffart and Andree Steinberg. His father was a Belgian diplomat, while his mother, born in Cairo, had French and Romanian-Jewish parents.

Goffart and his family were in Belgrade, where his father was stationed, in 1941. Just before the German invasion of Yugoslavia, they fled on the Orient Express, passing through Istanbul, Beirut, Jerusalem, and Cairo. After 68 days at sea, they eventually reached New York City. Goffart became an American citizen in 1959.

Goffart received his B.A. (1955), M.A. (1956), and Ph.D. (1961) from Harvard University. From 1957 to 1958, he attended the École normale supérieure in Paris.

== Career ==
Goffart became a lecturer at the University of Toronto in 1960. He was made an assistant professor in 1963. In 1965–1966 he was a visiting assistant professor of history at the University of California, Berkeley. He was appointed an associate professor at the University of Toronto in 1966, and a full professor in 1971. In 1967–1968 he was a visiting fellow at the Institute for Advanced Study in Princeton. In 1971–1972 he was the acting director of the Centre for Medieval Studies, Toronto. In 1973–1974 Goffart was a visiting fellow at the Dumbarton Oaks Center for Byzantine Studies. He retired from the University of Toronto as a professor emeritus in 1999. Since 2000, he was a senior research scholar in history at Yale University. In 2001 he had a residency at the Rockefeller Foundation study center in Bellagio and in 2015 at the Bogliasco Foundation, Genoa.

In 1982, Goffart became a fellow of the Medieval Academy of America; he was a councilor there in 1977–78. In 1996 he was elected a Fellow of the Royal Society of Canada and was made a Corresponding Fellow of the Royal Historical Society, London. Goffart was a fellow of the American Council of Learned Societies in 1973–74, and a Guggenheim fellow in 1979–80. He was a member of the International Society of Anglo-Saxonists, the American Historical Association, and the Haskins Society.

In 1991 he received the Haskins Medal of the Medieval Academy of America, for his book, The Narrators of Barbarian History (A.D. 550–800). Alexander C. Murray edited a Festschrift for Goffart called After Rome's Fall: Narrators and Sources of Early Medieval History (1999).

== Theories on Barbarians and the Fall of Rome ==
Goffart was known as a strong critic of several traditional assumptions which are still common in history writing about the late Roman empire and the early middle ages. He objects to terminology such as "Migration age", and "Germanic peoples", arguing that both these concepts presuppose old assumptions about a single systematic movement against the Romans.

The peoples living to the north of these borders [Roman frontiers from about 370 A.D.] were not newcomers. Some had been settled there for as many as four centuries, others for less but all for long enough to consider themselves well rooted. They were long past the point of having "come" from somewhere and were definitely not "going" anywhere.

Goffart also argued that the use of terms like "German" and "Germanic" to refer to all northern European barbarians in late antiquity has had serious implications for the understanding of events, implying that there was a one-to-one confrontation of Germanic barbarians against Roman civilization. However, even if the barbarians spoke languages in the same family there is no evidence of their being united in any non-linguistic way. Instead, the barbarians "existed in small fragmented groups and had no mechanism for united action".

Among his more detailed theories was the idea that the Western Roman Empire did not collapse as such, but settled "barbarians" using older Roman systems for accommodating military units. To the extent that they were greedy and oppressive, Goffart argued that it was "in the finest tradition of the law-abiding Roman countryside [...] it created rural tyrants".

Goffart stressed Roman continuity after the fall of the Western Roman Empire, arguing that the "Germans" are first found in the Carolingian age, when a tradition of having a separate king for Frankish-ruled territories east of the Rhine started.

More recently, the concept of a "Germanic" proto-Europe spread from Germanic studies to early medieval European studies, and was "recast in terms borrowed from constructionist anthropological approaches to ethnicity" into a "vision of an early Europe that was culturally and politically committed to ethnic politics", and Goffart criticized this trend in Barbarian Tides (2006), a work which was "more explicitly concerned than the earlier books with the historiographic framework that has shaped modern interpretations of the period".

== Personal life and death ==
Goffart had two children, Vivian and Andrea, from his first marriage, and one granddaughter, Eva. He had been married to Roberta Frank, a medievalist, since 1977. He died in New Haven, Connecticut on February 14, 2025, at the age of 90.

== Selected bibliography ==
- "Byzantine Policy in the West under Tiberius II and Maurice: The Pretenders Hermenegild and Gundovald (579–585)", in Traditio 13 (1957), pp. 73–118
- "The Fredegar Problem reconsidered", in Speculum. A Journal of Medieval Studies 38:2 (1963), pp. 206–41.
- The Le Mans Forgeries (1966)
- "Le Mans, St. Scholastica, and the Literary Tradition of the Translation of St. Benedict," Revue Bénédictine 77 (1967), pp. 107–41.
- Caput and Colonate (1974)
- Barbarians and Romans, A.D. 418–584: The Techniques of Accommodation (1980)
- "Hetware and Hugas: Datable Anachronisms in Beowulf", in The Dating of Beowulf, ed. Colin Chase (1981), pp. 83–100.
- "Rome, Constantinople, and the Barbarian", in American Historical Review 86:2 (1981), pp. 275–306.
- The Narrators of Barbarian History (A.D. 550–800): Jordanes, Gregory of Tours, Bede, and Paul the Deacon (1988)
- Rome's Fall and After (1989) (collected studies)
- "The Historia Ecclesiastica: Bede's Agenda and Ours", in Haskins Society Journal 2 (1990), pp. 29–45.
- "The Theme of 'The Barbarian Invasions' in Late Antique and Modern Historiography", in W. Goffart (ed.), Rome's Fall and After, London 1989, pp. 111–32.
- "Breaking the Ortelian Pattern: Historical Atlases with A New Program, 1747–1830," in Editing Early and Historical Atlases, ed. Joan Winearls (1995), 49–81.
- "The barbarians in late antiquity and how they were accommodated in the West", in B. H. Rosenwein and L. K. Little (ed.), Debating the Middle Ages: Issues and readings, Malden, Mass. 1998, pp. 25–44.
- Historical Atlases: The First Three Hundred Years (2003).
- "Conspicuously absent: Martial Heroism in the Histories of Gregory of Tours and its likes", in: K. Mitchell and I. N. Wood (ed.), The World of Gregory of Tours, vol. 8 (Cultures, Beliefs, and Traditions 8), Leiden 2002, pp. 365–93.
- "The front matter of J. G. Hagelgans's 1718 Atlas historicus at Princeton University Library and the Eran Laor Cartographic Collection, Jerusalem," in Princeton University Library Chronicle LXIV, 1 (Autumn 2002), pp. 141–62.
- The narrators of barbarian history (A.D. 550–800). Jordanes, Gregory of Tours, Bede, and Paul the Deacon, Notre Dame 2005.
- "Jordanes's Getica and the Disputed Authenticity of Gothic Origins from Scandinavia", in: Speculum 80 (2005), pp. 379–98.
- "Bede's uera lex historiae explained", in Anglo-Saxon England 36 (2005), pp. 111–16.
- Barbarian Tides: the Migration Age and the Later Roman Empire (2006)
- "The Name 'Merovingian' and the Dating of Beowulf", Anglo-Saxon England 36 (2007), pp. 93–101
- "Frankish military duty and the fate of Roman taxation", in Early Medieval Europe 16:2 (2008), pp. 166–90.
- Barbarians, Maps, and Historiography. Studies on the Early Medieval West (2009) (Collected Studies)
- "The Technique of Barbarian Settlement in the Fifth Century: A Personal, Streamlined Account with Ten Additional Comments", in Journal of Late Antiquity 3:1 (2010), pp. 65–98.
- "The Frankish Pretender Gundovald, 582–585. A Crisis of Merovingian Blood", in Francia: Forschungen zur westeuropäischen Geschichte 39 (2012), pp. 1–27.
- "Le début (et la fin) des sortes Vandalorum", in: Expropriations et confiscations dans les royaumes barbares. Une approche régionale, ed. Pierfrancesco Porena, Yann Rivière, Roma 2012, pp. 115–28.
- "»Defensio patriae« as a Carolingian Military Obligation", in Francia: Forschungen zur westeuropäischen Geschichte 43 (2016), pp. 21–39.
- "The Recruitment of Freemen into the Carolingian Army, or How Far May One Argue from Silence?" in "Journal of Medieval Military History" 16 (2018), pp. 17–34.
- The Industrialist and the Diva: Alexander Smith Cochran, Founder of Yale's Elizabethan Club, and Madame Ganna Walska, Yale 2020.

== See also ==
- Guy Halsall
- Walter Pohl

== Sources ==
- Brink, Stefan (2008). "People and Land in Early Scandinavia". In Garipzanov, Ildar H.; Geary, Patrick J.; Urbańczyk, Przemysław [in Polish] (eds.). Franks, Northmen, and Slavs. Cursor Mundi. Vol. 5. ISD. pp. 87–112. ISBN 978-2503526157.
- Classen, Albrecht [in German] (2010). "Walter Goffart, Barbarian Tides. The Migration Age and the Later Roman Empire". Mediaevistik. 23: 418–20. JSTOR 42587825.
- Curta, Florin (2007). "Barbarian Tides: The Migration Age and the Later Roman Empire. Walter Goffart". Speculum. 82 (3): 705–07. doi:10.1017/S0038713400010460.
- Cusack, Carole M. (January 1, 2003). "On Barbarian Identity: Critical Approaches to Ethnicity in the Early Middle Ages". Parergon. 20 (1): 227–29. doi:10.1353/pgn.2003.0013. JSTOR 40109893. S2CID 143268039.
- Gillett, Andrew (2008). "Barbarian Tides: The Migration Age and the Later Roman Empire". The English Historical Review. CXXIII (503). Oxford University Press: 990–92. doi:10.1093/ehr/cen212.
- Goffart, Walter (1980). Barbarians and Romans, A.D. 418–584: The Techniques of Accommodation. Princeton University Press. ISBN 978-0691102313.
- Goffart, Walter (2006). Barbarian Tides: The Migration Age and the Later Roman Empire. University of Pennsylvania Press. ISBN 978-0812200287.
- Goffart, Walter (October 8, 2010). "OHeather, Empires and Barbarians". The Medieval Review. Indiana University.
- Kulikowski, Michael (2002). "Nation versus Army: A Necessary Contrast". In Gillett, Andrew (ed.). On Barbarian Identity: Critical Approaches to Ethnicity in the Early Middle Ages. ISD. pp. 69–85. ISBN 978-2503511689.
- Liebeschuetz, Wolf (2015). East and West in Late Antiquity: Invasion, Settlement, Ethnogenesis and Conflicts of Religion. Brill. ISBN 978-9004289529.
- Murray, Alexander Callander (1998). After Rome's Fall: Narrators and Sources of Early Medieval History: Essays Presented to Walter Goffart. University of Toronto Press. ISBN 978-0802007797.
- Noble, Thomas F. X. (2006). From Roman Provinces to Medieval Kingdoms. Routledge. ISBN 978-1134337651.
- Northover, Alice (2015). The OUPblog Tenth Anniversary Book. Oxford University Press. ISBN 978-0190461881.
- Pohl, Walter; Gantner, Clemens; Payne, Richard (2016). Visions of Community in the Post-Roman World: The West, Byzantium and the Islamic World, 300–1100. Routledge. ISBN 978-1317001355.
- Pohl, Walter (2014). "Goths and Huns". A Companion to Ethnicity in the Ancient Mediterranean. John Wiley & Sons. pp. 555–68. ISBN 978-1118834381.
- Rutenburg, Jeanine; Eckstein, Arthur M. (March 2007). "Review: The Return of the Fall of Rome". The International History Review. 29 (1). Routledge: 109–22. doi:10.1080/07075332.2007.9641121. JSTOR 40109893. S2CID 159503757.
- Ward-Perkins, Bryan (2006). The Fall of Rome: And the End of Civilization. OUP Oxford. ISBN 978-0191622366.
- Ward-Perkins, Bryan (24 August 2009). "The Decline and Fall Industry". Standpoint.
- Wood, Ian N. (2008). "Barbarians, Historians, and the Construction of National Identities". Journal of Late Antiquity. 20 (1). Johns Hopkins University Press: 61–81. doi:10.1353/jla.0.0007. S2CID 162324371.
- Wood, Ian (2013). The Modern Origins of the Early Middle Ages. OUP Oxford. ISBN 978-0191654770.
- Wright, Glenn (November 1, 2008). "Barbarian Tides: The Migration Age and the Later Roman Empire (review)". Parergon. 25 (1): 223–27. doi:10.1353/pgn.0.0021. S2CID 144008668.
- "Walter Goffart". Gale Literature: Contemporary Authors. Gale. June 18, 2010.
- "Walter A. Goffart". Dictionary of American Scholars. Gale. 2002.
