= Furta sacra =

Medieval practice of stealing relics

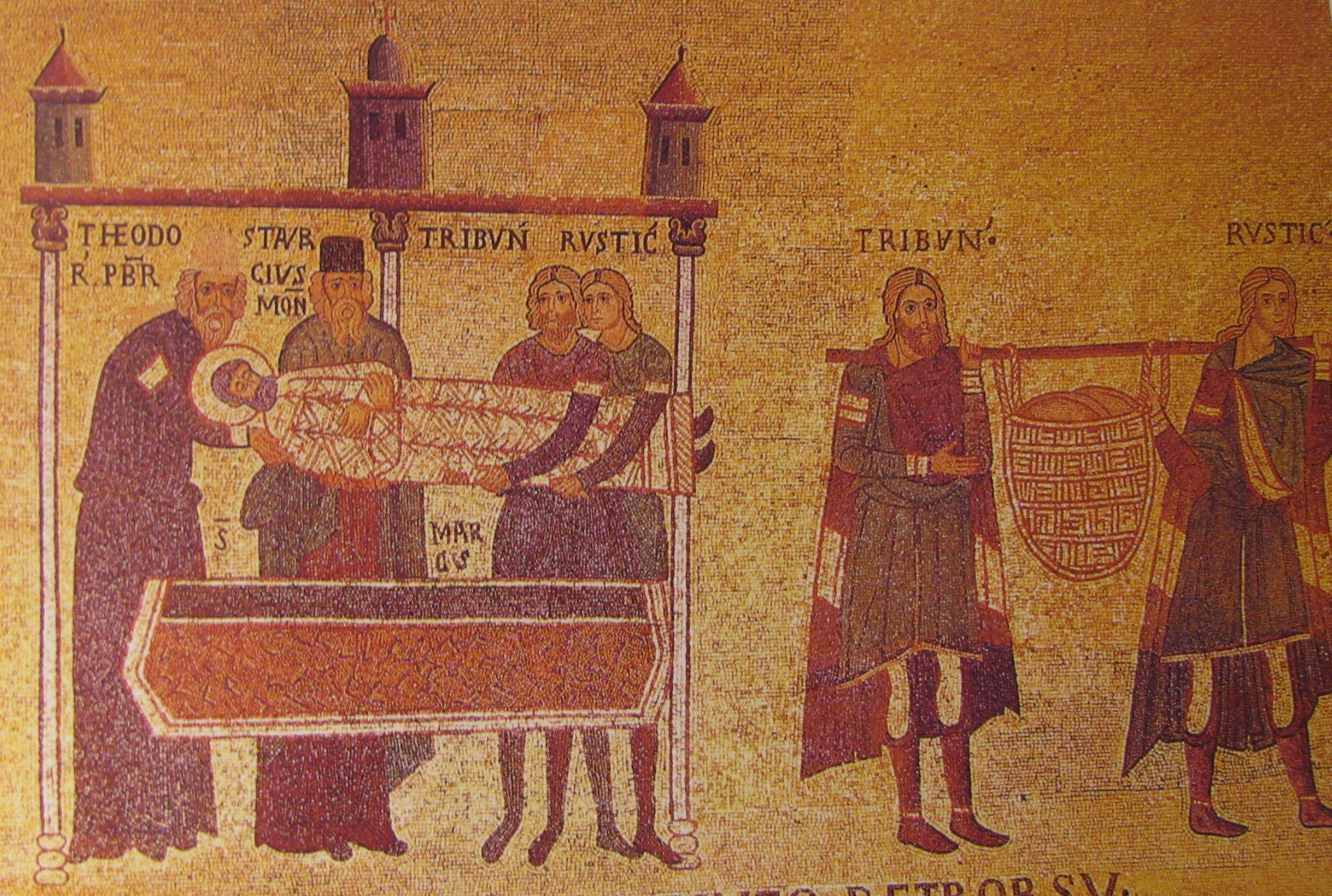
Taking the body of Saint Mark the Evangelist from Alexandria and hiding it into a basket. 11th-century mosaic in St. Mark's Cathedral, Venice.

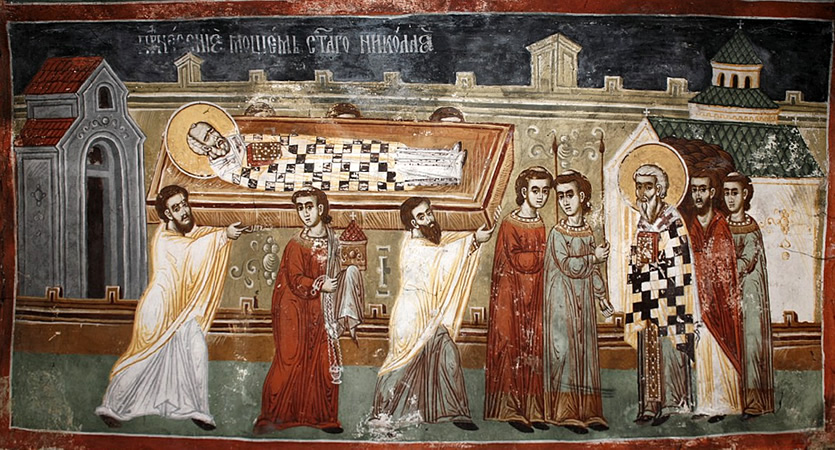
The translation of the relics of Saint Nicholas from Myra to Bari. By Radul (1673–74), Patriarchate of Peć, Serbia.

Furta Sacra refers to the theft of relics in western medieval Europe by Christians.

== History ==
The Middle Ages were a period of turmoil, and theft of relics was common. The phrase furta sacra was made popular by Patrick J. Geary in a book with the same name. Geary published Furta Sacra: Thefts of Relics in the Central Middle Ages in 1978; the book argued that relic theft was integral to the identity and culture of medieval Europe. Geary relays the hagiographic narratives that framed the thefts in a divine light, legitimizing the religious and political authorities' possession of relics. It commonly occurred in many kingdoms, cities, and duchies spanning across the Mediterranean and western Europe. Florence Bourgne links the concept of furta sacra to the translation of texts, suggesting that Europe's modern claims of Mediterranean culture stemmed from both linguistic and material appropriation of documents and relics. Relics were important for the populations of Europe, as they were thought to have contained the spirits of saints. Adherents would pray to the relics and their corresponding saints in times of need. Thus, bringing a relic to a church would bolster that church's prestige, prompting pilgrimages to the saint's tomb, increasing donations, and attracting more visitors. The thefts were often carried out during war. Authors Tomasz Borowski and Christopher Gerrard furthered the field of study by connecting relic theft to the identities of military orders such as the Templars and Hospitallers. Said orders combined religious devotion with the gain of political power; stealing relics would bolster their claim to both. Acquirement of relics was also accomplished via other means, such as persuading guardian priests or petty theft. Exemplifying this is Venice's acquisition of the body of Mark the Evangelist in 827, which was made possible by ecclesiastical and martial maneuvering. This also helps explain why this was done by people who would otherwise likely view theft as a major sin, especially given that the theft was of a saint themself.

== Context and circumstances of furta sacra ==
One particular instance of furta sacra that helps provide context for the practice as a whole is the theft of Mark the Evangelist and his coffin. During this time, Venice was sandwiched between two great powers: the expansionist Carolingian Empire on one side and the Byzantine Empire on the other. The reason is given by Patrick Geary in his 1978 book: "In 827 Venice was as usual attempting to maintain the maximum possible independence from Carolingian Italy on one hand and from the Byzantine Empire on the other without completely giving up good relations with either". Geary illustrates the precarious position of Venice during that period, with the potential for the city to be absorbed by external forces, a prospect that likely appeared very credible to the nobility and clergy of Venice. The external threats become even more tangible when considering that Charlemagne's son attempted to besiege the city in 810 but ultimately failed. This underscores the genuine military threat posed by the Carolingians, despite the failure of the Frankish siege. Nonetheless, this does not exclude the possibility that the Carolingians might have undermined Venice's independence through ecclesiastical channels. Furthermore, Geary extensively discusses potential reasons for Mark's eventual divestiture, framing them within the ecclesiastical disputes of the period. The concept of Venice losing its spiritual autonomy gained prominence within the church at that time, largely because Mark the Evangelist founded the church of Aquileia, to which other regional churches owed allegiance. Marco Papasidero, in multiple works, revisits the Italian context of furta sacra, highlighting the hagiographic biases that reimagined narratives to uphold Christian legitimacy and reinforce local identity. In this context, Venice was evidently seeking to assert power and to distance itself from the Aquileians. Failure would mean allegiance to Aquileia and, therefore, to the Carolingians. The Venetians could not accept the state of affairs, as it would mean a total loss of power for those in charge. Still, it risked angering the Byzantine Empire, which was likewise very touchy about Venice's long-term goal of independence. The Byzantines' anger toward the Venetians was a concern because, before Alexandria fell to the Islamic forces, it was in their hands; in their eyes, the body of Mark belonged to them. This question of independence is addressed directly by Geary: "This decision in favor of Aquileia, had it gone unchallenged, would have amounted to a major setback for the Venetians' efforts toward autonomy… he found a way in the acquisition of the body of Saint Mark. The choice could not have been better; the benefits of this acquisition only began by allowing a claim of superiority by the church possessing the body of a near Apostle over one merely founded by him". This analysis indicates that it is highly probable the Venetians seized the body of Mark primarily due to political expediency. While this background provides some rationale for the occurrence of furta sacra, it does not address why ordinary individuals would accept such acts, which constitute direct theft. The common person may still question, "Is it morally acceptable to steal these relics?" Early Enlightenment historians, including Honore de Sainte-Maria and members of the Discalced Carmelites, examined the reasons behind these thefts. In summary, relics were predominantly acquired through monetary transactions or obligations rooted in faith or social obligation; in these latter contexts, furta sacra was most evident. Honore de Sainte-Maria defended these thefts by asserting that the relics continued to be venerated as divine objects. Archaeologist Marcantonio Boldetti wrote a chapter in his 1720 Observations on the Cemeteries of Holy Martyrs in which he called the practice a sin under any circumstance, in contradiction to his contemporaries, who argued that the practice was justified as an act of God. The debate reached Pope Benedict XIV (r. 1740–1758), who, in his fourth book, mentions many cases of theft of relics. While reflecting upon the authenticity of relics, he uses the term furtum. He includes thirteen examples in his book De servorum Dei beatificatione et beatorum canonizatione. The pope concluded that these claims to relics were legitimate if supported by historical sources, local tradition, or papal declarations, regardless of the means by which the relic was acquired. His words were set as the standard until the nineteenth century.

== Religious war as an avenue for furta sacra ==
Following the collapse of Rome, the Eastern Roman Empire held together to form the Byzantine Empire. Still, in the West, a series of empires, city-states, and provinces continuously vied for power. The fragmented West allowed regional groups’ hunger for power to grow. Furta sacra was a way for these regions to bolster their identity and power, cementing their place in the region. This was common in northern Italy, where fractured cities fought for prestige and piety. In this power vacuum, the church consolidated its power, leading to the pope exercising more centralized control. The rise of Islam saw Muslim armed forces sweep throughout the Middle East, North Africa, and Asia, controlling cities that were once Christian strongholds. The religious divide between Christian Europe and the now Muslim-controlled Southern and Eastern Mediterranean led to much resentment. Damien Boquet and Piroska Nagy investigated the emotional resonance of relics, showing how their spirituality shaped medieval responses to their theft. This research argued that relic thefts were considered divinely sanctioned. Christian’s felt divinely called to 'rescue' Christian relics from the control of Islamic invaders, seeing their thefts as divinely sanctioned. This is confirmed by contemporary sources like The Golden Legend. In the text, the theft of Mark from Alexandria is discussed in a case where people from Venice were able to convince the priests who concealed the body to be taken away from Alexandra in fear of the new Muslim rulers of the city. The fact that the body is described as being taken to the Venetian ship and "borne secretly and privily" shows that both the Venetians and eastern priests feared the relic falling into Muslim hands. Byzantium was the continuation of Rome, and thought they should be the hub for religion, like they already were for arts and economics. As time went on, more differences between Western and Eastern doctrine changed. This is seen in the banning of iconography and, eventually, in schism. This played a big role in where we see furta sacra; the prohibition on iconography did not just affect artwork but also relics. The West valued relics more than the East, which is why we see furta sacra occur more frequently in Western Europe. Alfred J. Andrea and Paul I. Rachlin analyzed numerous crusade-era texts determining how holy war and relic theft were intertwined when creating a medieval Christian identity that the West could cling onto for power in the Mediterranean Basin. These factors manifest in the Fourth Crusade. Historians David M. Perry and M.J. Angold examined furta sacra through the lens of the Fourth Crusade, arguing that the theft of relics served as political propaganda for Western European expansion. Along with Islamic control of the birthplace of Christianity in Jerusalem, the pope called for a Crusade, where knights of Western Europe rode into Jerusalem, capturing the city and looting the relics they could find. Western Europeans went to the Middle East to pillage and plunder. Taking back jewels, art, and relics with the biggest relic of them all, Jerusalem. This furta sacra was called upon and supported by the reigning pope. This shows how the practice of furta sacra became normalized over time, manifesting in the pope calling for such.
