= John F. Drinkwater =

British historian

John Frederick Drinkwater
- Born: 1947 (age 77–78)
- Citizenship: UK
- Scientific career
- Fields: History, archaeology
- Institutions: University of Nottingham University of Sheffield

John Frederick Drinkwater (born 1947) is a British historian, classicist, and author. He is Emeritus Professor of Roman Imperial History in the Department of Classics and Archaeology at the University of Nottingham and Honorary Lecturer in the Department of Archaeology at the University of Sheffield.

Drinkwater specializes in the study of the Roman West and the Julio-Claudian dynasty. He is a Fellow of the Society of Antiquaries of London and a former joint editor of the Derbyshire Archaeological Journal.

== Biography ==
Drinkwater speaks of a lifelong interest in the Romans, beginning with a picture book he received as a young child, and then citing the BBC television series, Dr Who, as another major influence - specifically the four episode serial titled "The Romans" in 1965.

He was educated at Sale County Grammar School for Boys, and graduated BA and MA at Jesus College, Cambridge, and DPhil at Magdalen College, Oxford. He was first appointed Lecturer in Ancient History at the University of Sheffield and later Reader and Professor at the University of Nottingham. His general area of research is the Roman Empire, in particular the Roman West, although he also has a strong interest in the history of the Julio-Claudian dynasty. He is known for his numerous works on Roman Gaul, and on the Third Century Crisis of Rome. In 2007 a study of the office of Roman emperor led him to focus on Nero and, in 2019, to publish Nero: Emperor and Court. This work was referenced in the BBC Radio series, In Our Time.

He has been joint editor of the Derbyshire Archaeological Journal, and is now Professor Emeritus of Roman Imperial History at the Department of Classics and Archaeology at the University of Nottingham. and honorary lecturer in Archaeology at the University of Sheffield.

In 1984-5 Drinkwater was a Research Fellow of the Alexander von Humboldt-Stiftung at the University of Trier. In May 1990 he was elected a Fellow of the Society of Antiquaries of London.

== Bibliography ==
- Roman Gaul; The Three Provinces, 58 B.C.-A.D. 260, 1983
- The Gallic Empire; Separatism and Continuity in the North-Western Provinces of the Roman Empire A.D. 260-274, 1987
- Fifth-century Gaul : A Crisis of Identity - with Hugh Elton, 1992
- The Alamanni and Rome 213-496 (Caracalla to Clovis), 2007
- Nero: Emperor and Court, 2019
