= Richard Bessel =

British historian

Richard Bessel FRHistS
- Born: Richard Bessel; 29 April 1948 (age 78); Springfield, Massachusetts

Academic background
- Education: Antioch College; University of Oxford

Academic work
- Discipline: History
- Institutions: 1977–79, Parkes Fellow, University of Southampton; 1979–98, senior lecturer, Open University; 1998–present, professor, University of York

Richard Bessel FRHistS is professor of twentieth century history at the University of York and a member of the editorial boards of German History and History Today. He is a specialist in the social and political history of modern Germany, the aftermath of the two world wars and the history of policing.

Bessel earned his BA at Antioch College and his DPhil at the University of Oxford. He is a fellow of the Royal Historical Society. He is also a fellow of the Freiburg Institute for Advanced Studies.

== Reviews ==
Bessel's Germany 1945: From War to Peace (2009), dealing with the transition from German defeat at the end of the Second World War to peace, was positively reviewed by Jeffry Diefendorf in H-Net, with the reviewer noting its relevance to modern debates about failed states and nation building. Brian Ladd, in The New York Times, noted Bessel's "sober" treatment of the topic and his preference for understatement over pathos.

In Violence - A Modern Obsession (2015), Bessel gave a history of violence in the twentieth century that The Guardian's reviewer saw as a warning. Ian Bell, in The Herald, noted the denseness of the material and the hellishness of the twentieth century outlined by Bessel, but also that the work was thoughtful rather than being a polemic against violence.

== Selected publications ==
- Political Violence and the Rise of Nazism. The Storm Troopers in Eastern Germany 1925–1934. New Haven: Yale University Press, 1984.
- Life in the Third Reich. Oxford: Oxford University Press, 1987.
- Germany after the First World War. Oxford: Oxford University Press, 1993; paperback edition 1995.
- Fascist Italy and Nazi Germany. Comparisons and Contrasts. Cambridge: Cambridge University Press, 1996.
- Nazism and War. New York: Random House, 2004.
- Germany 1945: From War to Peace. Simon & Schuster and HarperCollins, 2009.
- Violence: A Modern Obsession. Simon & Schuster, 2015. ISBN 978-0743239578
