= Andrew Gillett =

Australian historian

Academic background
- Education: University of Queensland (BA); University of Toronto (MA, PhD)
- Doctoral advisor: Walter Goffart

Academic work
- Discipline: History
- Institutions: Macquarie University
- Main interests: Late Antiquity
- Notable works: Envoys and Political Communication in the Late Antique West, 411-533, 2003

Andrew Gillett is an Australian historian who is associate professor of history at the Department of Ancient History at Macquarie University. A protégé of Walter Goffart of the Toronto School of History, Gillett researches and teaches the field of Late Antiquity.

== Biography ==
Andrew Gillett is from Australia. He received his BA in Australian Social History and Modern European History from the University of Queensland (1986), and an MA (1989) and PhD (1994) in Medieval Studies at the Centre for Medieval Studies of the University of Toronto. His PhD was supervised by Walter Goffart, leader of the so-called Toronto School of History. At Toronto, Gillett was a co-student and intimate friend of Michael Kulikowski.

After gaining his PhD, Gillett taught at the universities of Toronto and Melbourne. Gillett is currently associate professor of history at the Department of Ancient History at Macquarie University.

Gillett researches and teaches the field of Late Antiquity in Western Europe. He is particularly interested in the role of communication in public life, and how the period of Late Antiquity has been constructed by modern historians. Gillett is well known as the editor of the book On Barbarian Identity: Critical Approaches to Ethnicity in the Early Middle Ages (2002).

== Selected works ==
- Envoys and Political Communication in the Late Antique West, 411-533, 2003

== Sources ==
- "Associate Professor Andrew Gillett". Macquarie University.
- Gillett, Andrew (2003). Envoys and Political Communication in the Late Antique West, 411–533. Cambridge University Press. ISBN 1139440039.
