= Ian N. Wood =

British medievalist

Ian Wood
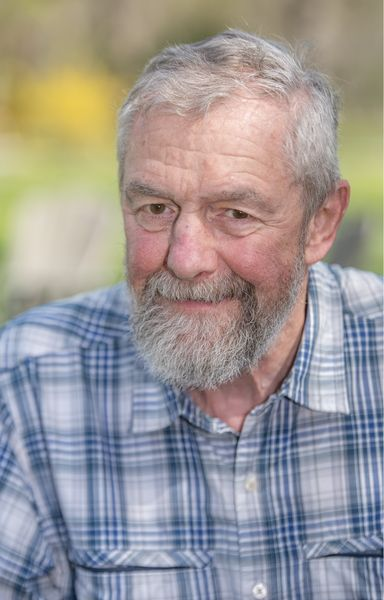
- Wood in 2023
- Born: 1950 (age 75–76)
- Education: University of Oxford (PhD)

Ian N. Wood, (born 1950) is an English scholar of early medieval history, and a professor at the University of Leeds who specializes in the history of the Merovingian dynasty and the missionary efforts on the European continent. Patrick J. Geary called him "the leading British historian of Francia".

== Early life and education ==
Wood received his BA (with first class honours) in 1972, MA in 1974, and PhD on Avitus of Vienne in 1980 from Corpus Christi College, Oxford.

== Academic career ==
Wood taught at the University of Leeds from 1976 onwards. He became Professor of Early Medieval History in 1995, the same year he delivered the Jarrow Lecture. He retired from teaching in 2015. Wood taught a range of courses on Roman history and early medieval history at Leeds including a special subject on 'The Fall of the Roman Empire'.

Wood is the author of several monographs and edited collections as well as around two hundred scholarly articles. His first monograph, The Merovingian Kingdoms (450-751), was called a "wonderful book" and "one of the finest results of this new interest" in the Merovingian dynasty.

== Honours ==
In July 2019, Wood was elected a Fellow of the British Academy (FBA), the United Kingdom's national academy for the humanities and social sciences. A Festschrift in his honour was published in 2021.

== Publications ==
=== Books ===
- The Merovingian Kingdoms (450-751) (London, 1994)
- Gregory of Tours (Bangor, 1994)
- The Missionary Life (London, 2001)
- Avitus of Vienne: Letters and Selected Prose (Liverpool, 2002, with Danuta Shanzer)
- Fragments of History: Rethinking the Ruthwell and Bewcastle Monuments (Manchester, 2007, with Fred Orton and Clare Lees)
- The Modern Origins of the Early Middle Ages (Oxford, 2013)
- Abbots of Wearmouth and Jarrow (Oxford, 2013, with Chris Grocock)
