= German History (journal) =

- Discipline: German history
- Language: English
- Edited by: Neil Gregor, Bridget Heal

Publication details
- History: 1984-present
- Publisher: Oxford University Press (United Kingdom)
- Frequency: Quarterly
- Impact factor: 0.483 (2013)

Standard abbreviations
- ISO 4: Ger. Hist.

Indexing
- ISSN: 0266-3554 (print); 1477-089X (web)

Links
- Journal homepage

German History is a quarterly peer-reviewed academic journal of German history. It is published by Oxford University Press on behalf of the German History Society. It was established in 1984. The editors-in-chief are Neil Gregor of the University of Southampton and Bridget Heal of St Andrews University. Another notable member of the editorial board was Richard Bessel of the University of York.

== Abstracting and indexing ==
The journal is abstracted and indexed in Abstracts in Anthropology, Historical Abstracts, and ProQuest databases. According to the Journal Citation Reports, the journal has a 2013 impact factor of 0.483.

== See also ==
- List of history journals
