= Bryan Ward-Perkins =

English archaeologist and historian

Bryan Ward-Perkins FRHistS is an archaeologist and historian of the later Roman Empire and early Middle Ages, with a particular focus on the transitional period between those two eras, an historical sub-field also known as Late Antiquity. Ward-Perkins is an emeritus fellow in history at Trinity College, Oxford. He joined the college in 1981 and received the title of distinction of Professor of Late Antique History in November 2014.

== Early life and education ==
The son of historian John Bryan Ward-Perkins, he was born and raised in Rome and spoke Italian from childhood. He graduated from Magdalen College, Oxford with a Doctor of Philosophy (DPhil) degree in 1980: his doctoral thesis was titled "Urban public building in Italy, north of Salerno 300–850 AD".

== Academic interests ==
Ward-Perkins' published work has focused primarily on the urban and economic history of the Mediterranean and western Europe during Late Antiquity. His 2005 book, The Fall of Rome and the End of Civilization, included statements addressing what he saw as an over-correction in the approaches of modern historiography to late Roman history. Using primarily archaeological evidence, Ward-Perkins takes issue with what he says is the "fashionable" idea that the western Roman Empire did not actually fall but instead experienced a mostly-benign transformation into the Christian kingdoms of medieval Europe. In his contrasting view, "the coming of the Germanic peoples was very unpleasant for the Roman population, and the long-term effects of the dissolution of the empire were dramatic."

Ward-Perkins' contributions to fourteenth volume of The Cambridge Ancient History were praised by Jan Willem Drijvers and Geoffrey Greatrex, with the latter declaring that Ward-Perkins' chapters on the economy of the late Roman Empire were "among the finest of the volume".

== Awards and honours ==
- 2006 Hessell-Tiltman Prize, The Fall of Rome and the End of Civilization

== Selected works ==
- 1984: From Classical Antiquity to the Middle Ages: urban public building in Northern and Central Italy AD 300–850. Oxford: Clarendon Press ISBN 0-19-821898-2
- 1998: "The Cities", in The Cambridge Ancient History, Vol. XIII: 337–425
- 2000: "Why did the Anglo-Saxons not become more British?" (English Historical Review, June 2000)
- 2001: The Cambridge Ancient History, Vol. XIV: 425–600 (edited with Averil Cameron and Michael Whitby). Cambridge University Press
- 2005: The Fall of Rome and the End of Civilization. Oxford: Oxford University Press ISBN 0-19-280564-9
- Smith, R. R. R.; Ward-Perkins, Bryan, eds. (2016). The Last Statues of Antiquity. Oxford: Oxford University Press. ISBN 978-0198753322.
