= Patrick J. Geary =

American medievalist (born 1948)

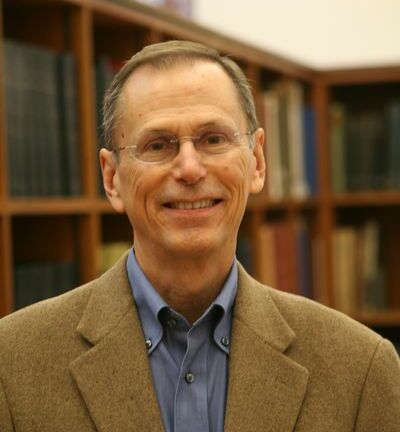
- Geary in 2011
- Born: September 26, 1948 (age 78); Jackson, Mississippi, U.S.

Academic background
- Education: Spring Hill College (BA); Catholic University of Louvain; Yale University (PhD)
- Influences: Georges Duby; Robert Sabatino Lopez; Herwig Wolfram

Academic work
- Discipline: Medieval history
- Sub-discipline: Early medieval period; cultural history; social history; relics; social memory
- School or tradition: Vienna School
- Institutions: Princeton University; University of Florida; University of California, Los Angeles; Institute for Advanced Study

Patrick J. Geary (born September 26, 1948) is an American medievalist. He is a professor emeritus of Western Medieval History at the Institute for Advanced Study in Princeton, New Jersey. From 2004 to 2011, he also held the title of Distinguished Professor of Medieval History Emeritus at the University of California, Los Angeles.

== Early life and education ==
Raised in Louisiana, Geary was educated at Spring Hill College in Mobile, Alabama, and the Catholic University of Leuven in Belgium. In 1974, he received his Doctor of Philosophy degree in medieval studies from Yale University, where he studied with Roberto Sabatino Lopez and Jaroslav Pelikan.

== Career ==
Geary's primary area of research has been in the early Middle Ages, from circa AD 500 to circa 1100. His scholarship has made significant contributions to a number of areas of medieval social and cultural history, including the cult of relics, literacy and social memory, conflict and dispute resolution, and the formation of ethnic identity in early Europe. He has also published and spoken frequently on the development of medieval history as an academic discipline in Europe and the United States.

Over the course of his career, Geary has taught at Princeton University, the University of Florida, UCLA and the University of Notre Dame. He has also held visiting professorships at several European universities. In 2009, he served as the president of the Medieval Academy of America, and was previously director of the UCLA Center for Medieval and Renaissance Studies and the Medieval Institute at University of Notre Dame.

At UCLA from 2005 to 2012, Geary directed a multi-year, international collaborative project sponsored by the Andrew W. Mellon Foundation to produce a computerized image and object database of the Plan of Saint Gall, a medieval architectural drawing of a monastic compound dating from the early ninth century.

At the Institute for Advanced Study, Geary worked with an interdisciplinary team of North American and European researchers to apply advanced DNA analysis to early medieval burial remains from Italy and central Europe to help understand population movement and social structures during the so-called "barbarian migrations".

== Selected works ==
- Manufacturing a Past for the Present: Forgery and Authenticity in Medievalist Texts and Objects in Nineteenth-Century Europe, ed. J.M. Bak and P.J. Geary. Brill, 2014.
- Furta Sacra: Thefts of Relics in the Central Middle Ages, Princeton: Princeton University Press, 1978. Revised edition 1991. French translation Le Vol des Reliques. Aubier, 1993. Italian translation Coltura e Pensiero 2000.
- "L'humiliation des saints", Annales, E.S.C. 34 (1979), pp. 27–42
- "Ethnic Identity as a Situational Construct in the Early Middle Ages", Mitteilungen der anthropologischen Gesellschaft in Wien vol. 113 (1983) pp. 15–26
- Aristocracy in Provence: The Rhone Basin at the Dawn of the Carolingian Age. University of Pennsylvania Press, Philadelphia; Anton Hiersemann Verlag, Stuttgart, 1985.
- "Vivre en conflit dans une France sans état: Typologie des mécanismes de règlement des conflits (1050–1200)", Annales, E.S.C. (1985) pp. 1107–1133.
- Before France and Germany: The Creation and Transformation of the Merovingian World, Oxford University Press, New York, 1988. French translation, Le monde Mérovingien Flammarion, 1989. German Translation, Die Merowinger, C. H. Beck, 1996 Korean Translation Vistabooks, 1999.
- Phantoms of Remembrance: Memory and Oblivion at the end of the first Millennium, Princeton University Press, 1994. French translation Aubier 1996
- Medieval Germany in America. German Historical Institute Annual Lecture 1995 (German Historical Institute, 1996).
- The Myth of Nations: The Medieval Origins of Europe. Princeton: Princeton University Press, 2002. German Translation: Europäische Völker im frühen Mittelalter. Zur Legende vom Werden der Nationen. Frankfurt: Fischer, 2002.
- Women at the Beginning: Origin Myths from the Amazons to the Virgin Mary. (Princeton: Princeton University Press, 2006).
- Historians as Public Intellectuals. Southampton: University of Southampton, Centre for Antiquity and the Middle Ages, 2007 (The Reuter Lecture 2006).

== See also ==
- List of people from Indiana
- List of people from Mobile, Alabama
- List of Princeton University people
- List of University of California, Los Angeles people
- List of University of Florida faculty and administrators
- List of Yale University people
