= Timeline of Ravenna =

The following is a timeline of the history of the city of Ravenna in the Emilia-Romagna region of Italy.

== Prior to 20th century ==
- 191 BC – Romans in power in region.
- 1st–3rd century AD – Roman Catholic diocese of Ravenna established.
- 402 AD – Capital of the Western Roman Empire relocated to Ravenna from Milan (until 476).
- 425 AD – San Giovanni Evangelista church construction begins.
- 475 – Battle of Ravenna (475) for the control of the Western Roman Empire.
- 476 – Battle of Ravenna (476). Deposition of Romulus Augustus. Fall of the Western Roman Empire. Odoacer in power.
- 491 – Theodoric begins siege Odoacer in Ravenna
- 493 – Theodoric the Great in power.
- 505 – Arian Sant'Apollinare Nuovo church construction begins.
- 520 – Mausoleum of Theodoric built near town.:
- 526 – Chiesa dello Spirito Santo (Ravenna) (church) built.
- 540 – Forces of Byzantine Belisarius take Ravenna.
- 547 – Basilica of San Vitale consecrated.
- 549 – Basilica of Sant'Apollinare in Classe consecrated near Ravenna.
- 584 – Exarchate of Ravenna established (approximate date).
- 729 – Battle of Ravenna (729)
- 751 - Lombard King Aistulf conquests Ravenna.
- 756 - Pepin, King of the Franks, defeats the Lombards and conveys Ravenna to Pope Stephen.
- 967 – Imperial Diet held by Otto II, Holy Roman Emperor
- 1218 - The Traversari comes to power in Ravenna during Guelph-Ghibelline conflict.
- 1240 - Holy Roman Emperor Frederick II besieges Ravenna and expels the Traversari.
- 1248 - Pope Innocent IV takes Ravenna and the Traversari returned to power.
- 1275 - The Traversari are driven from Ravenna by Guido Novello da Polenta. The Da Polenta family establish a hereditary lordship.
- 1441 – Venice takes possession of Ravenna as a condition of the Peace of Cremona (1441).
- 1509 - France defeats Venice in the War of the League of Cambrai; League members occupy Venice's mainland territories.
- 1512 – France defeats Holy League forces at the Battle of Ravenna (1512); France sacks Ravenna.
- 1737 – Canale Candiano (canal) to Adriatic Sea created.
- 1752 – Società Letteraria Ravennate (learned society) founded.
- 1797 – Ravenna becomes part of the Dipartimento del Rubicone of the French client Cispadane Republic.
- 1804 – Biblioteca Classense (library) established.
- 1820/21 – Home of Lord Byron for eighteen months.
- 1826 – Accademia filarmonica (music academy) founded.
- 1849 – Anita Garibaldi succumbed to fatigue during the retreat from Rome.
- 1852 – Teatro Comunale Alighieri opens.
- 1859 – Papal rule ends.
- 1860 – Ravenna becomes part of the Kingdom of Piedmont-Sardinia.
- 1863 – Ravenna railway station opens.
- 1881 – Population: 34,270.
- 1897 – Population: 67,760.

== 20th century ==
- 1911 – Population: 71,581.
- 1913 – Unione Sportiva Ravennate (football club) formed.
- 1921 – Ferrovia Faenza-Ravenna (railway) begins operating.
- 1927 – Biblioteca di storia contemporanea Alfredo Oriani (library) established.
- 1966 – Stadio Bruno Benelli (stadium) opens.
- 1983 – Teatro delle Albe (theatre group) formed.
- 1990 – Ravenna Festival of music begins.
- 1997 – Vidmer Mercatali becomes mayor.

== 21st century ==
- 2006 – Fabrizio Matteucci becomes mayor.
- 2011 – Some of the 2011 FIFA Beach Soccer World Cup played in Ravenna.
- 2013 – Population: 154,288.
- 2014 – November: Emilia-Romagna regional election, 2014 held.
- 2016 – June: Italian local elections, 2016 held; Michele De Pascale becomes mayor.
- 2024 – November: Emilia-Romagna regional election, 2024 held. Mayor De Pascale is elected president of Emilia-Romagna.
- 2025 – May: Italian local elections, 2025 held; Alessandro Barattoni becomes mayor.

== See also ==
- Ravenna history
- History of Ravenna
- Classe, ancient port of Ravenna
- List of mayors of Ravenna
- List of bishops of Ravenna

Timelines of other cities in the macroregion of Northeast Italy:^{(it)}

- Emilia-Romagna region: Timeline of Bologna; Ferrara; Forlì; Modena; Parma; Piacenza; Reggio Emilia; Rimini
- Friuli-Venezia Giulia region: Timeline of Trieste
- Trentino-South Tyrol region: Timeline of Trento
- Veneto region: Timeline of Padua; Treviso; Venice; Verona; Vicenza

== Bibliography ==
- Andreas Agnellus, Liber Pontificalis Ecclesiae Ravennatis. 9th century

=== in English ===
- William Henry Overall, ed. (1870). "Ravenna". Dictionary of Chronology. London: William Tegg. hdl:2027/uc2.ark:/13960/t9m32q949.
- William Smith, ed. (1872) [1854]. "Ravenna". Dictionary of Greek and Roman Geography. London: John Murray. hdl:2027/hvd.ah5cur.
- "Ravenna". Chambers's Encyclopaedia. London. 1901. hdl:2027/njp.32101065312934.
- Umberto Cassuto (1905), "Ravenna", Jewish Encyclopedia, vol. 10, New York, hdl:2027/msu.31293024395141
- Hodgkin, Thomas; Ashby, Thomas (1910). "Ravenna" . Encyclopædia Britannica. Vol. 22 (11th ed.). pp. 923–927.
- Benjamin Vincent (1910), "Ravenna", Haydn's Dictionary of Dates (25th ed.), London: Ward, Lock & Co., hdl:2027/uc2.ark:/13960/t41r6xh8t
- Herbermann, Charles George; Pace, Edward Aloysius; Pallen, Condé Bénoist; Shahan, Thomas Joseph; Wynne, John Joseph (1911). "Ravenna". Catholic Encyclopedia. Vol. 12. New York.
- "Ravenna", Northern Italy (14th ed.), Leipzig: Karl Baedeker, 1913
- Edward Hutton. The Story of Ravenna. Great Britain: J.M. Dent and Sons Limited, 1926
- A. J. Wharton. Refiguring the Post Classical City: Dura Europos, Jerash, Jerusalem, and Ravenna (Cambridge, 1995)
- Roy Domenico (2002). "Emilia Romagna: Ravenna". Regions of Italy: a Reference Guide to History and Culture. Greenwood. pp. 97+. ISBN 0313307334.
- Christopher Kleinhenz, ed. (2004). "Ravenna". Medieval Italy: an Encyclopedia. Routledge. pp. 949–954. ISBN 0415939291.
- D. Deliyannis (2010). Ravenna in Late Antiquity. Cambridge. ISBN 978-1107612907.
- Judith Herrin (2022). Ravenna: Capital of Empire, Crucible of Europe. Princeton University Press. ISBN 9780691204222.

=== in Italian ===
- Primo Uccellini [in Italian] (1855). Dizionario storico di Ravenna e di altri luoghi di Romagna (in Italian).
- Gaspare Ribuffi (1869). Guida di Ravenna (2nd ed.). stabilimento tip.di G.Angeletti.
- Nicola Bernardini, ed. (1890). "Provincia di Ravenna". Guida della stampa periodica italiana (in Italian). Lecce: R. Tipografia editrice salentina dei fratelli Spacciante. hdl:2027/njp.32101074983378.
- Corrado Ricci [in Italian] (1900). Guida di Ravenna (3rd ed.). Bologna.
- "Ravenna", Enciclopedia Italiana (in Italian), 1935
- Raffaella Farioli (1979). "Principale bibliografia su Ravenna". Felix Ravenna (in Italian) (117). ISSN 0391-7517.
