= 2023 Emilia-Romagna floods =

Natural disaster in Northern Italy

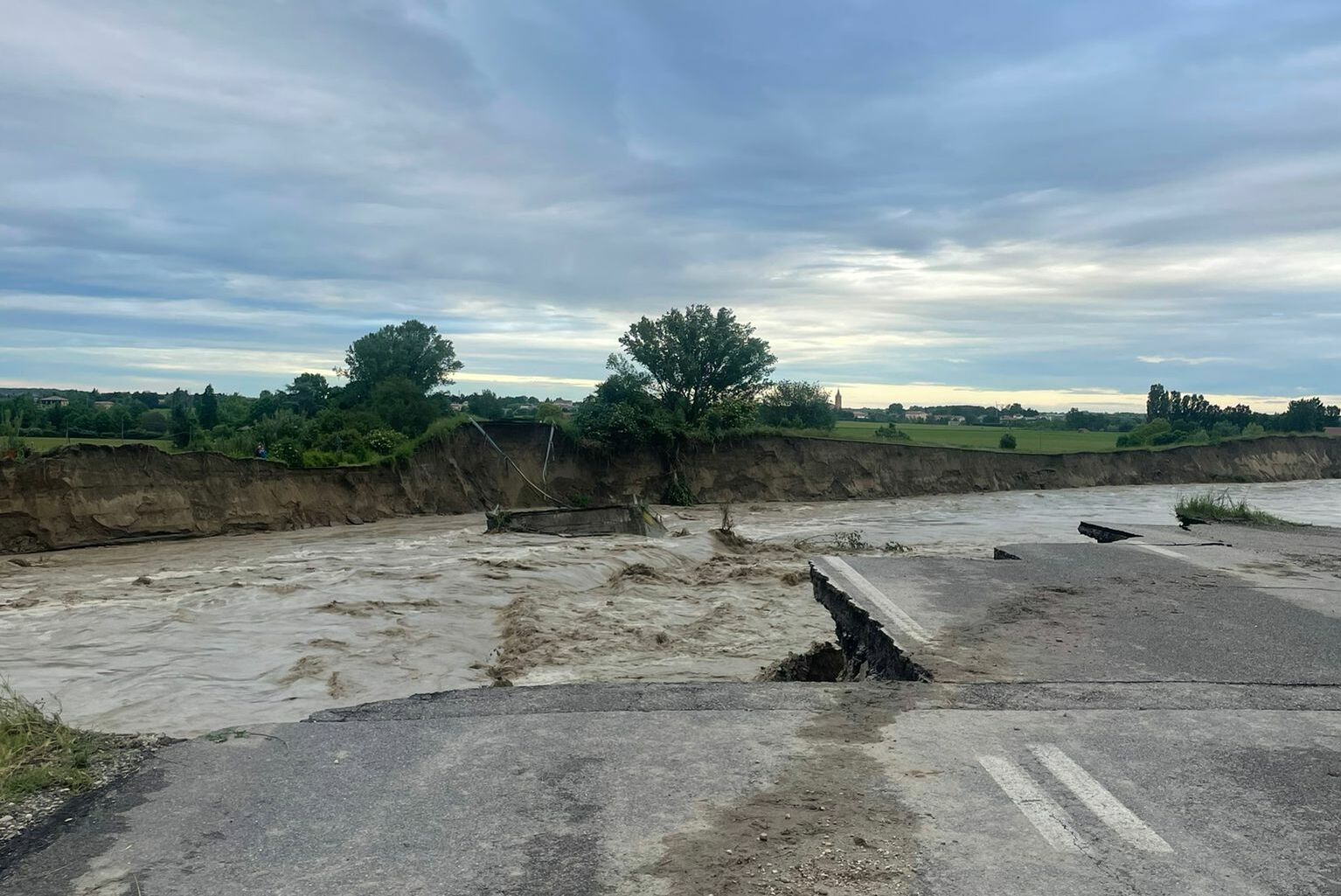
- A collapsed bridge on the Idice river near Bologna

Meteorological history
- Duration: 2–3 May 2023; 16–17 May 2023

Flood

Overall effects
- Fatalities: 17 (Note: Two on 3 May and fifteen on 16–17 May)
- Damage: 50,000+ displaced €10+ billion damages
- Areas affected: Bologna, Cesena, Forlì, Ravenna, Rimini, Faenza

A series of floods were in and around the cities of Bologna, Cesena, Forlì, Faenza, Ravenna, and Rimini, in the Emilia-Romagna region of Italy. The first floods occurred between 2 and 3 May 2023, killing two people. More severe floods took place on 16–17 May 2023, killing at least 15 people and displacing 50,000 others.

The same amount of rain which usually falls in seven months fell in two weeks, causing the overflow of twenty-three rivers across the region. In some areas, almost half the annual average of rain fell in only 36 hours. Moreover, 400 landslides occurred in the area and 43 cities and towns were flooded. The provisional cost of the damage caused by the floods amounted to more than €10 billion (US$11 billion).

== History ==
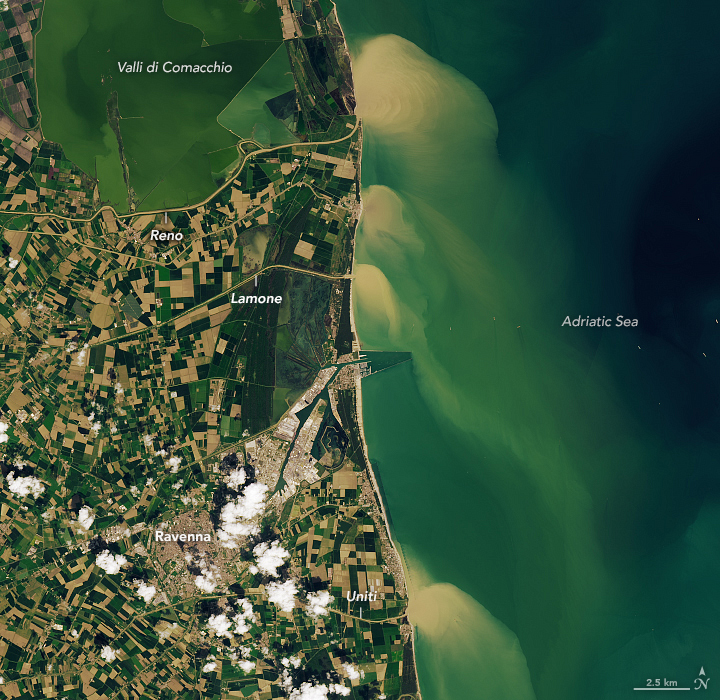
Sediments of the floods in the Adriatic Sea seen from Landsat 8 on 4 May 2023

Following months of severe drought, heavy rains hit the Italian region between 2 and 3 May 2023, particularly within the provinces of Bologna and Ravenna. Some rivers overflowed in Romagna, causing widespread damage in the plains and killing two people. On 12 May, the Metropolitan City of Bologna was hit by a cloudburst, which caused minor floods.

The long-time effects of the drought and the persistent bad weather prevented the soil from draining; by 16 May, another storm—known as Storm Minerva—hit the region with uninterrupted heavy rain for almost two days. Twenty-three rivers across the region burst their banks. Fifteen people were killed during the floods; seven people died between Cesena and Forlì, seven died in Ravenna, and another one in San Lazzaro di Savena, near Bologna. Damages also occurred in the Apennine areas, with more than 400 landslides counted across the four Italian provinces. More than 50,000 people were displaced, with more than 4,800 of them finding temporary shelter in hotels and gyms indicated by local administrations.

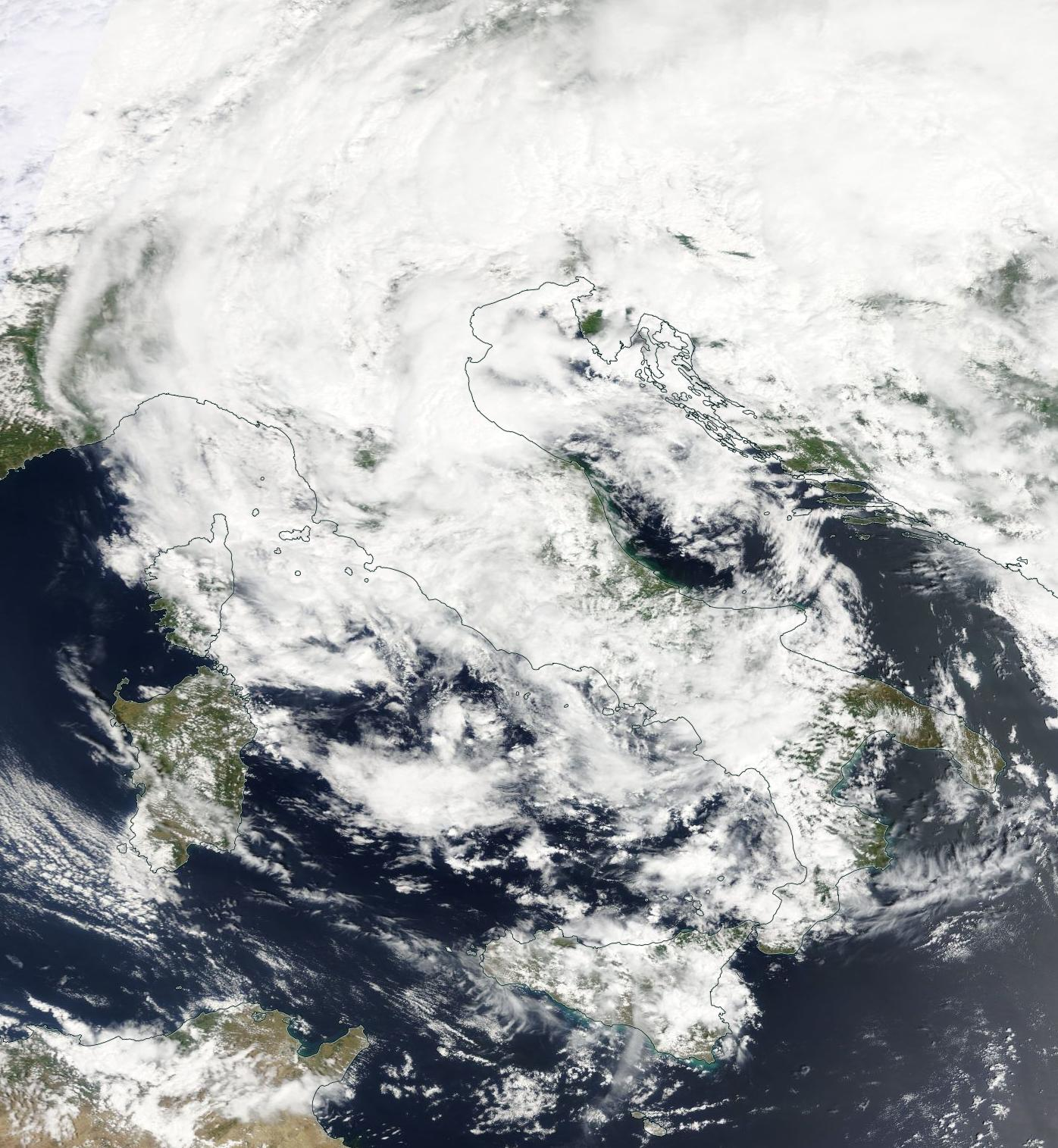
Storm Minerva on 16 May 2023

While the storm ended in the afternoon of 17 May, other floods occurred on the following days. Notably, the town of Lugo, near Ravenna, was completely flooded on the morning of 18 May, while Russi, in the same area, was evacuated on 19 May due to the overflow of the Emilia-Romagna Channel. On 19 May, rain started to fall again. On 20 May, alert remained high in the territory of Ravenna, where 36,000 people were evacuated.

On 26 May, the town of Conselice, in the province of Ravenna, was evacuated for health reasons, since the stagnant water that was still flooding large areas of the town was full of waste and garbage, and so could have become a vector for either viral or bacterial infections. On 27 May, Ferrovie dello Stato Italiane officially announced that access to the rail line between Bologna and Rimini, as well as the one between Faenza and Ravenna, would be fully restored from 29 May onwards, whilst the Ferrara–Ravenna–Rimini route would be completely re-activated on 30 May; all of the aforementioned lines stayed subject to variations and delays, since the standard number and top speed of vehicles available were set to be restored gradually.

== Effects ==
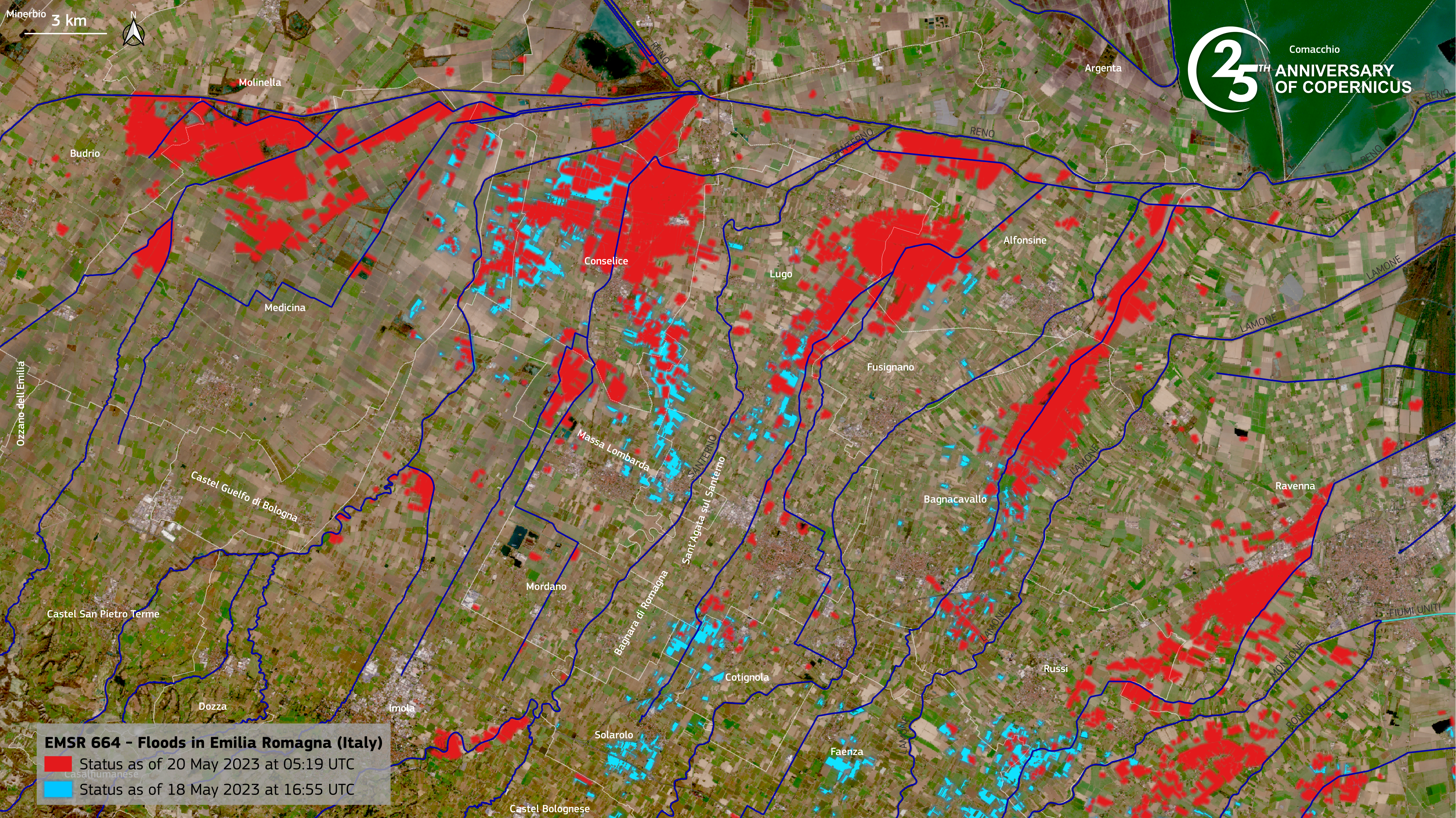
The extent of the floods on 18–20 May 2023

On 17 May, Stefano Bonaccini, the president of Emilia-Romagna, stated that "in the last 24 hours, more than 300 millimeters of rain have fallen", and described the floods as a "catastrophic event, never seen before". Later on, Bonaccini also compared the impact of the floods to the 2012 Emilia earthquakes, stating that the damage was likely to be less significant but would still cost the region several billions of euros.

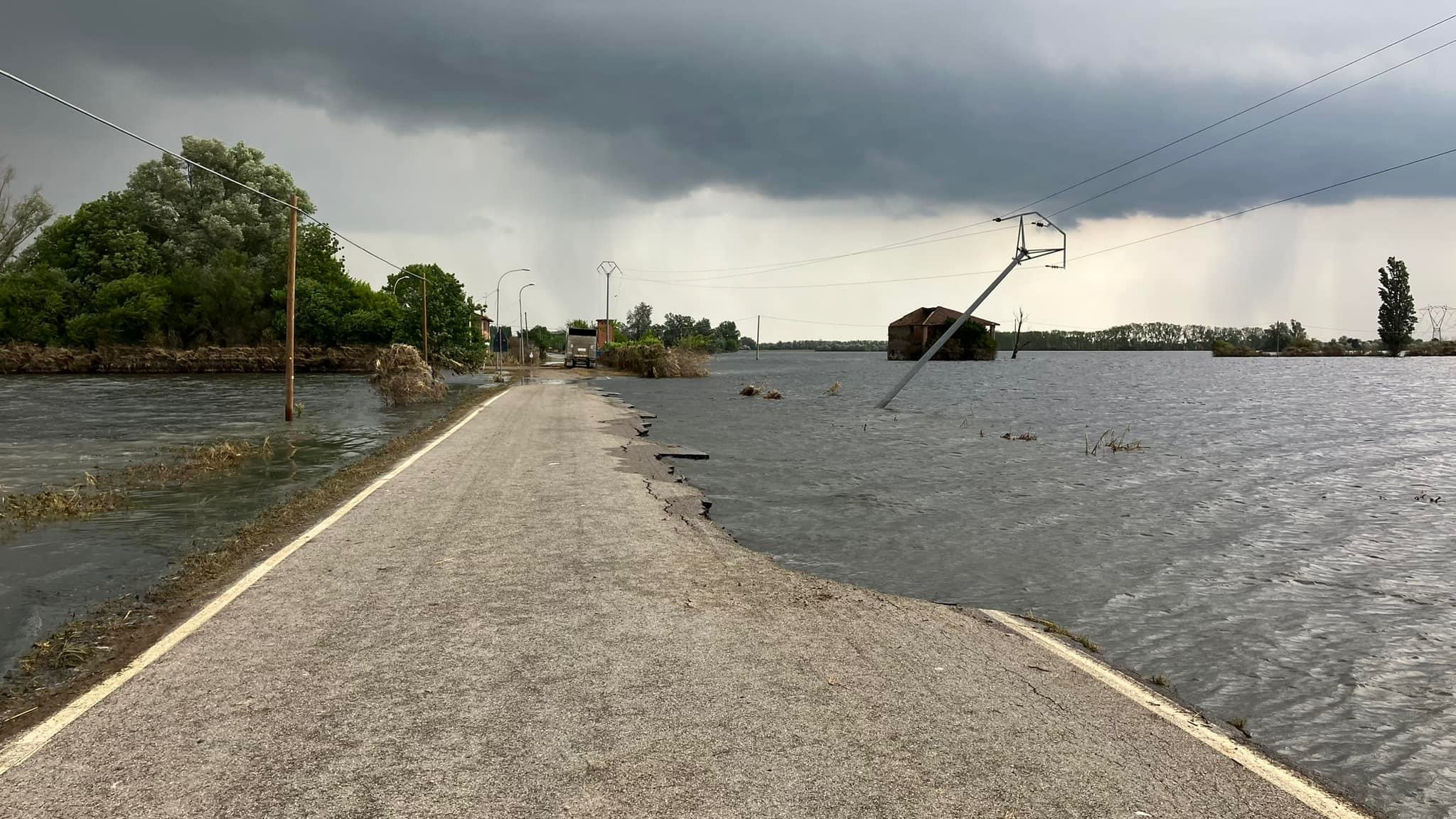
A flooded area in Molinella, Bologna

Luca Mercalli, president of the Italian Meteorological Society, stated that "two records were broken in 15 days in the same region. An event like the one that occurred on 2 May might happen once in a century, but then another one hit the same areas only 15 days later." Many events in the region were canceled or delayed due to the flooding. Throughout the Bologna metropolitan area, alongside many road closures, all schools and cultural activities were cancelled with people being strongly encouraged to work from home. The city's annual fun-run "StraBologna" was also postponed.

Frozen food company Orogel, based in Cesena, provided industrial-size freezers set at –25°C in order to store ancient books and manuscripts, some dating back to the 16th century, from several libraries in the worst-affected areas of Emilia-Romagna, including Forlì, San Benedetto in Cava, Lugo, and Sant'Agata sul Santerno, among other towns. The objective of the freezing process, which was usually used for ripe fruit and vegetables within three hours of harvesting, was to drain excess water from the books and prevent further damage, before drying and restoring them as soon as possible.

=== Emilia Romagna Grand Prix ===
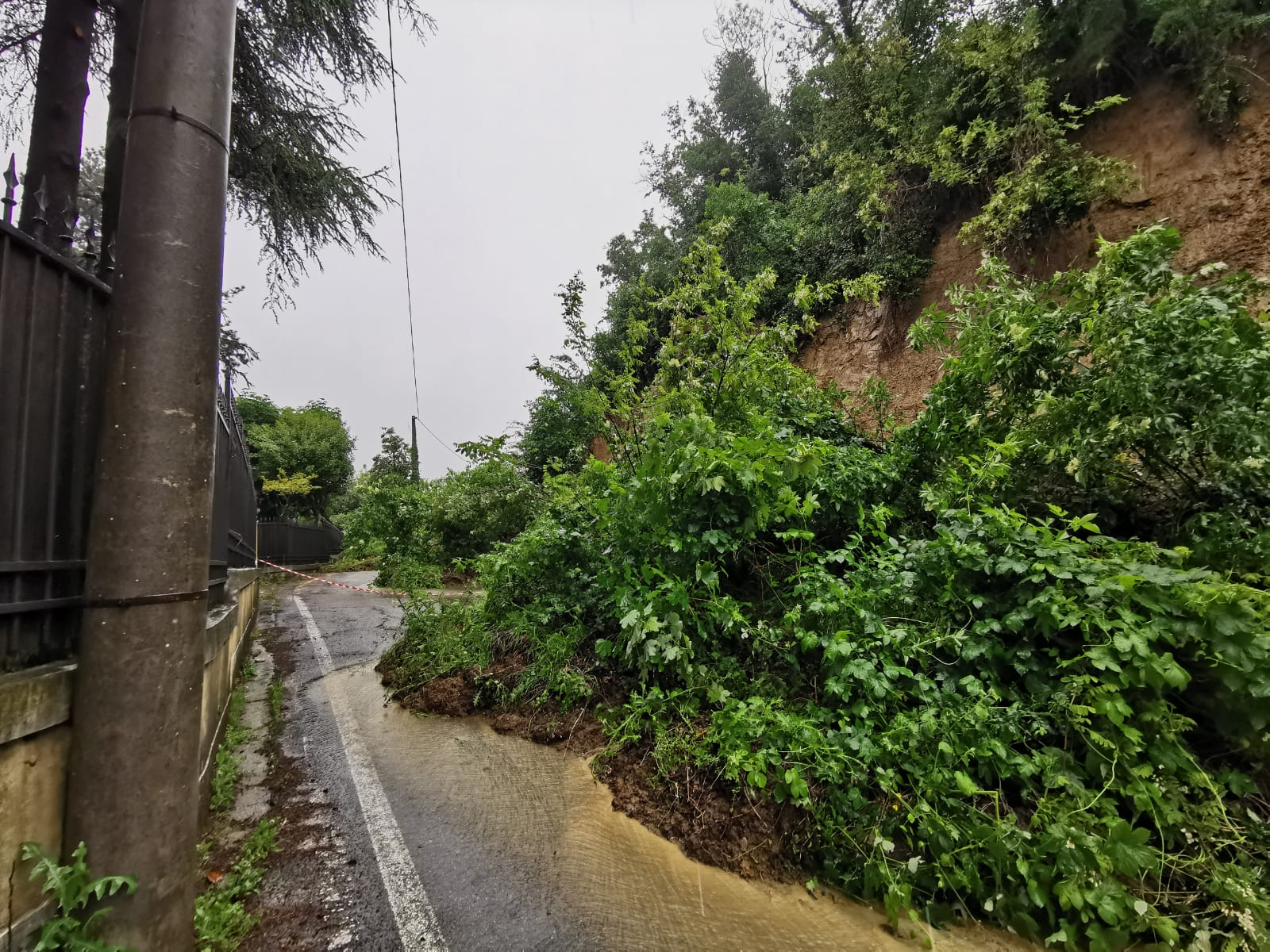
A landslide in Sasso Marconi, near Bologna

A Formula One race at the Autodromo Internazionale Enzo e Dino Ferrari in Imola was scheduled to be part of the 2023 Formula One World Championship and to be held from 19 to 21 May 2023. On 16 May, all Formula One personnel were instructed to leave the paddock, citing precautionary steps after a rise in water level at the nearby Santerno river was reported. Due to the heavy rain observed throughout the week before the race, and after several rumors the day before, the Italian ministry called for the race to be postponed. Ultimately, the race was cancelled; an official statement from Formula One stated that the decision was made as it was not possible to safely hold the event for fans, teams, and personnel, and to lighten the load on local emergency services as they had already been pressured due to the storm damage. The cancelled Grand Prix's trophies, Ferrari Trento celebration bottle, and related items were auctioned to raise relief funds for Emilia-Romagna.

=== Bruce Springsteen concert controversy ===
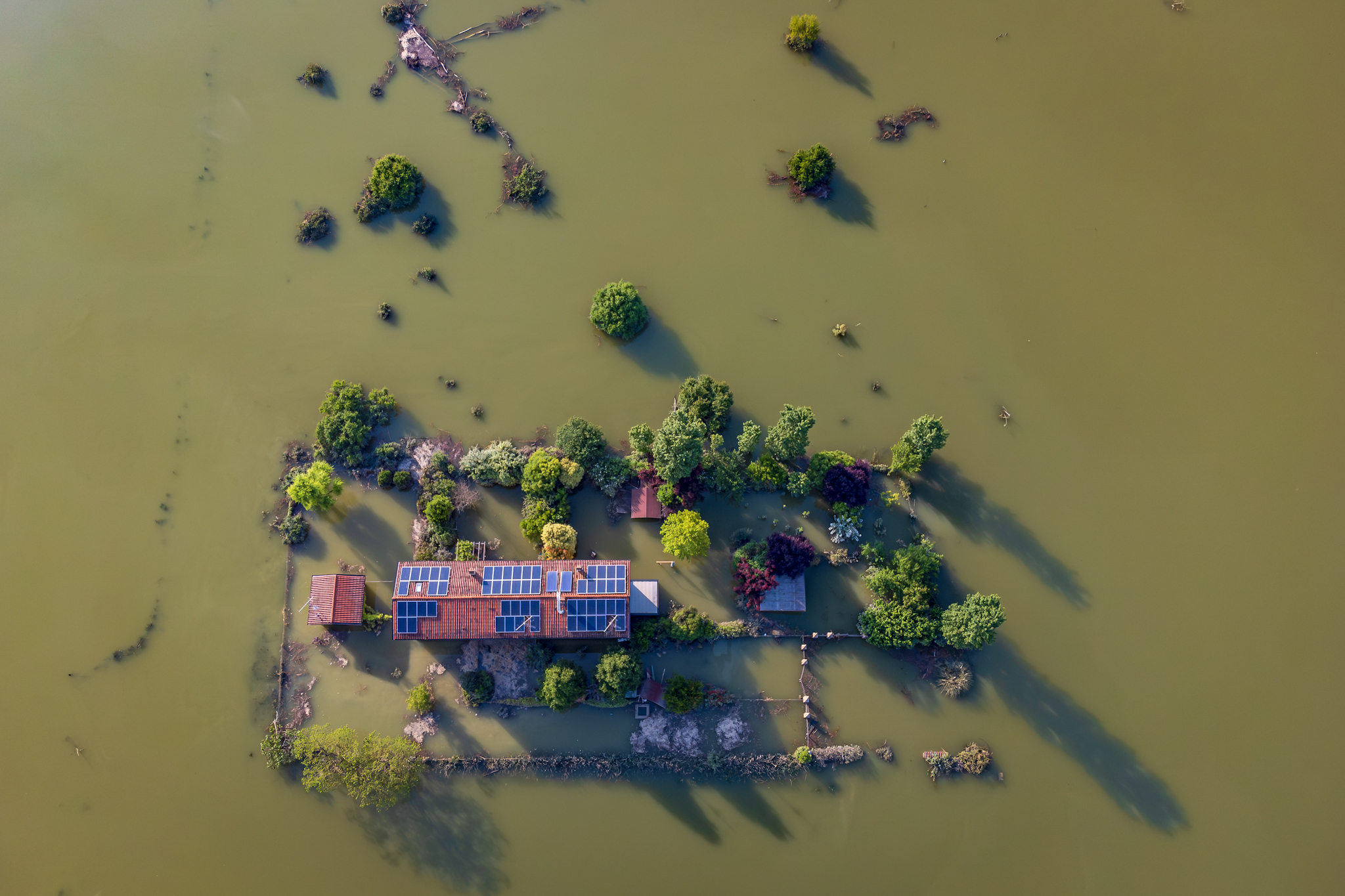
A flooded area in Romagna

On 18 May 2023, American singer-songwriter Bruce Springsteen and his E Street Band were set to perform at the Giorgio Bassani Urban Park in Ferrara as part of their 2023 world tour. Although the province of Ferrara was not between the areas directly affected by the floods, in the immediate aftermath of the disaster Springsteen fans and ticket-holders attempted to urge the organizers to reschedule the concert on social media in order to pay respect to the victims and avoid misplacement of emergency resources. After further examinations, both the Prefettura and the local council of Ferrara authorized Springsteen to go ahead with the concert.

The decision sparked heavy criticism towards Springsteen and his team, while both lead promoter Claudio Trotta and Alan Fabbri, the mayor of Ferrara, defended the choice to permit the show. Irene Priolo, the deputy vice-president of Protezione Civile for the Emilia-Romagna region, questioned the decision whilst clarifying that Ferrara's local authorities were the only institutions that had the right to either confirm or postpone the gig. During the concert, which reportedly involved 900 security members between police officers, volunteers, and first aid workers, Springsteen did not make any direct comments about the floods and their impact. On 26 May, Springsteen's guitarist Steven Van Zandt took to Twitter to answer a message from an Italian fan, stating that the band had not been informed of the emergency by anyone.

== Reactions ==
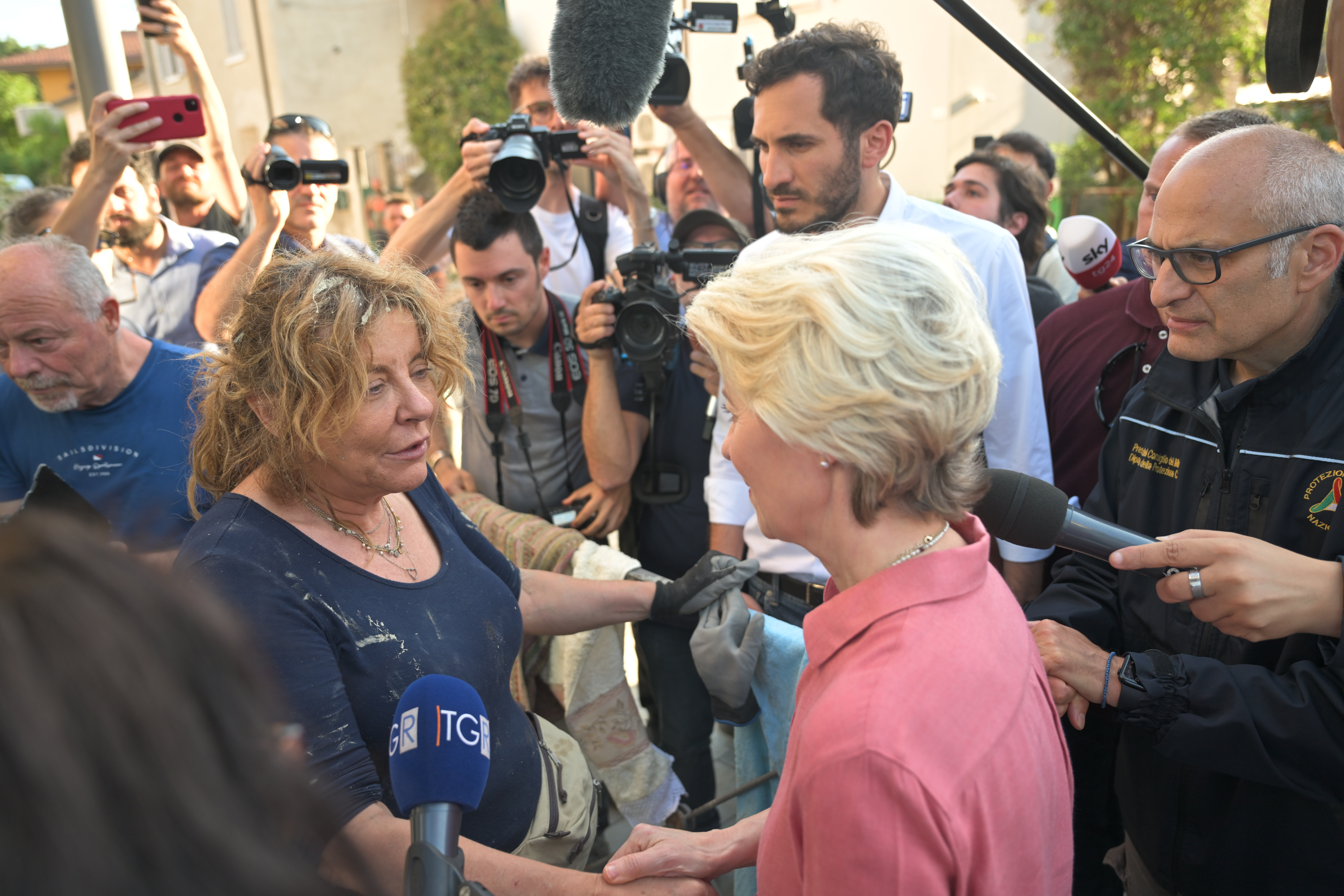
European Commission president Ursula von der Leyen speaking with a survivor in Cesena

Michele De Pascale, the mayor of Ravenna, called the floods the "worst disaster in a century", labeling the night between 16 and 17 May 2023 as the "worst one in the history of Romagna".

On the evening of 16 May, Matteo Salvini, the Deputy Prime Minister of Italy and Minister of Infrastructure and Transport, posted a tweet linking the tragic aftermath of the floods with the defeat of AC Milan (the team he was a supporter of) against Inter Milan in the 2023 UEFA Champions League semi-finals. He wrote: "Heart and commitment dedicated to the citizens of Emilia-Romagna who are fighting against water and mud. An AC Milan without heart, grit and ideas does not even deserve a thought." Salvini, who was set to be directly involved in the management of the emergency due to his political duties, later deleted the tweet but was nonetheless heavily criticized for his apparent lack of taste and empathy. The Democratic Party-led regional government was accused by several local members of right-wing parties, such as Brothers of Italy and Lega, of being directly responsible for the floods, allegedly due to poor maintenance of the rivers' banks.

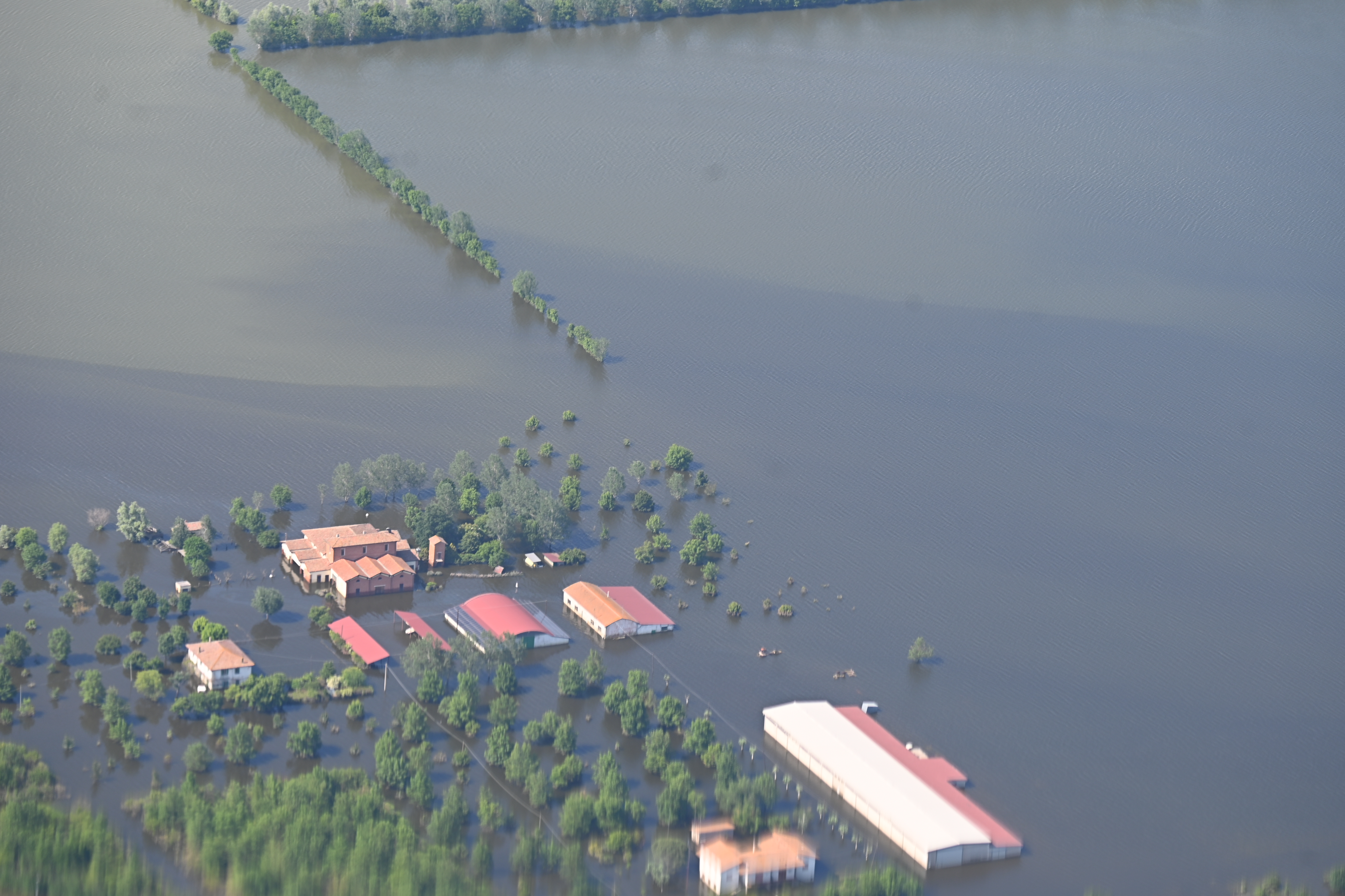
Aerial view of the floods near Ravenna

During an interview on Rai Radio 1 on 18 May, Gilberto Pichetto Fratin, the Minister of the Environment, announced that the Italian government would activate the state of calamity for all of the areas damaged by the flooding from 23 May onwards. The decision, which was set to receive an official approval by the Ministry of Agriculture, was aimed to help farm workers get easier access to indemnities and other economic measures. In the same interview, Pichetto Fratin announced the activation with immediate effect of a national economic recovery package, which would suspend the payment of taxes and loan agreements for all the citizens and businesses affected by the floods; he also previewed the introduction of a national plan of climate change adaptation, acknowledging the significant impact of climate change on the rising frequency of natural disasters in Italy and across the world.

On 20 May, Italian Prime Minister Giorgia Meloni officially announced that she would depart the 49th G7 summit in Hiroshima, Japan, early in order to return to Italy and help coordinate the emergency, stating that she "could not remain so far from Italy in such a complex moment". While departing, Meloni thanked fellow G7 leaders for their offers of aid to the victims of the floods. She landed in Rimini the following day, and visited the provinces of Forlì and Ravenna, as well as the city of Faenza, before meeting regional president Stefano Bonaccini and Fabrizio Curcio, the head of Protezione Civile, at the Prefettura of Ravenna.

Bonaccini's request to be named extraordinary commissioner to manage the relief funds, as was custom among regional presidents in Italy, was opposed by the Meloni government, in particular by Brothers of Italy and Lega; some regional presidents of the centre-right coalition, such as Roberto Occhiuto, Giovanni Toti, and Luca Zaia, sided with Bonaccini. On 7 June, Meloni hosted a meeting with Bonaccini and other administrators from the affected areas, stating that the emergency would be temporarily managed by an operative table between the national government and local institutions led by Nello Musumeci, the Minister for Civil Protection and Maritime Policies.

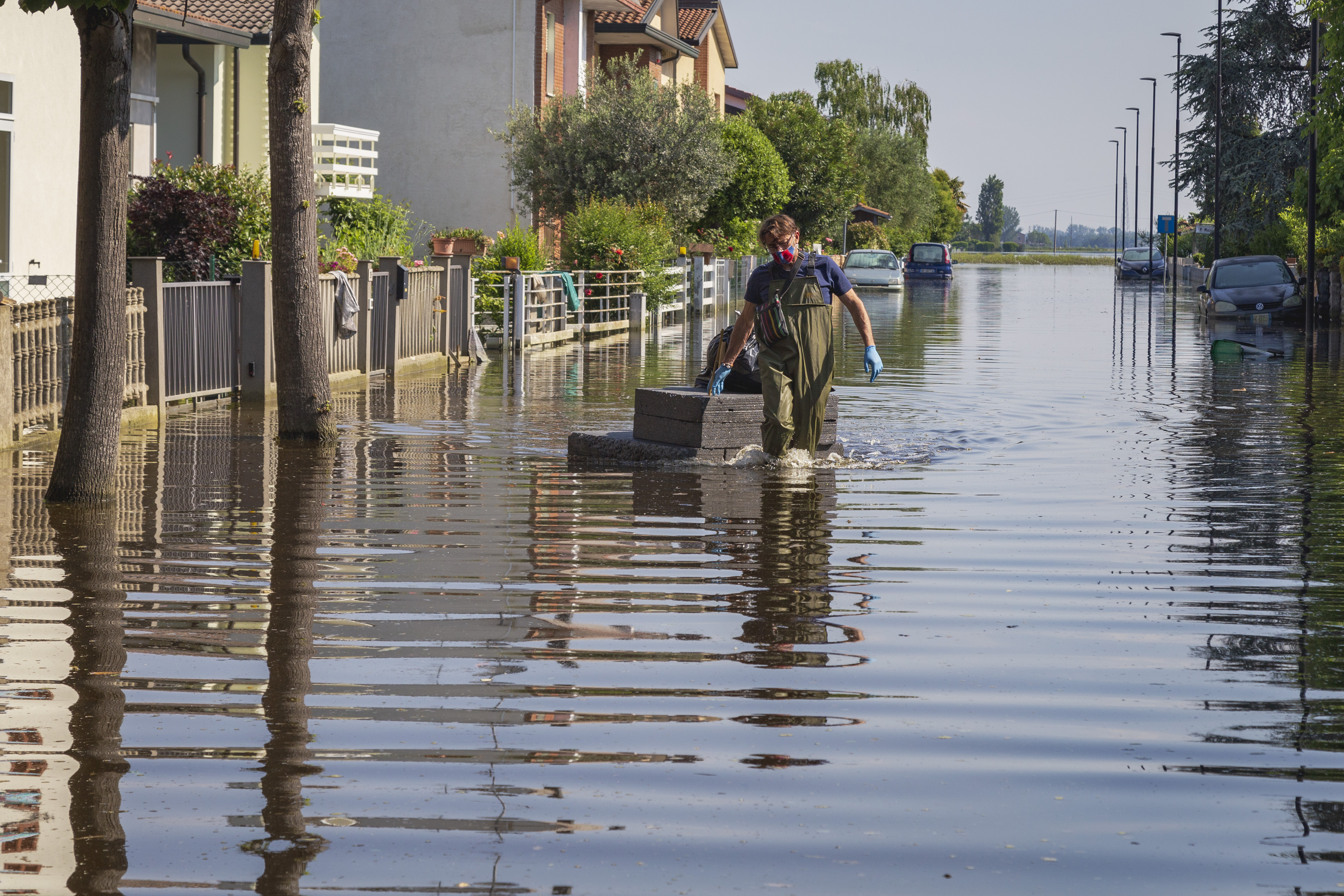
A man walking in a completely flooded street

On 23 May, Italy's Council of Ministers officially announced the approval of the first law decree in response to the emergency, an estimated €2.2 billion recovery package that was aimed to public and private businesses, schools, universities, museums, and farm workers, among other categories. The law's final text was eventually published on the Gazzetta Ufficiale on 1 June, and included an estimated €1.6 billion package, a lower budget than the one originally presented by the government. A €620 million-worth recovery fund for workers affected by the disaster was the largest investment included in the package; all of the measures were financed through cuts to other welfare systems, including the Salary Integration Fund, the Social Fund for Occupation and Formation, and the set-to-be-ceased citizens' income.

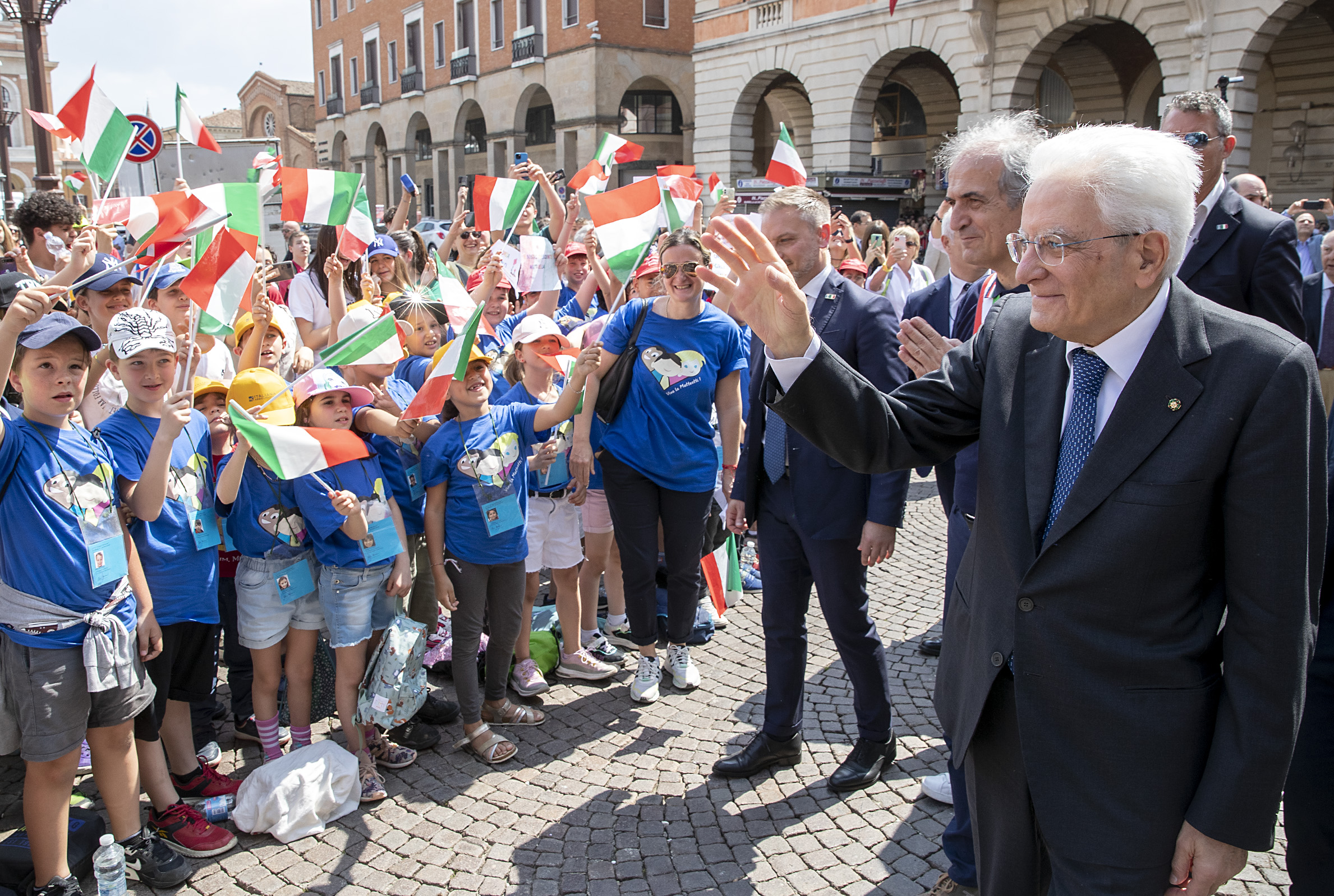
Italian President Sergio Mattarella visiting Forlì on 30 May

24 May was declared as National Day of Mourning for the victims of the flooding, as both the Italian and European flags hung outside of the Chamber of Deputies in Rome were displayed at half-mast. On 25 May, Meloni and Ursula von der Leyen, the president of the European Commission, visited the flooded areas along with Bonaccini. Von der Leyen assured that the European Union (EU) would help the region, adding in Romagnol dialect, Tin bota (English: "Stay strong"), which was widely used as the slogan for the ongoing reconstruction process. On 27 May, Italian President Sergio Mattarella publicly announced that he would visit the affected areas on 30 May. Throughout his trip, where he was accompanied by Bonaccini, Mattarella visited the comune of Modigliana, before reaching Forlì, and then heading to Cesena, Lugo, Ravenna, and Faenza.

After weeks of tension within the government and between majority and opposition parties, the Meloni cabinet officially appointed army corps general Francesco Paolo Figliuolo as Extraordinary Commissioner for the Reconstruction on 27 June 2023. Figliuolo, who had previously served as Extraordinary Commissioner for the COVID-19 pandemic in Italy under the Draghi government between March 2021 and March 2022, would retain his role for the following five years. In the same instance, Bonaccini, Francesco Acquaroli, and Eugenio Giani, the regional presidents of Marche and Tuscany (the other two adjacent regions affected by the floods), were all nominated as Sub-Commissioners for the Reconstruction. Bonaccini described the government's centralist choice as a wrong choice but said that he was ready to work together.

The same day of the Extraordinary Commissioner nomination, Musumeci announced that the Council of Ministers had approved a bill that aimed to simplify and standardize reconstruction plans for the territories affected by natural disasters, including floods, rockslides, earthquakes, and volcanic eruptions. During the press conference where he presented the bill, Musumeci stated: "If ten years ago I would have asked myself whether [what happened in Emilia-Romagna] would happen again, today I only ask myself 'when' [it will happen again], given climate change and the vulnerability of territories."

== Humanitarian efforts ==
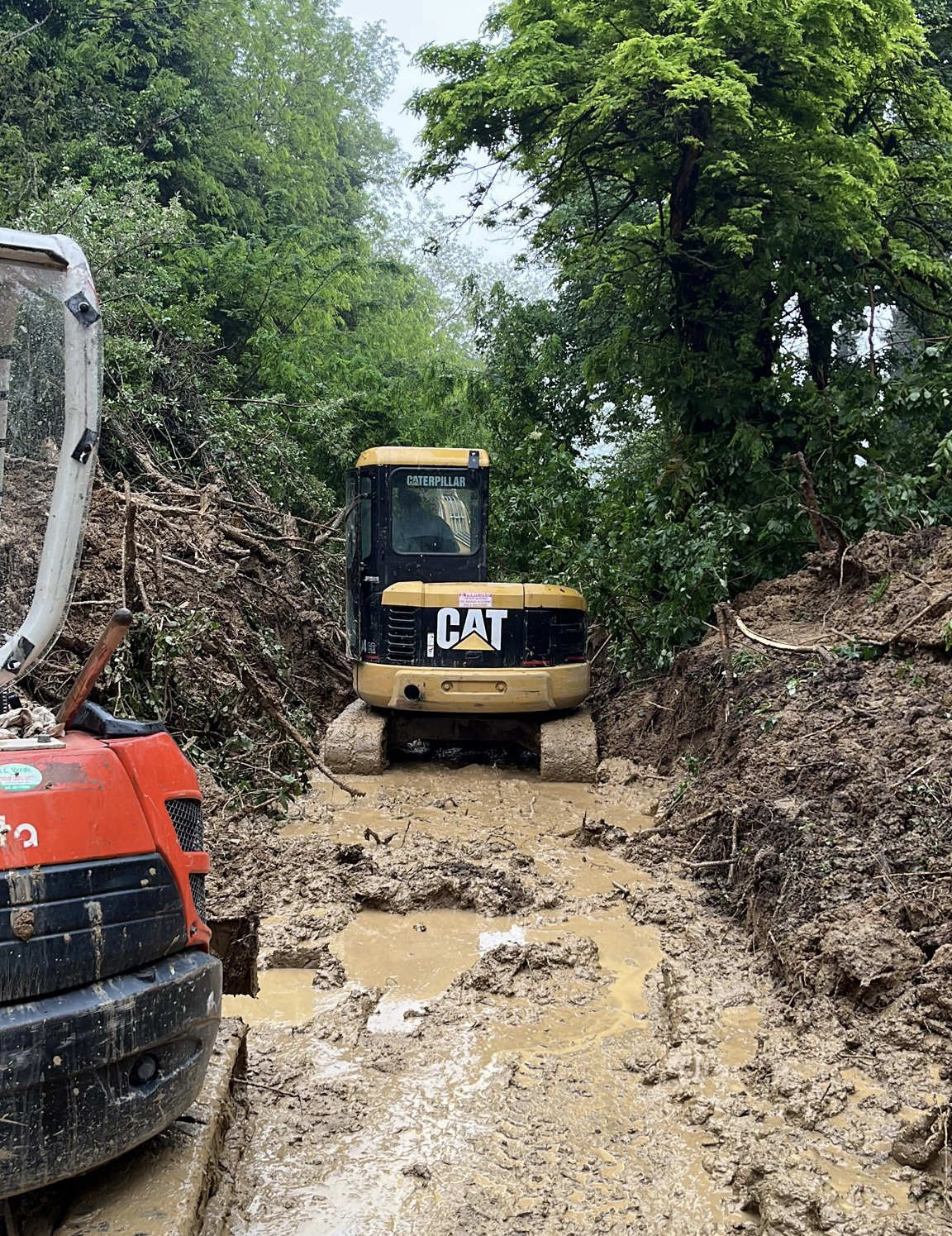
Clearing operations after a landslide near Bologna

The emergency operations throughout the region involved, among other human resources, members of Protezione Civile, the Italian Red Cross, and various armed and police forces, including Italy's Army, Navy, Air Force, and Carabinieri. State-owned energy company Enel created a task-force that would co-operate with local institutions to repair and restore the electricity distribution systems left damaged by the floods. Matteo Lepore, the mayor of Bologna, shared on social media a public Google Form aimed to all of the civil volunteers who wanted to take part in the operations. Players and staff members of Cesena FC volunteered to help citizens in several areas of the city, which was directly hit by the flood. Several members of Formula One team AlphaTauri, including driver Yuki Tsunoda, actively helped on the scenes, while several other drivers, such as Lando Norris, Max Verstappen, and Felipe Drugovich, raised charity funds via video game livestreaming. Scuderia Ferrari and Formula One each donated €1 million to both the Territorial Security Agency and Protezione Civile.

On 19 May, the Regional Council of Emilia-Romagna officially opened a public bank account in order to raise funds for the emergency from everyone across Italy (through an IBAN code) and abroad (via SWIFT). Public donors to the charity account included professional football clubs Bologna, Cremonese, Parma, Modena, and Rimini. The Italian Red Cross opened a charity fundraising campaign, as several local institutions did the same, including the local councils of Modena, Faenza, Imola, and Forlì. Other parallel campaigns were kickstarted by the Mirror of Italy Foundation, a non-governmental organization affiliated to the GEDI Media Group, and Monrif; this last campaign reportedly received offers by several high-profile figures born in the region, including Conferenza Episcopale Italiana president Matteo Zuppi, singer-songwriters Francesco Guccini and Cesare Cremonini, comedian Giuseppe Giacobazzi, actress Martina Colombari, and politician Pier Ferdinando Casini.

On 22 May, the EU Civil Protection Mechanism deployed high-capacity pumping station teams from Slovakia and Slovenia to help Italian authorities deal with the floods all across the region; Austria, Belgium, Bulgaria, France, Germany, Poland, and Romania also responded to Italy's request for assistance. The EU's Copernicus Programme provided satellite mapping of the affected areas, following a request from Protezione Civile on 16 May.

On 2 June, New Zealand actor Russell Crowe, who was set to perform with his band, Indoor Garden Party, in Bologna on 27 June, announced via Twitter that he agreed with the organizers of the concert to donate the full revenue to the victims of the floods. On 6 June, Parma-based food company Barilla announced an official €1 million donation to Protezione Civile in order to help the reconstruction of sport facilities in the communes of Sant'Agata sul Santerno and Conselice, as well as other infrastructures.

== See also ==
- 2021 European floods
- 2024 European floods#Italy
- Weather of 2023
