= Ravenna (disambiguation) =

Ravenna is a city in Italy. It may also refer to:

== Places ==
- Ravenna, Ontario, a community in the Blue Mountains, Canada
- Ravenna Gorge, a side valley of Hell Valley in the Black Forest, Germany
- Province of Ravenna, Italy

=== United States ===
- Ravenna, Kentucky
- Ravenna, Michigan
- Ravenna (Natchez, Mississippi), listed on the National Register of Historic Places
- Ravenna, Nebraska
- Ravenna, Ohio
  - Ravenna Training and Logistics Site or Ravenna Arsenal, a nearby military base
- Ravenna, Texas
- Ravenna, Seattle, Washington
  - Ravenna Creek, a Seattle stream
- Ravenna Township (disambiguation)

== People ==
- John of Ravenna (disambiguation)
- Ravenna (surname)
- Ravenna Helson (1925–2020), American psychologist

== Other ==
- Ravenna (album), the first studio album by alternative rock band The Reason
- Ravenna (butterfly), a genus of butterflies in the family Lycaenidae
- Ravenna (networking), a media-over-IP networking technology
- Ravenna F.C. Italian football club based in Ravenna, Italy
- Ravenna Cosmography, a 7th-century map of the known world
- 3rd Infantry Division "Ravenna", an Italian division of World War II
- "Ravenna", an 1878 poem by Oscar Wilde
- Ravenna (Centuria), fictional village doctor in the Japanese web manga Centuria

== See also ==
- Battle of Ravenna (disambiguation), a list of battles occurring near the city
- Ravena, New York, a village in Albany County
- Ravana, a person in the Hindu epic Ramayana
- Ravonna, a character in the Marvel Comics
