= Siege of Ravenna =

Siege of Ravenna may refer to:

- Siege of Ravenna (425)
- Siege of Ravenna (490–493), in which Theoderic the Great besieged Odoacer
- Siege of Ravenna (539–540), in which the Eastern Roman Empire besieged Vitiges
- Siege of Ravenna (1240)

== See also ==
- Battle of Ravenna
