= Gabriele Albonetti =

Italian politician (born 1951)

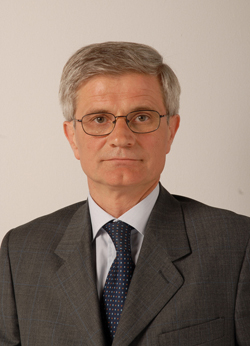

Quaestor of the Chamber of Deputies
- In office 4 May 2006 – 14 March 2013

Member of the Chamber of Deputies
- In office 30 May 2001 – 14 March 2013

President of the Province of Ravenna
- In office 23 June 1993 – 14 May 2001
- Preceded by: Dante Maioli
- Succeeded by: Francesco Giangrandi

Personal details
- Born: 4 September 1951 (age 75) Faenza, Province of Ravenna, Italy
- Party: PCI (until 1991); PDS (1991–1998); DS (1998–2007); PD (from 2007)
- Occupation: Public employee

Gabriele Albonetti (born 4 September 1951) is an Italian politician who served as a member of the Chamber of Deputies from 2001 to 2013 and as a quaestor of the Chamber from 2006 to 2013. He also served as president of the Province of Ravenna from 1993 to 2001.
