= Torchi =

Torchi is a surname. Notable people with the surname include:

- Angiolo Torchi (1856–1915), Italian painter
- Luigi Torchi (inventor) (1812–?), Italian inventor
- Luigi Torchi (musician) (1858–1920), Italian musicologist
