= Valentina Palli =

Italian politician (born 1985)

President of the Province of Ravenna
- Incumbent
- Assumed office 2 March 2025
- Preceded by: Michele De Pascale

Mayor of Russi
- Incumbent
- Assumed office 27 May 2019
- Preceded by: Sergio Retini

Personal details
- Born: 18 April 1985 (age 41)
- Party: Democratic Party

Valentina Palli (born 18 April 1985) is an Italian politician serving as president of the province of Ravenna since 2025. She has served as mayor of Russi since 2019.
