= Angelo Torchi =

Italian painter 1856–1915

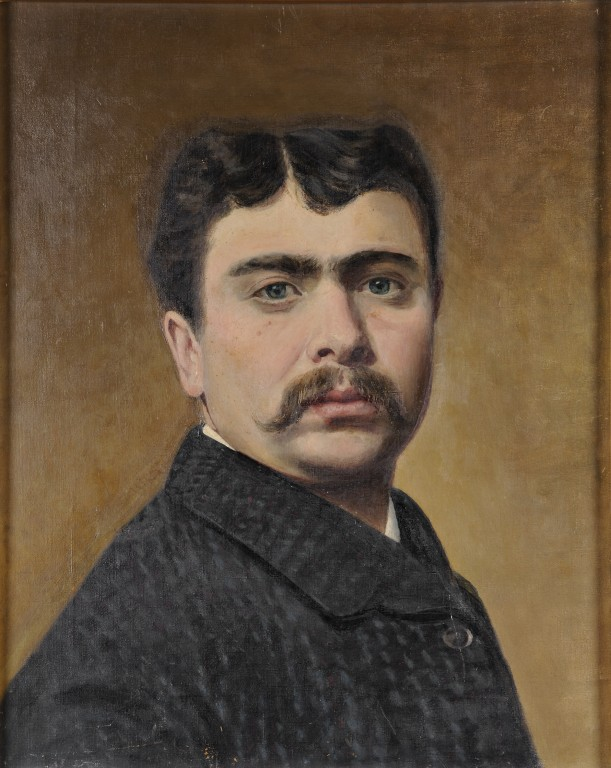
Angelo Torchi, self portrait

Angiolo Torchi (Massa Lombarda, Lombardy, 1856 – 1915) was an Italian painter mainly of landscapes. He is also known as Angiolo Torchi.

He began his studies at Florence under professor Lorenzo Gelati. He then moved to Naples to work with Alceste Campriani. He painted his landscapes and figures outdoors. He frequently exhibited at the Promotrice of Florence. Angelo Torchi also exhibited in Milan in 1881, Rome in 1883, Turin in 1884, Venice, Bologna and Paris.

Among his works were studies of Canals in Venice and Under the Grapevines in Capri. He did various studies on Vedute of Mergellina. Among his genre works is In risaia dopo il raccolto. To an Exposition of Paris he displayed a study of a Roman Peasant. Over time he painted numerous studies of the Arno in Florence, the Gabbro near Livorno, the railway line of the Apennine Porrettano and of the Maremma Toscana. He also painted portraits. Other works include Sotto la pineta, A Mergellina, Alle Cascine (June Morning), Dopo il raccolto, March Sun, Naples alla villa reale, Livorno on the Beach, Near Massa Lombarda, Marine Study a Castiglioncello, Nel greto del Mugnone, Alla Porretta in July, San Vincenzo, July Morning and Via Lorenzo il Magnifico in Florence. By the 1891 Exhibition of the Promotrice of Florence, his technique reflected impressionistic styles. In 1891 he displayed Impressions of a Market, Fra settembre e ottobre, Along the canal of Massa Lombarda, Ulivi siti mare, Riso sull' Aia, Last Rays of Sunlight, Forte San Giuliano (Genoa) and Pergolato sul mare.
