= Conselice =

- Comune
- Comune di Conselice
- Coat of arms

- Conselice within the Province of Ravenna

- Location within Italy Location within Emilia-Romagna
- Coordinates: 44°20′N 11°42′E
- Country: Italy
- Region: Emilia-Romagna
- Province: Ravenna (RA)
- Frazioni: Borgo Serraglio, Chiesanuova, Lavezzola, San Patrizio

Government
  - Mayor: Paola Pula (Partito Democratico)

Area
  - Total: 60 km^{2} (23 sq mi)
- Elevation: 9 m (30 ft)

Population (30 April 2010)
  - Total: 9,920
  - Density: 170/km^{2} (430/sq mi)
- Demonym: Conselicesi
- Time zone: UTC+1 (CET)
  - Summer (DST): UTC+2 (CEST)
- Postal code: 48017
- Dialing code: 0545
- Patron saint: Saint Martin
- Saint day: November 11
- Website: Official website

Conselice (Romagnol: Cunsëls) is a town and comune of about 10,000 people located in the Po River Valley, part of the province of Ravenna, Emilia-Romagna, Italy.

== History ==
Originally it was a Roman harbor (known in Latin as Caput Silicis, literally "At the end of Via Silicis") important for the trade with Spina, an ancient Etruscan city, and located at the end of Via Sicilis, a Roman paved road intersecting the Via Emilia. The first written document mentioning the city as the portus de capite selcis dates to 1084. From 1395 to 1598 it was ruled by the House of Este, and subsequently was part of the Papal States until the unification of Italy in 1861.

== Geography ==
Conselice borders with the municipalities of Alfonsine, Argenta (FE), Imola (BO), Lugo and Massa Lombarda. It counts 4 hamlets (frazioni): Borgo Serraglio, Chiesanuova, Lavezzola and San Patrizio.

== Personalities ==
Conselice is the birthplace of the poet and revolutionary Eleuterio Felice Foresti, later a professor at Columbia University and University of the City of New York (1842) and United States consulate general in Genoa (1856). Two local public schools are dedicated to him. The Italian partisan Ines Bedeschi, Gold Medal of Honor for Military Valor, and killed by the Nazis during the patriotic war 1943–45, was also born in Conselice in 1911.

== Twin towns ==
- Bourgoin-Jallieu, France
- Velika Plana, Serbia
- Bitritto, Italy
