= Ravenna (surname) =

Ravenna is an Italian surname. Notable people with the surname include:

- Domenico Ravenna (1584–1637), Catholic prelate and Bishop of Nicastro
- Gino Ravenna (1889–1944), Italian gymnast
- Juti Ravenna (1897–1972), Italian painter
- Luca Ravenna (born 1987), Italian comedian and television writer
- Pia Ravenna (1894–1964), Finnish coloratura soprano
- Pierfelice Ravenna (born 1938), Chilean botanist
- Renzo Ravenna (1893–1961), Italian lawyer and politician
- Ruggero Ravenna (1925–2022), Italian trade unionist and syndicalist
- Verónica María Ravenna (born 1998), Argentine luger

== See also ==
- Ravenna (disambiguation)
