= Sant'Agata sul Santerno =

- Comune
- Comune di Sant'Agata sul Santerno
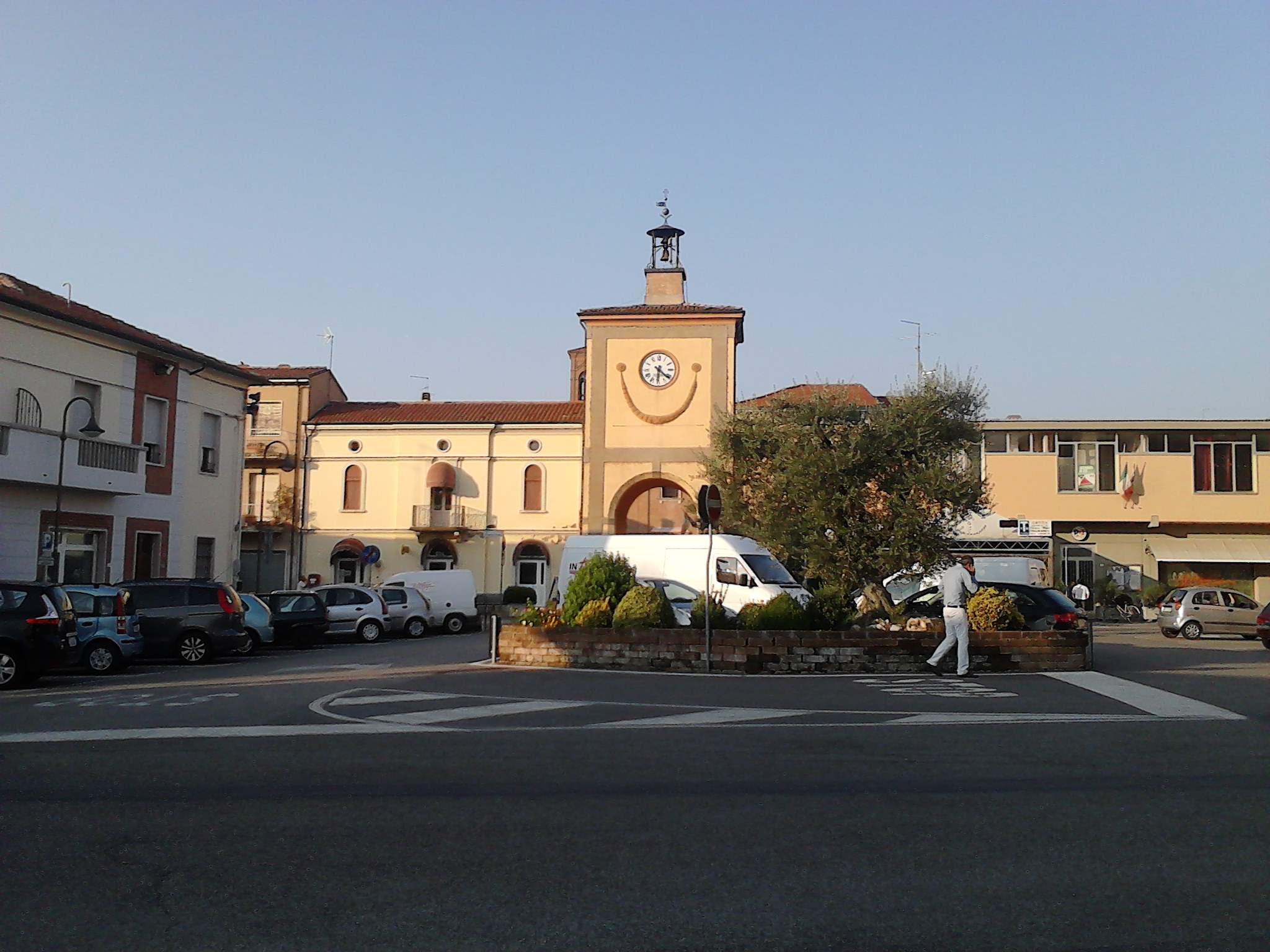

- Location within Italy Location within Emilia-Romagna
- Coordinates: 44°26′N 11°52′E
- Country: Italy
- Region: Emilia-Romagna
- Province: Ravenna (RA)

Government
  - Mayor: Enea Emiliani

Area
  - Total: 9.5 km^{2} (3.7 sq mi)
- Elevation: 14 m (46 ft)

Population (30 November 2016)
  - Total: 2,873
  - Density: 300/km^{2} (780/sq mi)
- Demonym: Santagatesi
- Time zone: UTC+1 (CET)
  - Summer (DST): UTC+2 (CEST)
- Postal code: 48020
- Dialing code: 0545
- Website: Official website

Sant'Agata sul Santerno (Romagnol: Sant'Êgta) is a comune in the Province of Ravenna in the Italian region Emilia-Romagna, located about 40 kilometres (25 mi) east of Bologna and about 25 kilometres (16 mi) west of Ravenna, bordering the municipalities of Lugo and Massa Lombarda.
