= Battle of Ravenna =

Battle of Ravenna may refer to:

- Battle of Ravenna (432), in which Aetius and Bonifatius waged a civil war in the Western Roman Empire
- Battle of Ravenna (475), between Orestes and Julius Nepos
- Battle of Ravenna (476), in which Odoacer captured Ravenna and brought the Western Roman Empire to an end
- Battle of Ravenna (729), between the Byzantine Empire and the Italians
- Battle of Ravenna (1512), between the French and Spanish-Papal during the War of the League of Cambrai

== See also ==
- Siege of Ravenna
