= List of presidents of the Province of Ravenna =

President of the Province of Ravenna
- Presidente della Provincia di Ravenna
- Incumbent; Valentina Palli since 2 March 2025
- Term length: 4 years
- Inaugural holder: Ruggero Fabri
- Formation: 1889

The president of the Province of Ravenna is the head of the provincial government in Ravenna, Emilia-Romagna, Italy. The president oversees the administration of the province, coordinates the activities of the municipalities, and represents the province in regional and national matters.

Since March 2025, the office has been held by Valentina Palli of the Democratic Party.

== List ==
=== Presidents of the Provincial Deputation (1889–1926) ===
Nº	Portrait	Name	Term		Party
Nº	Portrait	Name	Start	End	Party
1		Ruggero Fabri	1889	1902	
2		Carlo Ghigi	1902	1905	
3		Pietro Cagnoni	1906	1908	
(2)		Carlo Ghigi	1908	1920	
4		Bindo Giacomo Caletti	1920	1921	Italian Socialist Party

=== Presidents of the Provincial Deputation (1945–1951) ===
Nº	Portrait	Name	Term		Party
Nº	Portrait	Name	Start	End	Party
1		Bindo Giacomo Caletti	1945	1951	Italian Socialist Party

=== Presidents of the Province (1951–present) ===
Nº	Portrait	Name	Term		Party
Nº	Portrait	Name	Start	End	Party
1		Bindo Giacomo Caletti	1951	18 May 1965	Italian Socialist Party
2		Giuseppe Gambi	18 May 1965	22 February 1968	Italian Socialist Party
3		Decimo Triossi	1970	1973	Italian Communist Party
3		Decimo Triossi	1973	14 July 1975	Italian Communist Party
4		Ettore Zannoni	14 July 1975	29 June 1979	Italian Communist Party
5		Mario Li Vigni	29 June 1979	1985	Italian Communist Party
6		Adriano Guerrini	1985	27 July 1988	Italian Communist Party
7		Giannantonio Mingozzi	27 July 1988	18 December 1990	Italian Republican Party
8		Mauro Fantini	18 December 1990	22 October 1991	Italian Republican Party
9		Dante Maioli	22 October 1991	22 June 1993	Italian Socialist Party
10		Gabriele Albonetti	23 June 1993	2 May 1997	Democratic Party of the Left; Democrats of the Left
10		Gabriele Albonetti	2 May 1997	14 May 2001	Democratic Party of the Left; Democrats of the Left
11		Francesco Giangrandi	14 May 2001	6 June 2006	The Daisy; Democratic Party
11		Francesco Giangrandi	6 June 2006	16 May 2011	The Daisy; Democratic Party
12		Claudio Casadio	16 May 2011	4 August 2016	Democratic Party
13		Michele De Pascale	4 August 2016	19 December 2021	Democratic Party
13		Michele De Pascale	19 December 2021	25 November 2024	Democratic Party
–		Valentina Palli	25 November 2024	2 March 2025	Democratic Party
14		Valentina Palli	2 March 2025	Incumbent	Democratic Party

== Sources ==
- "Storia amministrativa dell'ente". Ministero dell'Interno.
- Menichini, Piera (2005). "I presidenti delle Province dall'Unità alla Grande guerra: repertorio analitico". Storia Amministrazione Costituzione (13): 280–281.
