= Eleuterio Felice Foresti =

Italian patriot and scholar (1789–1858)

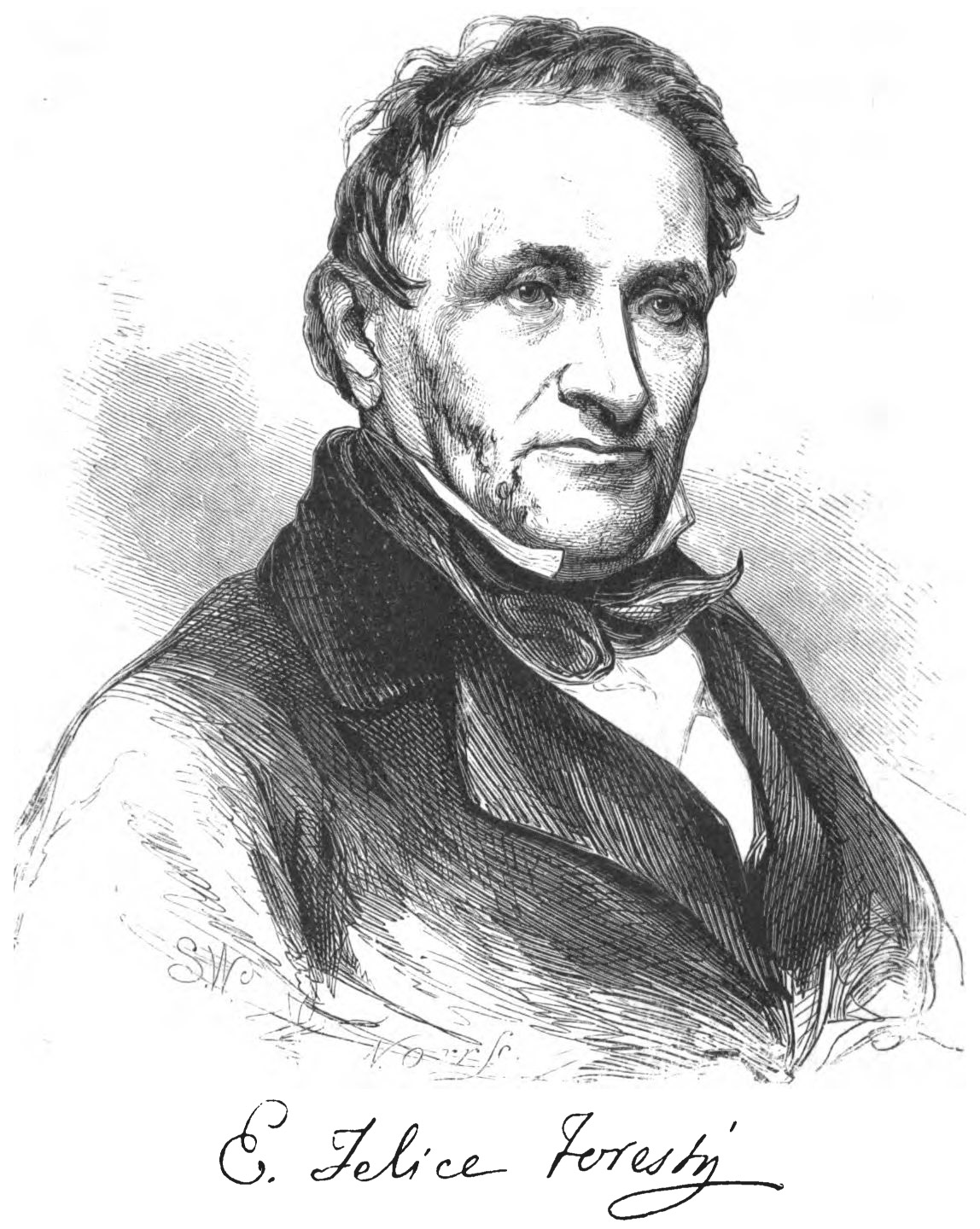

Eleuterio Felice Foresti (1789 – 14 September 1858) was an Italian patriot and scholar.

== Biography ==
He was born at Conselice, graduated at the University of Bologna, practiced law at Ferrara, and in 1816 was made praetor at Crespino and became prominent in politics. In 1816, he also joined the Carbonari. As a consequence, in 1819 he was arrested.

After two years in Piombi dungeon, and an unsuccessful attempt to take his own life, he was condemned to die on the public square of Venice, but when, with others, he was taken out for execution, the sentence was changed to “carcere duro” in Spielberg fortress for 20 years. In 1836, shortly after the death of Emperor Francis I of Austria, Foresti and others were liberated, but condemned to perpetual exile in the United States.

In the United States, Foresti was for over 20 years professor of Italian in Columbia College. During much of this time, he held a similar title at the University of the City of New York. He took an interest in Young Italy, and became the official representative of Giuseppe Mazzini in the United States. He took up residence in Italy (Piedmont) again in 1856. In 1858 he was appointed United States consul at Genoa, where he died.

== Works ==
He published an edition of Ollendorff's Italian grammar (1846), and Crestomazia italiana (1846). He wrote “Twenty Years in the Dungeons of Austria,” for the Watchman and Crusader in 1856.
