= Michele De Pascale =

Italian politician (born 1985)

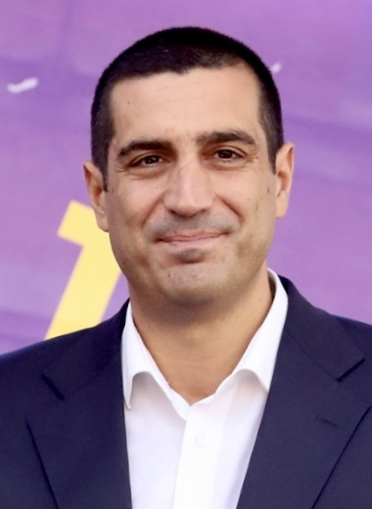
- De Pascale in 2024

President of Emilia-Romagna
- Incumbent
- Assumed office 13 December 2024
- Preceded by: Stefano Bonaccini

Mayor of Ravenna
- In office 21 June 2016 – 13 December 2024
- Preceded by: Fabrizio Matteucci
- Succeeded by: Alessandro Barattoni

President of the Province of Ravenna
- In office 4 September 2016 – 25 November 2024
- Preceded by: Claudio Casadio
- Succeeded by: Valentina Palli

Personal details
- Born: 20 January 1985 (age 41) Cesena, Emilia-Romagna, Italy
- Party: DS (2004–2007); PD (since 2007)
- Spouse: Laura Casadio (m. 2013)
- Children: 2
- Profession: Employee

Michele De Pascale (born 20 January 1985) is an Italian politician, president of Emilia-Romagna region since 2024. He is a member of the Democratic Party and served as mayor of Ravenna from 21 June 2016 until 13 December 2024. He also served as President of the Province of Ravenna from 4 September 2016 to 25 November 2024.

== Political career ==
Michele De Pascale was born in Cesena to a family originally from the province of Salerno, in the Irno Valley. He became involved in politics during his high school years as a student representative for the Izquierda list at the Augusto Righi scientific lyceum in Cesena, from which he graduated in 2004. He subsequently enrolled in the faculty of Medicine, although he did not complete his studies.

At the 2004 municipal elections in Emilia-Romagna, De Pascale ran for the municipal council of Cervia on the Democrats of the Left (DS) list and was elected as a municipal councillor. During his term, he served on the budget committee and chaired the urban planning committee. In 2007, following the dissolution of the DS, he joined the Democratic Party (PD) and became a member of its National Assembly. Within the party, he supported the leaderships of both Pier Luigi Bersani and Matteo Renzi.

At the 2009 local elections in Emilia-Romagna, De Pascale was re-elected to the Cervia municipal council as a member of the PD. In 2011, he was appointed municipal assessor in the administration led by mayor Roberto Zoffoli, with responsibility for general affairs, legal affairs, European policies, coordination of European Union funding and programmes, tourism, territorial marketing, event coordination and public image, maritime state property, and port affairs. He remained in office until 22 November 2013. In the same year, De Pascale became provincial secretary of the Democratic Party in the Province of Ravenna.

=== Mayor of Ravenna ===
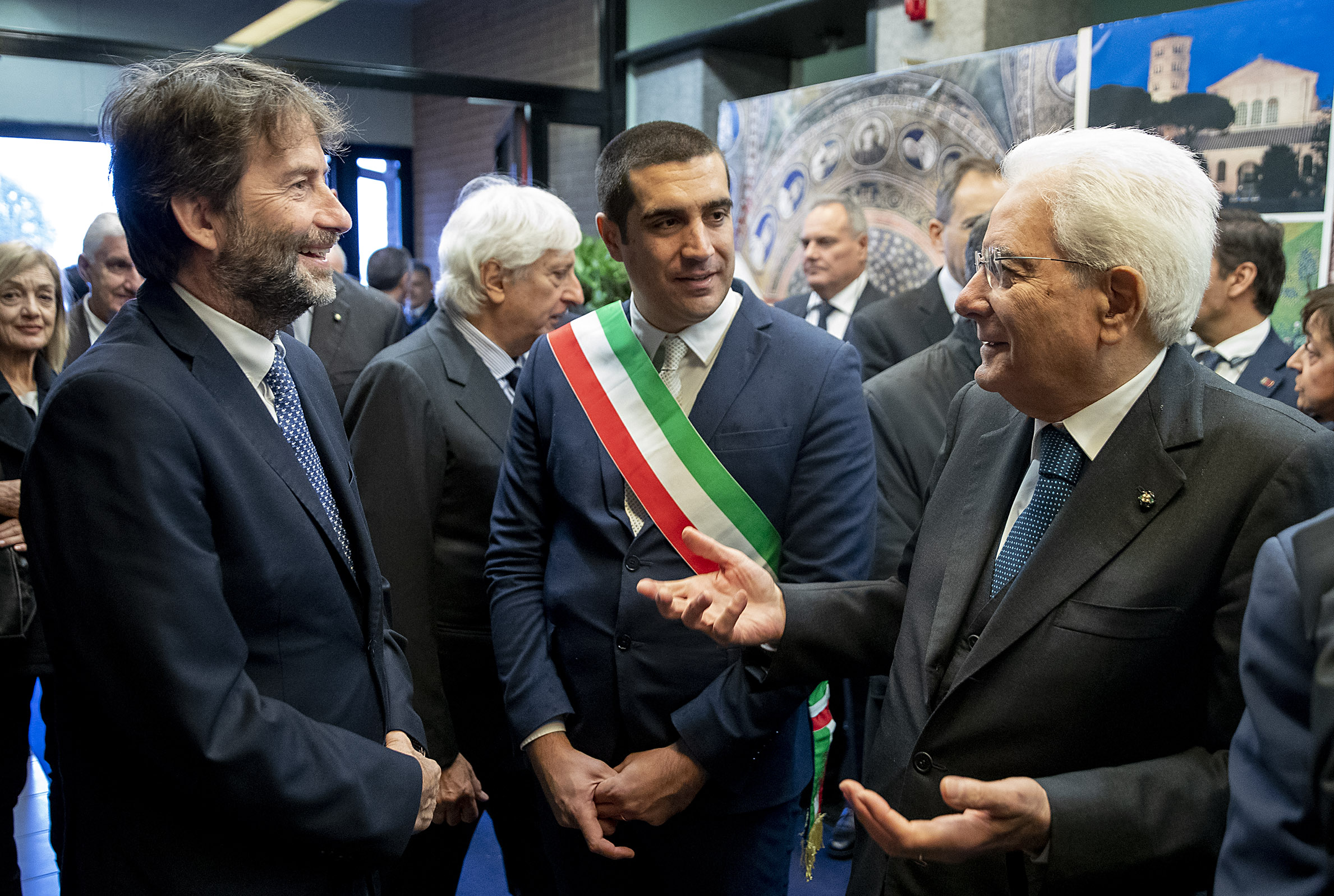
De Pascale with president Sergio Mattarella and minister Dario Franceschini in 2019

At the 2016 local elections, De Pascale was nominated as the centre-left coalition candidate for Mayor of Ravenna, replacing the original candidate, Enrico Liverani, who had died in a road accident a few months earlier. He was supported by a centre-left coalition composed of the PD, the Italian Republican Party (PRI), Italy of Values (IdV), and other civic lists. He received 46.5% of the vote in the first round and advanced to the runoff against the centre-right coalition candidate Massimiliano Alberghini, who obtained 27.97%. In the runoff held on 19 June, De Pascale was elected mayor with 53.32% of the vote, defeating Alberghini, who received 46.68%. On 3 August 2016, De Pascale was elected President of the Province of Ravenna with 78.82% of the vote. He took office on 4 September 2016 and was re-elected to the position on 19 December 2021.

Ahead of the 2019 PD leadership election, De Pascale signed an appeal together with approximately 200 mayors in support of the Piazza Grande platform promoted by Nicola Zingaretti, President of Lazio and the candidate with the longest administrative experience among the contenders. Zingaretti subsequently won the primary election with 66% of the vote.

At the 2021 local elections, De Pascale sought re-election as Mayor of Ravenna. He was supported by a broad coalition including the Democratic Party, the Five Star Movement, the Italian Republican Party, Ravenna Coraggiosa (comprising Article One and Italian Left), and other civic lists. He was re-elected in the first round with 59.47% of the vote.

During the 2023 PD leadership election, De Pascale supported the candidacy of Stefano Bonaccini, President of Emilia-Romagna, who was ultimately defeated by Democratic Party deputy Elly Schlein.

=== President of Emilia-Romagna ===
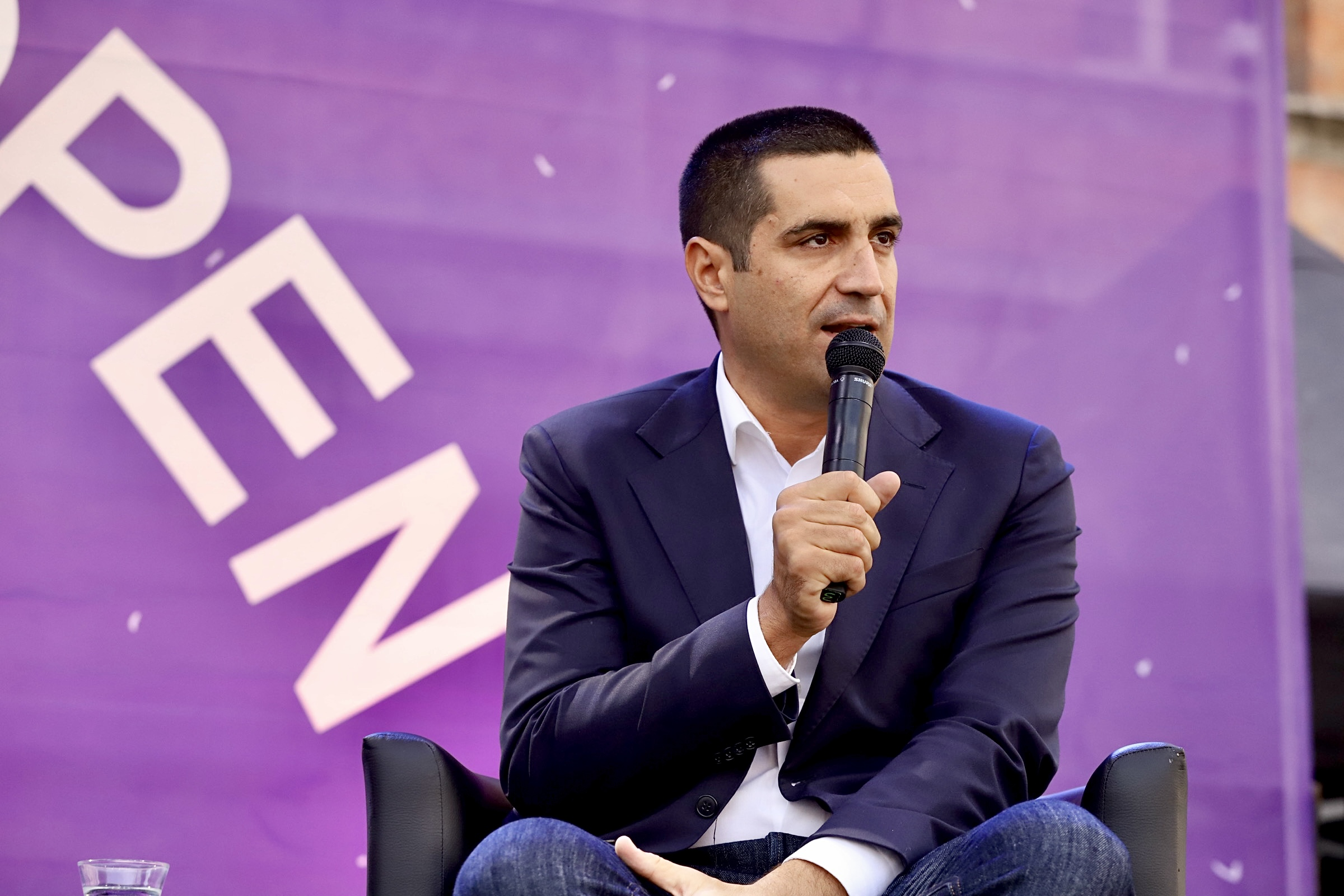
De Pascale during the 2024 electoral campaign

On 12 July 2024, ahead of the regional election in Emilia-Romagna, called following the election of President Stefano Bonaccini to the European Parliament, De Pascale announced his candidacy for the presidency of the region. He was unanimously selected by the regional leadership of the PD at a meeting held in Bologna.

His candidacy was supported by a centre-left coalition comprising the PD, M5S, Greens and Left Alliance, and a centrist and reformist list and a civic list. At the election, De Pascale was elected President of Emilia-Romagna with 56.77% of the vote, defeating the centre-right coalition candidate Elena Ugolini, who received 40.07%. On 11 December 2024, he appointed his regional executive, composed of six women and five men. He retained direct responsibility for soil and coastal protection, civil protection, hydrogeological risk mitigation, and post-flood reconstruction following the 2023 Emilia-Romagna floods.

During his tenure, the regional administration suspended institutional relations with Israel in protest against the bombings and military operations carried out by the Israeli armed forces in the Gaza Strip, which, according to regional authorities, had resulted in the deaths of tens of thousands of Palestinian civilians.

== Personal life ==
Since 2013, De Pascale has been married to Laura Casadio, daughter of former President of the Province of Ravenna Claudio Casadio. The couple have two children.

In January 2011, De Pascale was involved in a serious road accident caused by falling asleep at the wheel. He sustained two vertebral fractures, collapsed lungs, and an open fracture-dislocation of the ankle. He was placed in a medically induced coma for ten days and subsequently underwent several years of surgeries and rehabilitation before recovering.

== See also ==
- 2016 Italian local elections
- 2021 Italian local elections
- 2024 Emilia-Romagna regional election
- List of mayors of Ravenna

Political offices
Preceded by Stefano Bonaccini	President of Emilia-Romagna since 2024	Incumbent
Preceded by Fabrizio Matteucci	Mayor of Ravenna; 2016-2024	Succeeded by Alessandro Barattoni
Preceded by Claudio Casadio	President of the Province of Ravenna; 2016-2024	Succeeded by Valentina Palli
