= Vidmer Mercatali =

Italian politician (born 1949)

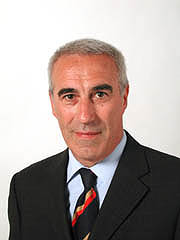
Vidmer Mercatali

Vidmer Mercatali (born 17 May 1949) is an Italian politician who served as a Senator (2006–2013) and Mayor of Ravenna for two terms (1997–2006).
