= Siege of Ravenna (1240) =

1240 imperial capture of Ravenna

- Part of the Guelph–Ghibelline conflict and the conflict between Frederick II and Pope Gregory IX
Date	August 1240
Location	Ravenna, Kingdom of Italy
Result	Imperial victory: Ravenna capitulates after four days; Papal faction expelled and leading opponents imprisoned

Belligerents
Holy Roman Empire: Imperial and Ghibelline contingents	Papal-aligned Ravenna: Guelph faction and civic militia

Commanders and leaders
Frederick II	Teodorico, Archbishop of Ravenna; Paolo Traversari †

Strength
5,000–8,000: Imperial cavalry, infantry and engineering contingents	1,000–2,000: Civic militia and papal-aligned forces

Casualties and losses
Few	Few hundred killed, wounded or captured

The Siege of Ravenna was a short military operation conducted by Frederick II in August 1240 during the renewed war between the emperor and Pope Gregory IX. Ravenna had joined the anti-imperial alignment in 1239 and formed part of the network of papal and Guelph positions threatening imperial communications between northern and central Italy. Frederick's army reached the city during his northward campaign following the fall of Ferrara. After overcoming the difficult waterways surrounding Ravenna and attacking its suburbs, the imperial forces compelled the city to capitulate after only four days. The victory restored an important political and symbolic centre to imperial obedience and opened the way for Frederick's subsequent operations against Faenza.

== Background ==
Ravenna had passed into the anti-imperial camp in July 1239, encouraged by Venetian influence and led politically by Archbishop Teodorico and the powerful Traversari family. Its importance was particularly symbolic: the former late Roman imperial capital possessed an archbishop whose traditional prestige extended across much of Romagna. The capture of nearby Ferrara by a papal-Guelph coalition in June 1240 further weakened Frederick's position in the region and helped prompt his movement northwards. Abulafia places Ravenna among the key objectives controlling the routes between northern Italy and the south.

== Siege ==
Frederick reached Ravenna in August. The city's surroundings, crossed by streams, marshes and artificial waterways, complicated a direct approach, but imperial engineers constructed crossings and diverted or bridged watercourses to create usable routes for the army. Imperial troops reached the suburbs and set parts of them on fire, increasing the pressure on the defenders. The sudden death of Paolo Traversari, one of the principal leaders of the anti-imperial faction, further weakened Ravenna's resistance. Morale collapsed quickly, and after only four days the city capitulated to Frederick.

== Aftermath ==
The surrender restored Ravenna to imperial control with comparatively little prolonged fighting. Archbishop Teodorico, members of the Traversari family and other leading opponents were sent as prisoners to the Kingdom of Sicily, while an imperial castle and garrison were established inside the city to secure its obedience. The speed of the operation contrasted sharply with the much more difficult siege that followed at Faenza. Frederick immediately turned against that city, whose alliance with Bologna threatened his rear and obstructed further operations in Romagna. Together with the later fall of Faenza, Ravenna's recovery helped reopen imperial communications through the region and partially reverse the political consequences of Ferrara's capture.

== Sources ==
- Abulafia, David (1988). Frederick II: A Medieval Emperor. London: Allen Lane. ISBN 9780713990041.
- Grillo, Paolo (2023). Federico II: La guerra, le città e l'Impero. Milan: Mondadori. ISBN 978-88-04-76912-5.
- Stürner, Wolfgang (2000). Friedrich II. Teil 2: Der Kaiser 1220–1250. Darmstadt: Primus Verlag. ISBN 978-3-534-12229-5.
