= Maremma Toscana =

Italian wine

Maremma toscana is a Denominazione di Origine Controllata (DOC) wine produced in the Italian region of Tuscany. The DOC guidelines permit a wide variety of grapes and styles.

== History ==
Until 2011, Maremma Toscana was recognized as an Indicazione geografica tipica (IGT).
