= Russi =

- Comune
- Città di Russi
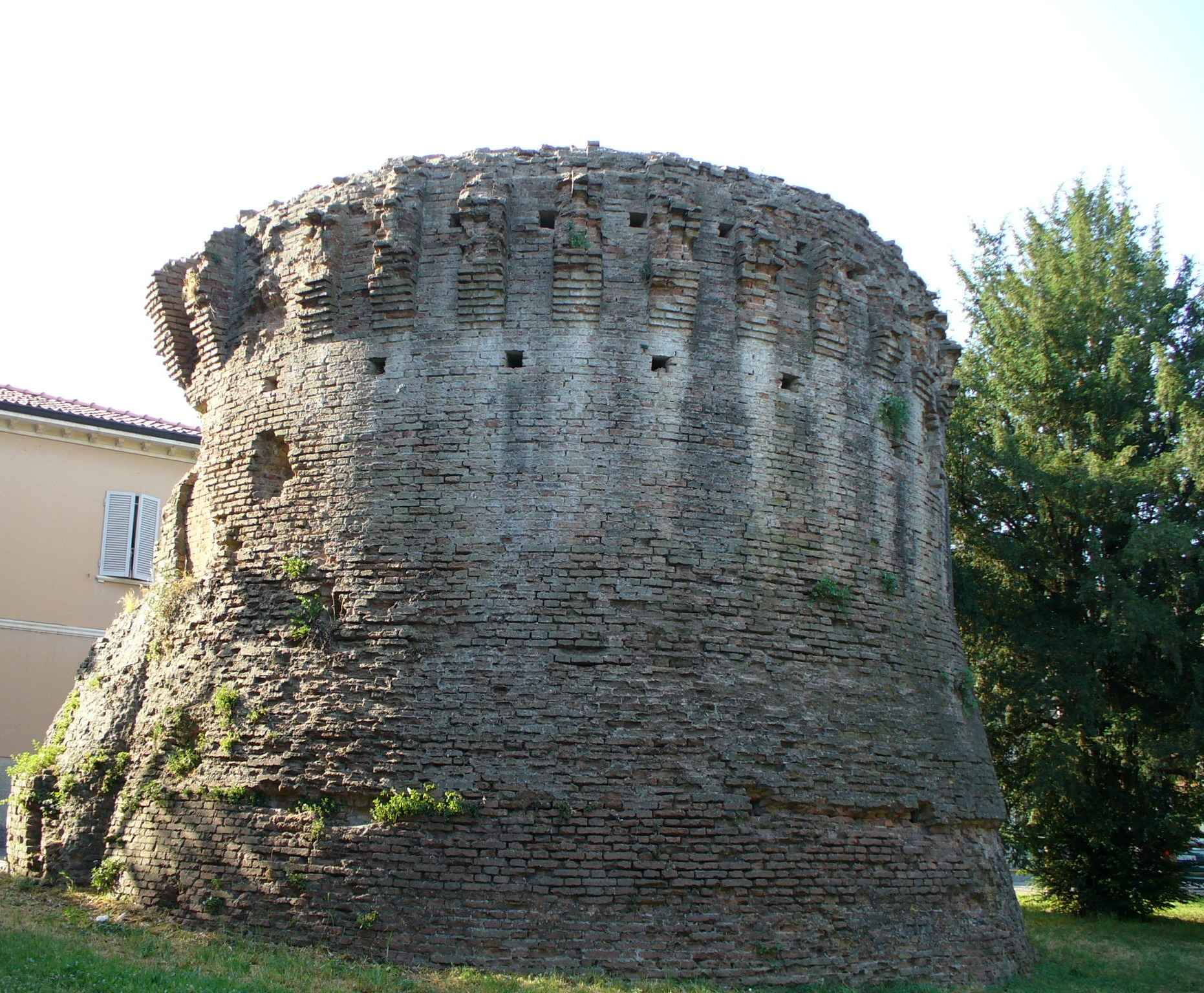
- Medieval fortifications

- Location within Italy Location within Emilia-Romagna
- Coordinates: 44°23′N 12°2′E
- Country: Italy
- Region: Emilia-Romagna
- Province: Ravenna (RA)
- Frazioni: Borgo Testi Rasponi, Borgo Violetta, Borgo Zampartino, Chiesuola, Cortina, Godo, Pezzolo, San Pancrazio

Government
  - Mayor: Valentina Palli

Area
  - Total: 46.1 km^{2} (17.8 sq mi)

Population (2008)
  - Total: 11,446
  - Density: 248/km^{2} (643/sq mi)
- Demonym: Russiani
- Time zone: UTC+1 (CET)
  - Summer (DST): UTC+2 (CEST)
- Postal code: 48026
- Dialing code: 0544
- Patron saint: St. Apollinaris
- Saint day: 23 July
- Website: Official website

Russi (Romagnol: Ròss) is a comune (municipality) in the Province of Ravenna in the Italian region Emilia-Romagna, located about 60 kilometres (37 mi) east of Bologna and about 14 kilometres (9 mi) southwest of Ravenna.
