= Ravenna Township =

Ravenna Township may refer to:

- Ravenna Township, Michigan
- Ravenna Township, Dakota County, Minnesota
- Ravenna Township, Portage County, Ohio
- Ravenna Township, Sanborn County, South Dakota, in Sanborn County, South Dakota
