= List of mayors of Ravenna =

Mayor of Ravenna
- Sindaco di Ravenna
- Incumbent; Alessandro Barattoni (PD) since 31 May 2025
- Appointer: Popular election
- Term length: 5 years, renewable once
- Formation: 1860
- Website: Official website

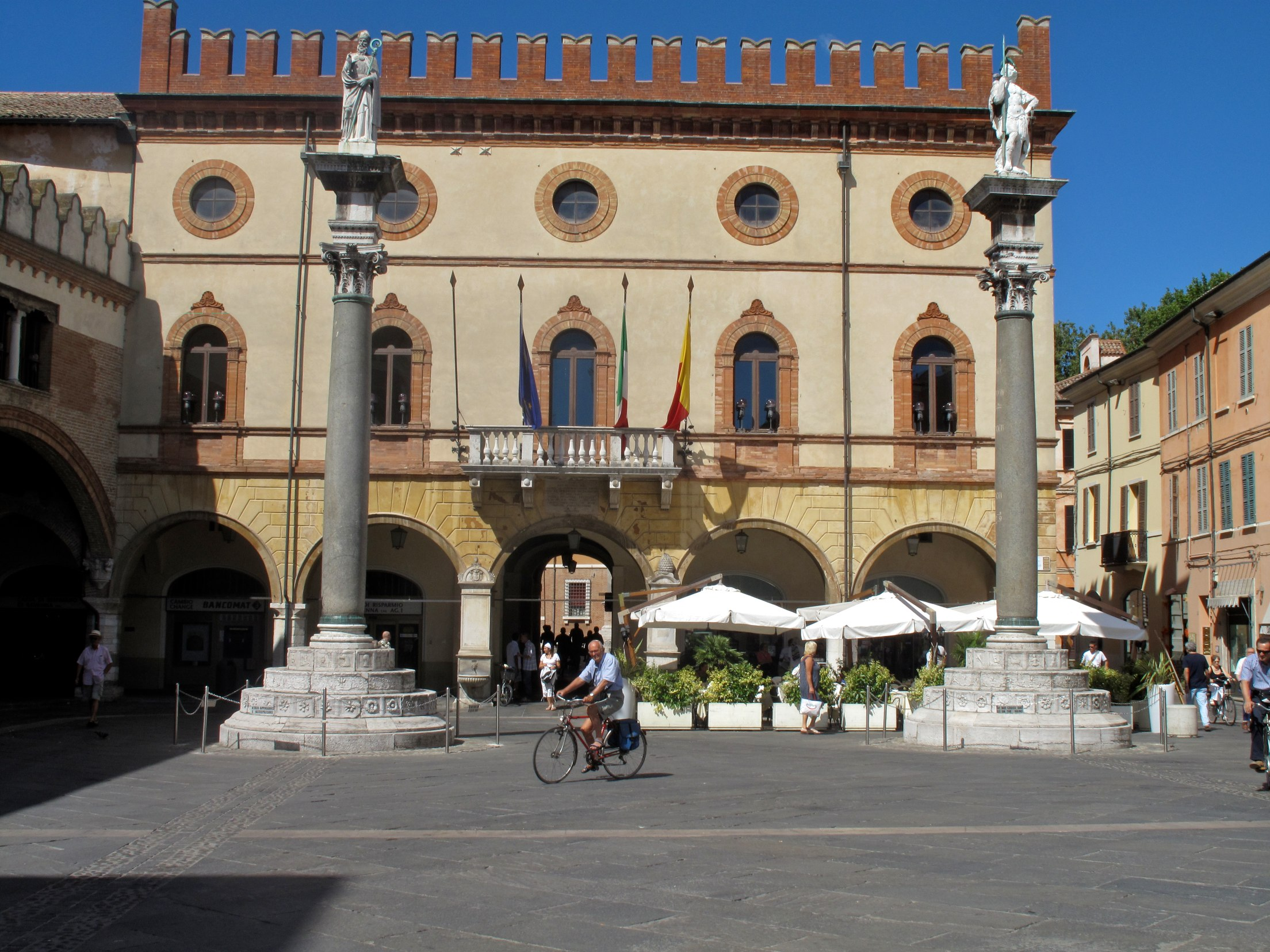
Ravenna's City Hall

The mayor of Ravenna is an elected politician who, along with the Ravenna's city council, is accountable for the strategic government of Ravenna in Emilia-Romagna, Italy.

== Overview ==
According to the Italian Constitution, the mayor of Ravenna is member of the city council.

The mayor is elected by the population of Ravenna, who also elect the members of the city council, controlling the mayor's policy guidelines and is able to enforce his resignation by a motion of no confidence. The mayor is entitled to appoint and release the members of his government.

Since 1993 the mayor is elected directly by Ravenna's electorate: in all mayoral elections in Italy in cities with a population higher than 15,000 the voters express a direct choice for the mayor or an indirect choice voting for the party of the candidate's coalition. If no candidate receives at least 50% of votes, the top two candidates go to a second round after two weeks. The election of the City Council is based on a direct choice for the candidate with a preference vote: the candidate with the majority of the preferences is elected. The number of the seats for each party is determined proportionally.

== Kingdom of Italy (1860–1946) ==
	Mayor	Term start	Term end	Party
Mayors appointed by the King (1860-1889)
1	Vincenzo Cavalli	1860	1863	Right
2	Gioacchino Rasponi	1863	1865	Left
3	Ignazio Guiccioli	1865	1869	Right
4	Cosimo Fabbri	1869	1871	Left
(2)	Gioacchino Rasponi	1871	1873	Left
5	Silvio Guerrini	1873	1876	Left
6	Ugo Lovatelli Dal Corno	1876	1883	Right
7	Pietro Gamba	1883	1886	Right
8	Ugo Burnazzi	1886	1889	Left
Mayors elected by the City Council (1889-1926)
9	Tullio Corradini Ginanni	1889	1892	Right
10	Pio Poletti	1892	1902	Left
11	Luigi Cilla	1902	1906	PSI
12	Ferdinando Gallina	1906	1910	PRI
13	Chiarissimo Calderoni	1910	1914	PRI
13	Fortunato Buzzi	1914	1923	PRI
14	Celso Calvetti	1923	1926	PNF
Fascist Podestà (1926-1944)
1	Celso Calvetti	1926	1931	PNF
2	Andrea Cagnoni	1931	1937	PNF
3	Giovanni Cottignola	1937	1944	PNF
Liberation (1944-1946)
15	Riccardo Campagnoni	1944	1946	PRI

== Republic of Italy (since 1946) ==
=== City Council election (1946–1993) ===
From 1946 to 1993, the mayor of Ravenna was elected by the city council.

	Mayor	Term start	Term end	Party	Coalition	Election
1	Gino Gatta	1946	1951	PCI	PCI • PSIUP	1946
2	Celso Cicognani	1951	1956	PRI	PRI • DC	1951
2	Celso Cicognani	1956	1961	PRI	PRI • DC	1956
Special Prefectural Commissioner tenure (1961–1963)						1960
Special Prefectural Commissioner tenure (1961–1963)						1961
3	Bruno Benelli	1963	1967	PRI	PRI • DC • PSDI	1962
Special Prefectural Commissioner tenure (1967–1969)						1966
4	Secondo Bini	1969	1969	PRI	PRI • DC	1968
5	Aristide Canosani	1969	1973	PSI	PCI • PSI	1968
5	Aristide Canosani	1973	1976	PSI	PCI • PSI	1973
6	Vincenzo Randi	1976	1977	PSI	PCI • PSI	1973
(5)	Aristide Canosani	1977	1980	PSI	PCI • PSI	1973
7	Giordano Angelini	1980	1983	PCI	PCI • PSI	1979
7	Giordano Angelini	1983	1987	PCI	PCI • PSI • PRI	1983
8	Mauro Dragoni	1987	1988	PCI	PCI • PSI • PRI	1983
8	Mauro Dragoni	1988	1992	PCI	PCI • PSI • PRI	1988
9	Giovanni Miserocchi	1992	1993	PDS	PCI • PSI • PRI	1988

=== Direct election (since 1993) ===
Since 1993, under provisions of new local administration law, the Mayor of Ravenna is chosen by direct election, originally every four, and since 2001 every five years.

	Mayor	Took office	Left office	Party	Coalition	Election
10	Pier Paolo D'Attorre (1951–1997)	21 June 1993	27 April 1997 (Note: Died on his last day in office.)	PDS	PDS	1993
11	Vidmer Mercatali (b. 1949)	28 April 1997	14 May 2001	PDS; DS	The Olive Tree (PDS-PPI-PRI-PRC)	1997
11	Vidmer Mercatali (b. 1949)	14 May 2001	30 May 2006	PDS; DS	The Olive Tree (DS-DL-PRI-PRC)	2001
12	Fabrizio Matteucci (1957–2020)	30 May 2006	16 May 2011	DS; PD	The Olive Tree (DS-DL-PRI-PRC)	2006
12	Fabrizio Matteucci (1957–2020)	16 May 2011	21 June 2016	DS; PD	PD • PRI • IdV • SEL • FdS	2011
13	Michele De Pascale (b. 1985)	21 June 2016	9 October 2021	PD	PD • PRI and leftist lists	2016
13	Michele De Pascale (b. 1985)	9 October 2021 (Note: Election originally scheduled for June 2021 then postponed due to the coronavirus pandemic.)	13 December 2024 (Note: Resigned after being elected President of Emilia-Romagna. The deputy mayor Fabio Sbaraglia (PD) held the office till a new municipal election was held.)	PD	PD • PRI • M5S and leftist lists	2021
14	Alessandro Barattoni (b. 1982)	31 May 2025	Incumbent	PD	PD • PRI • AVS • M5S	2025

== See also ==
- Timeline of Ravenna
