= Alessandro Barattoni =

Mayor of Ravenna, Italy

Mayor of Ravenna
- Incumbent
- Assumed office 31 May 2025
- Preceded by: Michele De Pascale

Personal details
- Born: 6 November 1982 (age 43) Faenza, Italy
- Party: Democratic Party
- Education: University of Bologna
- Profession: Employee

Alessandro Barattoni (born 6 November 1982) is an Italian politician, mayor of Ravenna since 2025.

== Biography ==
Graduated in political science at the University of Bologna in the "Institutions, economics and policies of the European Union" course, Barattoni is an employee of Federcoop Romagna, where he has dealt mainly with logistics and real estate management issues.

A member of the Democratic Party since its foundation, he was elected for the first time as a municipal councilor in Ravenna in 2011, in support of the mayor Fabrizio Matteucci, and was then reconfirmed five years later, this time in support of Michele De Pascale.

In 2017, Barattoni was elected provincial secretary of the Democratic Party.

On the occasion of the 2025 snap local elections, brought forward by two years following the election of Mayor De Pascale as President of Emilia-Romagna, Barattoni becomes the official candidate of the centre-left coalition for the office of mayor of Ravenna, supported by the Democratic Party, the Five Star Movement, the Greens and Left Alliance, the Italian Republican Party and two civic lists, being elected in the first round with 58.15% of the votes.

== See also ==
- 2025 Italian local elections
- List of mayors of Ravenna

Political offices
Preceded by Michele De Pascale	Mayor of Ravenna since 2025	Incumbent
