= Massa Lombarda =

- Comune
- Comune di Massa Lombarda
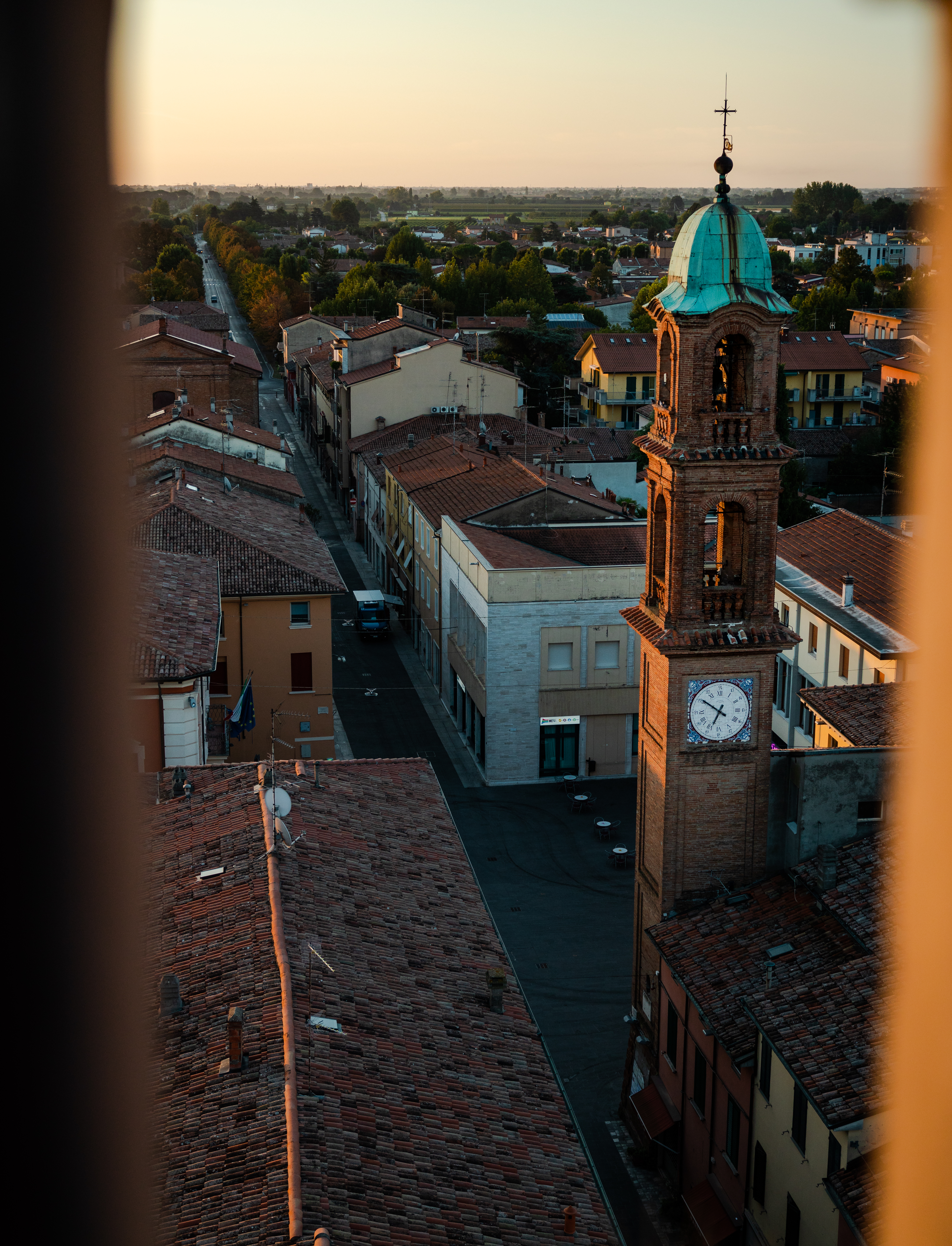

- Coat of arms

- Location within Italy Location within Emilia-Romagna
- Coordinates: 44°27′N 11°49′E
- Country: Italy
- Region: Emilia-Romagna
- Province: Ravenna (RA)
- Frazioni: Fruges, La Zeppa, Villa Serraglio

Government
  - Mayor: Daniele Bassi

Area
  - Total: 37.2 km^{2} (14.4 sq mi)
- Elevation: 13 m (43 ft)

Population (31 October 2017)
  - Total: 10,604
  - Density: 285/km^{2} (738/sq mi)
- Demonym: Massesi
- Time zone: UTC+1 (CET)
  - Summer (DST): UTC+2 (CEST)
- Postal code: 48024
- Dialing code: 0545
- Patron saint: St. Paul
- Saint day: 25 January
- Website: Official website

Massa Lombarda (Romagnol: La Mása) is a comune (municipality) in the Province of Ravenna in the Italian region Emilia-Romagna, located about 40 kilometres (25 mi) east of Bologna and about 30 kilometres (19 mi) west of Ravenna.

== Notable people ==
- Angiolo Torchi (1856-1915), painter

== Twin towns ==
Massa Lombarda is twinned with:

- Poreč, Croatia, since 1981
