= Battle of Ravenna (475) =

Date	28 August 475
Location	Near Ravenna, Italy
Result	Victory to Orestes

Belligerents
Supporters of Orestes	Supporters of Julius Nepos

Commanders and leaders
Orestes	Julius Nepos

Strength
24,000	7,000

Casualties and losses
Unknown	Unknown

The Battle of Ravenna was fought between supporters of Orestes and supporters of Julius Nepos for control of the Western Roman Empire. In prelude to the battle, Orestes had been ordered to raise a large army to confront tribal rulers in Gaul. Instead he led his force against emperor Julius Nepos in the capital Ravenna. Nepos was defeated and deposed, but managed to flee to Dalmatia. Orestes in turn enthroned his son Romulus Augustulus as Roman emperor. He was in turn overthrown by Odoacer in September 476 following the Roman defeat at Pavia.

== Sources ==
- Jaques, Tony (2007). Dictionary of Battles and Sieges: P-Z. Greenwood Publishing Group. ISBN 978-0313335396.
