= Province of Ravenna =

Province of Italy

Coordinates: 44°25′4″N 12°11′58″E

Province of Ravenna Provincia di Ravenna (Italian) Pruvènza ed Ravèna (Romagnol)
- Province
- Flag Coat of arms

- Location of the province of Ravenna in Italy
- Country: Italy
- Region: Emilia-Romagna
- Capital(s): Ravenna
- Municipalities: 18

Government
  - President: Valentina Palli

Area
  - Total: 1,859.44 km^{2} (717.93 sq mi)

Population (2026)
  - Total: 387,743
  - Density: 208.527/km^{2} (540.082/sq mi)

GDP
  - Total: €12.058 billion (2015)
  - Per capita: €30,779 (2015)
- Time zone: UTC+1 (CET)
  - Summer (DST): UTC+2 (CEST)
- Postal code: 48010-48015, 48017, 48018, 48020, 48022, 48024-48027, 48100
- Telephone prefix: 0544, 0545, 0546
- Vehicle registration: RA
- ISTAT code: 039

The province of Ravenna (Italian: provincia di Ravenna; Romagnol: pruvènza ed Ravèna) is a province in the region of Emilia-Romagna in Italy. Its capital is the city of Ravenna. It has a population of 387,743 in an area of 1,859.44 square kilometres (717.93 sq mi) across its 18 municipalities.

Its provincial president is Valentina Palli.

== History ==
Ravenna was first inhabited by Italic tribes from northern regions, and was conquered in 191 BCE by the Roman Republic. A port was constructed near Classe, and the Adriatic fleet was based in Ravenna. In 402 CE, Ravenna became the capital of the Western Roman Empire, which endured until the collapse of the empire and the fall of Rome in 476. Following this, the Barbarian Kings Odoacer and then Theodoric controlled Ravenna until it was conquered by the Byzantine Empire in 540; the Byzantines announced it to be their Exarchate.

It continued to be under Byzantine rule until it was invaded by the Lombards in 751, and it was then annexed by King of the Franks Pippin the Younger. It was placed under papal rule by Pippin the Younger in 756 or 757. Ravenna was subsequently ruled by the Holy See until it was given independence in the 12th century. The papacy gained control again in 1278 and was led by papal vicars until it was invaded by Venice in 1441. The War of the League of Cambrai took place near Ravenna in 1512, in which the papal forces were defeated, but the French forces were almost entirely killed and were driven from Italy. It remained under the rule of the Holy See until it became part of the Kingdom of Italy.

In 1921, uprisings in Ravenna triggered a rapid advance of the Fascist movement in the region. Buildings belonging to the Republicans and socialists were seized or burnt down by Italo Balbo, and on July 29, he and his men moved throughout the provinces of Ravenna and Forli, burning every socialist organisation headquarters in a night of terror which was later called the "column of fire". This was a pivotal moment in the advance of Fascism in northern Italy.

== Geography ==
The province of Ravenna is one of nine provinces in the region of Emilia-Romagna in the northeast of Italy. It is on the east of the region and abuts onto the Adriatic Sea. The province of Ferrara lies immediately to the north and the Metropolitan City of Bologna is to the west. The Metropolitan City of Florence in the region of Tuscany lies to the southwest, and the province of Forlì-Cesena to the south. The provincial capital is the city of Ravenna, which is situated a few miles inland and is connected to the Adriatic Sea by the Candiano Canal.

=== Municipalities ===
The province has 18 municipalities:

- Alfonsine
- Bagnacavallo
- Bagnara di Romagna
- Brisighella
- Casola Valsenio
- Castel Bolognese
- Cervia
- Conselice
- Cotignola
- Faenza
- Fusignano
- Lugo
- Massa Lombarda
- Ravenna
- Riolo Terme
- Russi
- Sant'Agata sul Santerno
- Solarolo

== Demographics ==
Historical population
Year	Pop.	±%
1861	201,793	—
1871	216,843	+7.5%
1881	219,208	+1.1%
1901	234,656	+7.0%
1911	247,602	+5.5%
1921	257,745	+4.1%
1931	272,898	+5.9%
1936	279,127	+2.3%
1951	294,719	+5.6%
1961	329,559	+11.8%
1971	351,876	+6.8%
1981	358,654	+1.9%
1991	350,454	−2.3%
2001	347,847	−0.7%
2011	384,761	+10.6%
2021	385,631	+0.2%
Source: ISTAT

As of 2026, the population is 387,743, of which 49.3% are male, and 50.7% are female. Minors make up 13.9% of the population, and seniors make up 26.6%.

=== Immigration ===
As of 2025, immigrants make up 15.7% of the population. The 5 largest foreign countries of birth are Albania, Romania, Morocco, Senegal, and Moldova.

== Transport ==
=== Railways ===
The province of Ravenna is served by the Bologna-Ancona, Russi-Faenza, Faenza-Florence, Faenza-Lavezzola, and Castel Bolognese-Ravenna railway lines. Services are operated by Trenitalia and its subsidiary Trenitalia TPER.

The following railway stations can be found:

- Alfonsine
- Bagnacavallo
- Barbiano di Cotignola
- Brisighella
- Castel Bolognese-Riolo Terme
- Cervia-Milano Marittima
- Classe
- Cotignola
- Faenza
- Fognano
- Granarolo Faentino
- Godo
- Lavezzola
- Lido di Classe-Lido di Savio
- Lugo
- Massalombarda
- Mezzano
- Ravenna
- Russi
- San Cassiano
- San Martino in Gattara
- San Patrizio
- Sant'Agata sul Santerno
- Solarolo
- Strada Casale
- Voltana

=== Bus services ===
The main bus operators in the province are START Romagna and CO.ER.BUS, and they operate the main urban, suburban and interurban services in the area and neighbouring provinces.

TPER also operate a few bus services between Lugo, Sant'Agata sul Santerno, Massa Lombarda, Bologna and Imola, with other services bound for the province of Ferrara. However, its route 296 (Lugo–Bagnacavallo–Ravenna–Lido Adriano) is the only TPER route entirely in the province of Ravenna.

=== Airports ===
The province of Ravenna has no operating international airport, but only a small aerodrome in Ravenna for private flights and flying schools.

The closest international airports are Bologna Airport and Rimini Airport.
