= Quadi =

Roman-era Germanic kingdom near present-day Bratislava

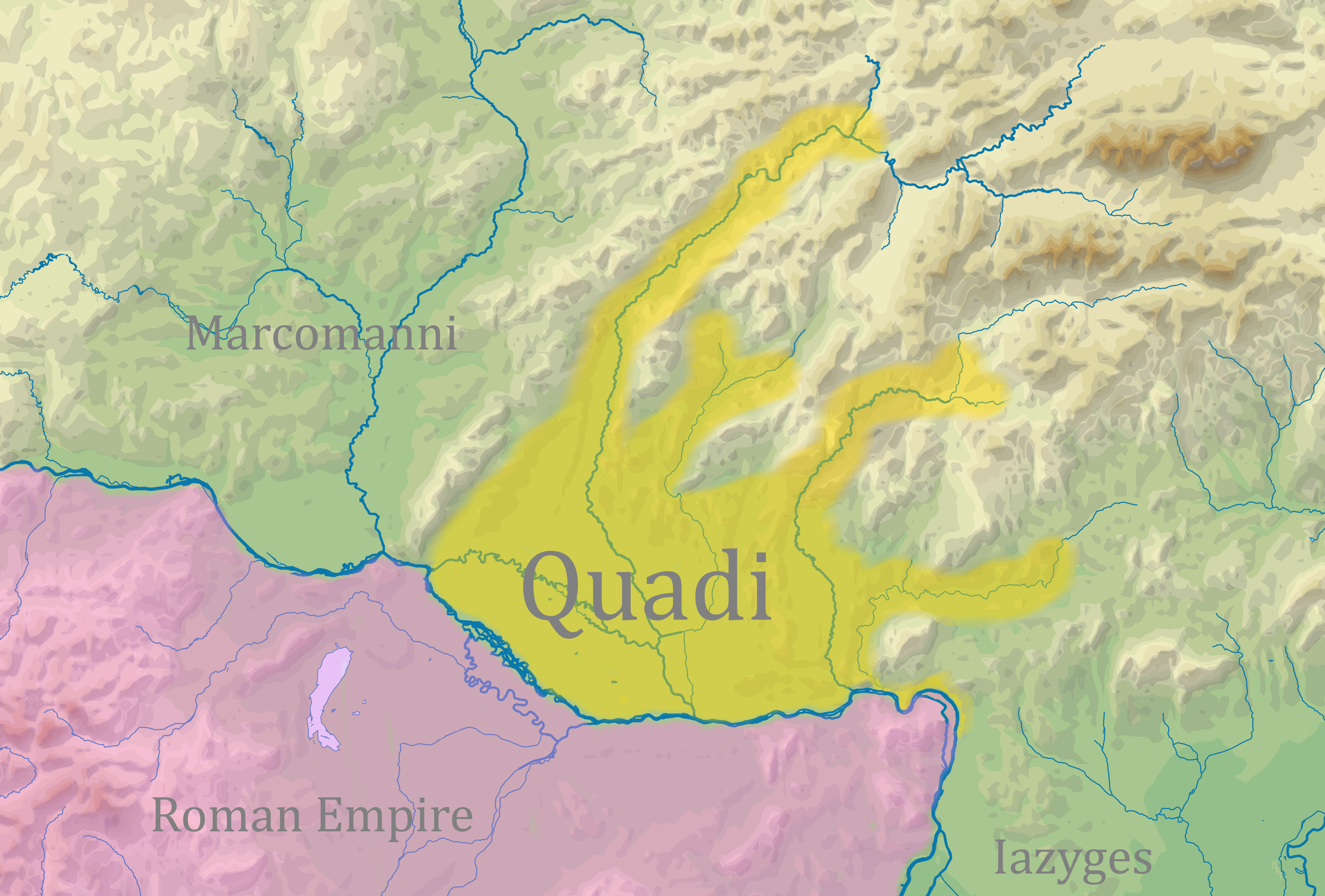
Approximate settlement area of the Quadi people in the late Roman era (3rd-4th centuries)

The Quadi were a Germanic people during the Roman era, who were prominent in Greek and Roman records from about 20 AD to about 400 AD. By about 20 AD they had a kingdom centred in the area of present-day western Slovakia, north of the Roman border on the Danube river. After probably first settling near the Morava river the Quadi expanded their control eastwards over time until they also stretched into present day Hungary. This was part of the bigger region which had been partly vacated a generation earlier by the Celtic Boii, and their opponents the Dacians. The Quadi were the easternmost of a series of four related Suebian kingdoms that established themselves near the river frontier after 9 BC, during a period of major Roman invasions into both western Germania to the northwest of it, and Pannonia to the south of it. The other three were the Hermunduri, Naristi (also known as Varisti), and the Quadi's powerful western neighbours the Marcomanni. Despite frequent difficulties with the Romans, the Quadi survived to become an important cultural bridge between the peoples of Germania to the north, the Roman Empire to the south, and the Sarmatian peoples, most notably the Iazyges, who settled in the same period on the great plain between the Danube and the Tisza rivers.

The Marcomannic Wars, during the reign of the emperor Marcus Aurelius and his co-emperors, involved several rounds of particularly destructive conflict against the Quadi and their neighbours, who at one point even invaded Italy itself. By 180 AD when the emperor died on campaign in this region, there were new peace agreements between Rome and the Quadi, but these did not resolve the longer term problems which the region continued to face. Populations from more distant regions periodically disrupted the area, increasing tensions with Rome. Small scale raiding from the neighbouring Sarmatian plain into Roman Pannonia continued, and this played a role in triggering more conflicts between the Quadi and Romans in the third and fourth centuries. However, while the original Marcomanni settlements in the northern Bohemian forest subsequently shrank and became less important, the Quadi thrived near the Danube, and became more culturally integrated with both their Roman and Sarmatian neighbours.

After about 380 AD their Middle Danubian region experienced an influx of armed peoples from more distant parts of eastern Europe, most notably the Huns, Alans and Goths. In 395 AD, Saint Jerome listed the Quadi and their traditional neighbours the Sarmatians, Marcomanni, and Vandals, as peoples who had recently been ransacking the nearby Roman provinces together with these newcomers. In 409 he placed the Quadi, Vandals, Sarmatians, Heruli, and even inhabitants of Roman Pannonia, in another list of peoples from the Danubian region who had recently moved west, and occupied parts of Gaul. These were the last clear contemporary records of the Quadi. Given their presence in Gaul in 409 AD the Quadi are considered likely to have been prominent among the Suevi who moved further west into Iberia by 409 AD and founded the Kingdom of the Suebi in Gallaecia, in present day northern Spain and Portugal. This Gallaecian kingdom lasted for more than a century, until it was defeated by the Visigoths, and integrated into their kingdom in 585.

Meanwhile, until he died in 453, the empire of Attila controlled the Middle Danubian region, and a much later source claimed that the Quadi fought under Attila at the Battle of the Catalaunian Plains in 451 AD. After Attila's death smaller kingdoms were founded in or near the old Marcomanni and Quadi kingdoms, by the "Danube Suevi" (German: Donausueben), as well as the Rugii, Heruli and Sciri. These Danube Suevi are likely to have included descendants of the Quadi, Marcomanni and other Suebian peoples of the region. Their short-lived independent kingdom was defeated by Ostrogoths at the Battle of Bolia in 469. Some of them apparently moved westwards under their king Hunimund, into present-day western Austria and southern Germany, where they became allies of the Alemanni. Other Quadi are presumed to have remained in the Middle Danube region and adapted to the subsequent waves of conquerors, either among the remaining settled communities, or among the more mobile groups which were prominent during this "migration period". Like their neighbours the Heruli, Rugii and Sciri, many probably became followers of the large forces which successfully invaded Italy from the Middle Danube under Odoacer (476 AD), Theoderic the Great (493 AD), and finally the Suebian Langobards (starting in 568 AD), who are believed to have integrated many of their fellow Suebi into their ranks before moving into Italy.

== Name ==
According to the Germanische Altertumskunde Online, the etymologies proposed for the ethnonym are all fraught with difficulties:

- Since Jacob Grimm (d. 1863), it has often been assumed that this ethnonym is related to the Dutch adjective kwaad, which means "angry, bad, evil, wrong, poor quality" - versions of which are also found in medieval German and English. However, this would be a surprising choice of name, because it has such a negative meaning. It could therefore perhaps have started as a name given by their enemies, and it might have continued as a name intended to evoke fear.
- The name has also often been associated with Germanic verbs such as English "quoth", originally the past tense of medieval "quethe", which meant "say" or "declare" (preserved in the modern word "bequeath"). However, the precise meaning of this word as an ethnonym is unclear in this case.
- Wolfgang Krause proposed that the ethnonym might derive from a Germanic word hwatjan, meaning "to incite". However, the form of the ethnonym as it appears in ancient sources does not show the expected Germanic First Sound Shift.

== First reports and location ==
The Quadi start to appear in contemporary works only after their neighbours the Marcomanni settled in central Bohemia. The Marcomanni moved after their defeat during the Germania campaign of the elder Drusus in about 9 BC. They somehow acquired a new king Maroboduus, who had been brought up in Rome. Strabo, writing about 23 AD, appears to have written the earliest surviving mention of the Quadi, although aspects of the text are somewhat doubtful. He described a mountain range running parallel to the Danube but north of it, like a smaller version of the Alps which run south of it. Within it was the Hercynian Forest, and within this forest were tribes of Suebi including "the tribes of the Coldui [καθάπερ τὰ τῶν κολδούων], in whose territory lies Buiaimon [Βουίαιμον, the original "Bohemia"], the royal seat of Maroboduus". King Maroboduus, he wrote, had led several peoples into this forested region, including his own people the Marcomanni. He became the ruler of the Suevi peoples in this forested region, and also over other Suevi living outside it. Not only is Strabo's spelling of Quadi with an "L" unexpected when compared to later references, but also the implication that Maroboduus lived within Quadi territory. Errors are therefore suspected in the surviving text.

It is often presumed that the Quadi settled in Moravia around the same time that the Marcomanni settled in neighbouring Bohemia. It is also possible that the name "Quadi" was new, but that the same group had previously been referred to as "Suebi" in Roman accounts. The Romans defeated a group called the Suebi after they defeated the Marcomanni in 9 BC, and some scholars have speculated that these were the Quadi.

Another possibility is that the Quadi moved into the Bohemian area before the Marcomanni. This idea is supported by the archaeological evidence that Elbe Germanic peoples had been living in the region already before the Marcomanni defeat. The archaeological evidence left by the Quadi and Marcomanni is similar, making it difficult to define the borders between them, but it confirms that both shared much of their material culture with the Elbe Germani to their north, living near the central Elbe river and the Saale. The archaeological material culture which unites these groups, and distinguishes them from the previous Celtic inhabitants, is referred to as the "Grossromstedt horizon". It was influenced not only by the older Jastorf culture of the Elbe region, but also by the Przeworsk culture from further east, in present day Poland. The variant which developed in the old Boii lands is called the Plaňany-Group, and also shows the residual influence of their older Celtic La Tène culture of the Boii, which had itself already come under Przeworsk influence in the generations before the Germanic influx.

Whatever their origin, the evidence indicates that the Quadi initially lived near the Morava river, in southwestern Slovakia, southern Moravia, and north-eastern Lower Austria. However, their population, perhaps divided into two distinct states, later came to be more concentrated to the east of the Little Carpathians, in what is now Slovakia, and they eventually extended as far as Vác in present-day Hungary. At its height, their kingdom also possibly stretched west into present-day Bohemia. Over time the eastern Quadi became an important cultural bridge between Romans, Sarmatians and the more distant peoples to the north and east.

A contemporary of Strabo, Velleius Paterculus, did not mention the Quadi by name but described "Boiohaemum", where Maroboduus and the Marcomanni lived, as "plains surrounded by the Hercynian forest", and he said this was the only part of Germania which the Romans did not control in the period before the Roman defeat at the Battle of the Teutoburg Forest in 9 AD. Velleius also remarked that Maroboduus subjugated all his neighbours either by war or treaty. Hofeneder notes that many modern scholars interpret this to mean that the Quadi were also under his overlordship. Although there is no consensus about this, it is in any case clear that the two peoples were always closely connected during the many centuries in which they appear in records.

Velleius said that Maroboduus drilled his Bohemian soldiers to almost Roman standards, and that although his policy was to avoid conflict with Rome, the Romans came to be concerned that he could invade Italy. "Races and individuals who revolted from [the Romans] found in him a refuge." From a Roman point of view he noted that the closest point of access to Bohemia was via Carnuntum. This was between present-day Vienna and Bratislava, and near the Quadi territory where the Morava river enters the Danube.

The Quadi leader at the time when Maroboduus moved to Bohemia was apparently named Tudrus. He is mentioned only by Tacitus, who is also the first author to clearly mention the Quadi in ancient records. Although archaeological evidence indicates that the Marcomanni and Quadi entered the area after the old Boii population was much reduced already, Tacitus claimed that they drove the Boii out and won their country by valour. He also remarked that their kings were still from the same old family (or families):

The Marcomanni and Quadi have, up to our time, been ruled by kings of their own nation, descended from the noble stock of Maroboduus and Tudrus. They now submit even to foreigners; but the strength and power of the monarch depend on Roman influence. He is occasionally supported by our arms, more frequently by our money, and his authority is none the less.

To the east of the Quadi, Strabo mentioned that the Suevian neighbours of Maroboduus bordered upon the "Getae", which in this case refers to the Dacians. Later, Pliny the Elder mentioned that the Dacians had been pushed east to the Tisza, into the mountainous country (later referred to as Dacia) by the Sarmatian Iazyges. Pliny expressed doubt about whether the boundary between the Iazyges on the one hand, and the Suevi and the kingdom of Vannius on the other, was the Morava river or else the "Duria", which is a river that is no longer clearly identifiable. The 2nd-century Greek geographer Ptolemy similarly placed the Quadi on the edge of Germania, defining the "Sarmatian mountains" (Σαρματικὰ ὄρη) as the border, which he understood to run in a north-easterly direction from the sharp bend in the Danube to the "head of the Vistula" (κεφαλῆς τοῦ Οὐιστούλα), though present day Slovakia.

Ptolemy lists several neighbours of the Quadi living along this border of Germania. Between the Elbe and the head of the Vistula, but south of the Asciburgius mountains, lived the Corconti and the Buri, south of these were the Sidones, then the Cogni (perhaps the Cotini), and then the Visburgii, and south of this group was the Hercynian valley. South of this forested valley were the Quadi, and south of them were iron mines and the Luna Forest. Somewhat differently, Tacitus named four peoples living the north of the Marcomanni and Quadi, the Marsigni, Cotini (or "Gotini"), Osi, and Buri, dwelling in a range of mountains running from west to east through "Suevia", separating them from a large group of Germanic peoples named the Lugii. According to him the Osi and Cotini did not speak Germanic languages and worked the mines, paying the Quadi and Sarmatians tribute.

== First century AD ==
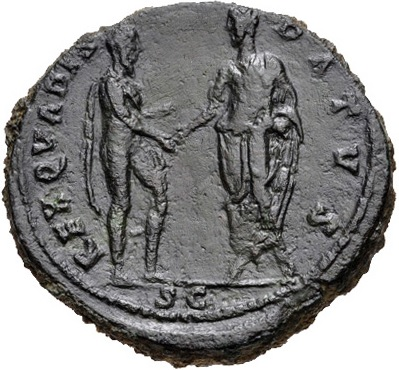
A sesterce of Antoninus Pius, 143 AD which says REX QUADIS DATUS (King given to Quadi)

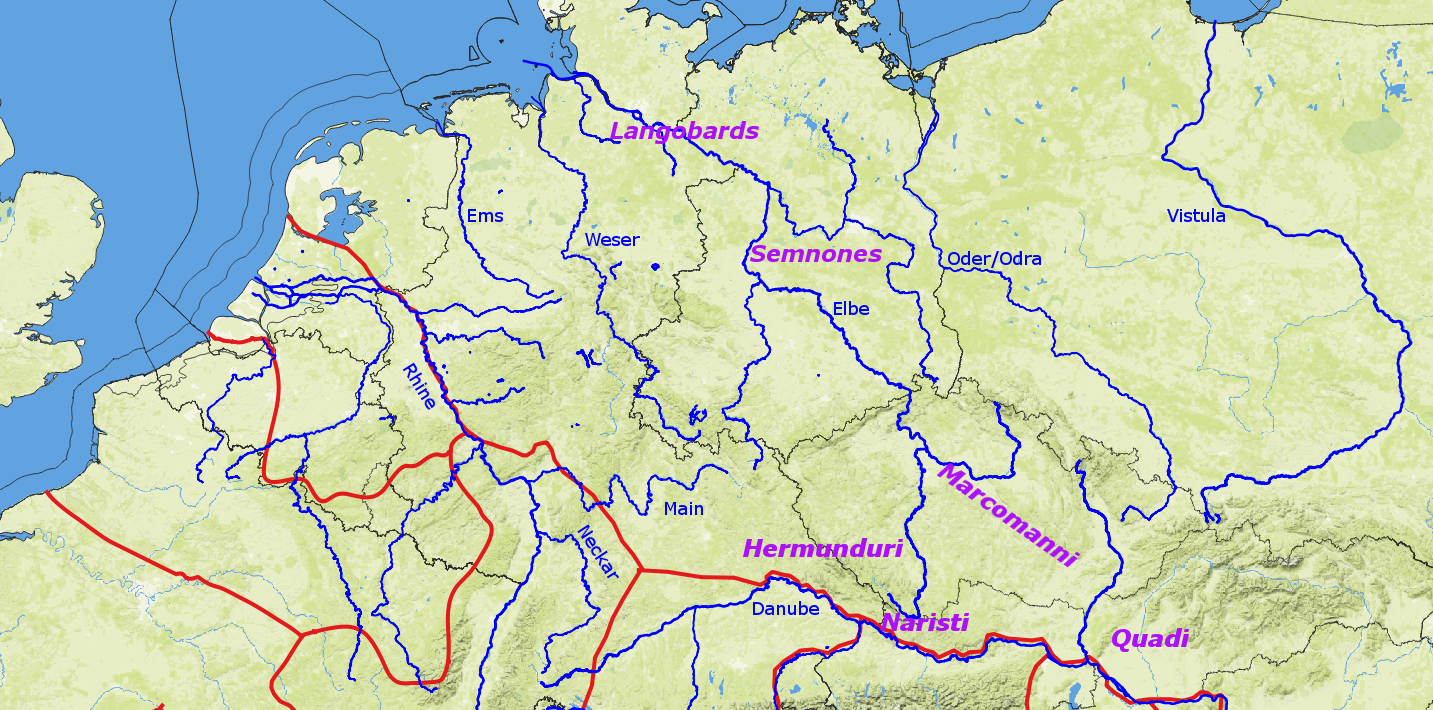
Approximate positions of some major Suebi peoples in the early 2nd century, in purple

In The Annals, Tacitus recounts that Maroboduus was deposed by an exiled noble named Catualda around 18 AD. Catualda was in turn defeated by the Hermunduri king, Vibilius.The subjects of both Maroboduus and Catualda were moved by the Romans to an area near the Danube, between the Morava and "Cusus" rivers, and a Quadian named Vannius was made king of them. In a later passage he indicates that Drusus Caesar had made "king of the Suevi". Scholars have proposed that the Romans were deliberately trying to create a buffer state with this settlement, but there is no consensus about this. The area where Vannius ruled over the Marcomanni exiles is generally considered to have been a distinct state to the Quadi kingdom itself. The Cusus river has not been identified with certainty. However, Slovak archaeological research locates the core area of the Vannius kingdom in the fertile southwestern Slovak lowlands around Trnava, east of the Little Carpathians. The swampy zone between the Little Carpathians and Danube provided an obstacle for possible attacks from non-Roman Pannonia.

Geographically, Pliny the Elder saw the Quadi area as the edge of Germania, with the Iazyges sitting outside of it, and the kingdom of Vannius within it. Consistent with this, in the second century Ptolemy (2.11.11) mentioned a "great nation" of "Baimi" (Βαῖμοι) between the Quadi and the Danube, and this likely to represent the kingdom of former Bohemians that Vannius once ruled. According to Ptolemy, next along the river were the Rakatri, and then the Rakatai who live near the "kampoi" (πρὸς τοῖς Κάμποις), which could mean "the plains" but may have referred to the bend in the Danube, a people named the Kampi, or the river Kamp near Vienna. West of the Hercynian forest was the Gambreta forest, and south of this, west of the Quadi, were the Marcomanni, and south of them, west of the Baemi, were a people called the Sudini, and south these on the Danube were the Adrabaecampi, which might not be a tribal name, and is in any case probably related to the word "Kampi" used in relation to the Rakatai.

Vannius personally benefitted from the new situation and became very wealthy and unpopular. He was himself eventually also deposed by Vibilius and the Hermunduri, together with the neighbouring Lugii, in 50/51 AD. Vannius's soldiers during this conflict are described here as infantry, but he also called for cavalry from his Sarmatian allies, the Iazyges. This was coordinated with the sons of his sister, Vangio and Sido, who then divided his realm between themselves as loyal Roman client kings. Vannius was defeated and fled with his followers across the Danube, where they were assigned land in Roman Pannonia. This settlement is convincingly associated with Germanic finds from the 1st century AD in Burgenland, west of Lake Neusiedl, within Roman Pannonia. Quadi soldiers subsequently participated second battle of Bedriacum under Sido and Italicus, perhaps the son of Vangio, in 69 AD at Cremona in Italy. An influx of North Italian green-glazed ceramics into southwestern Slovakia might be a result of the troops in Italy.

Tacitus reported in the late first century that the Osi, who spoke a language similar to the Pannonian Aravisci who lived near present day Budapest, and the Cotini, a Celtic-speaking people, mined iron in the mountainous regions north of the Quadi, in present day Slovakia, and paid tribute to the Quadi and their Sarmatian allies in present day Hungary. Also in these mountainous regions Tacitus places the Buri tribe, who Tacitus describes as speaking a similar Suebian language. In the second century the geographer Ptolemy described the position of the Buri as being near the sources of the Vistula river.

Despite the occasional tensions, the Quadi and their Suebi neighbours had a relatively stable relationship with the Romans as a client state during this period, but this was interrupted under emperor Domitian during the years 89-97, after the Quadi and Marcomanni refused to assist in a conflict against the Dacians. According to Dio Cassius, Domitian reacted by entering Pannonia to make war, killed the peace envoys sent to him, but was then defeated by the Marcomanni. This campaign was referred to as the war against the Suebi, or the Suebi and Sarmatians, or the Marcomanni, Quadi and Sarmatians. The relationship then stabilized again in the time of emperor Nerva.

== Second century ==
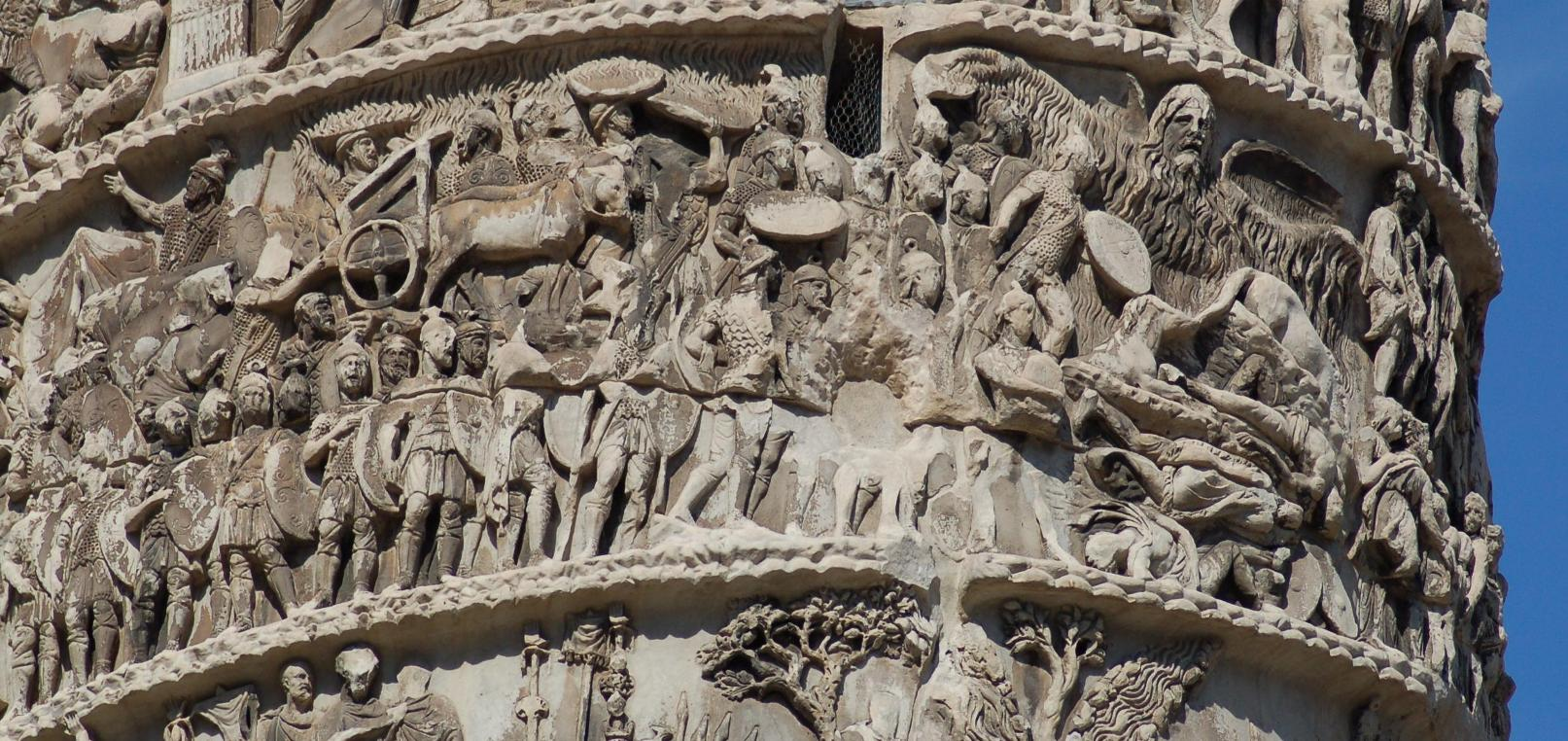
The "Miracle of the Rain" depicted on the Column of Marcus Aurelius in Rome

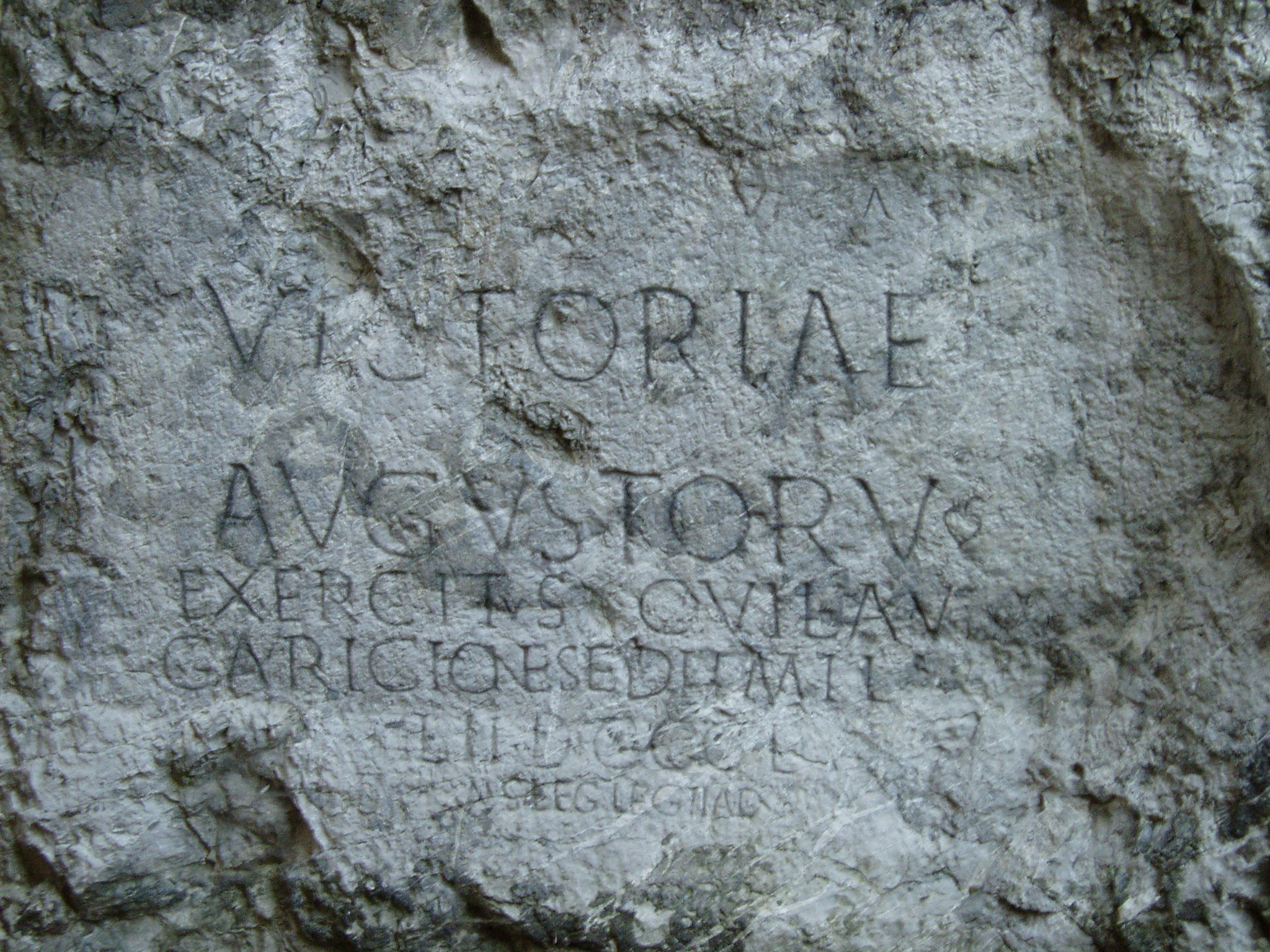
A monument found in Trenčín. "To the victory of emperor dedicated by 855 soldiers of II. Legion of an army stationed in Laugaricio. Made to order of Marcus Valerius Maximianus, a legate of the Second Auxiliary legion."

The relationship between the Romans and the Quadi and their neighbours was far more seriously and permanently disrupted during the long series of conflicts called the Marcomannic wars, which were fought mainly during the rule of emperor Marcus Aurelius (reigned 161–180).

In the 150s or 160s, 6000 Langobardi (Lombards originally from present-day north Germany) and Obii (whose identity is uncertain) crossed the Lower Danube into Roman territory where they were quickly defeated. Dio Cassius reports that these events worried several of the barbarian nations. A group of them selected Ballomarius, king of the Marcomanni, and ten other representatives of the other nations, in a peace mission to the governor of Roman Pannonia. Oaths were sworn and the envoys returned home. Some scholars think the Quadi may have been involved in this raid, or at least allowed it to happen. However the Quadi and their neighbours were facing their own problems with raiders from further north, and had been trying for some time to get more support from the empire. On their side, the Romans were apparently planning for a Germania campaign, and knew that Italy itself was threatened by these pressures, but were deliberately diplomatic while they were occupied with the Parthian campaign in the Middle East, and badly affected by the Antonine plague. However, the Historia Augusta especially blames the Marcomanni and Victohali for throwing everything into confusion while other tribes had been driven on by the more distant barbarians.

Although a Roman offensive could not start in 167, two new legions were raised and in 168 the two emperors, Lucius Verus and Marcus Aurelius, set out to cross the alps. Either in 167, before the Romans setting, or in 169, after the Romans came to a stop when Verus died, the Marcomanni and Quadi led a crossing of the Danube, and an attack into Italy itself. They destroyed Opitergium (present-day Oderzo) and put the important town of Aquileia under siege. Whatever the exact sequence of events, the Historia Augusta says that with the Romans in action several kings of the barbarians retreated, and some of the barbarians put anti-Roman leaders to death. In particular, the Quadi, having lost their king, announced they would not confirm an elected successor without approval from the emperors.

Marcus Aurelius returned to Rome but headed north again in the autumn of 169. He established a Danubian headquarters in Carnuntum between present-day Vienna and Bratislava. From here he could receive embassies from the different peoples north of the Danube. Some were given the possibility to settle in the empire, others were recruited to fight on the Roman side. The Quadi were pacified, and in 171 they agreed to leave their coalition, and returned deserters and 13,000 prisoners of war. They supplied horses and cattle as war contributions, and promised not to allow Marcomanni or Jazyges passage through their territory. By 173 the Quadi had rebelled again, and they expelled their Roman-approved king Furtius, replaced by Ariogaisos. In a major battle between 172 and 174, a Roman force was almost defeated, until a sudden rainstorm allowed them to defeat the Quadi. The incident is well-known because of the account given by Dio Cassius, and on the Column of Marcus Aurelius in Rome. By 175 the cavalry from the Marcomanni, Naristae, and Quadi were forced to travel to the Middle East, and in 176 Marcus Aurelius and his son Commodus held a triumph as victors over Germania and Sarmatia.

The situation remained disturbed in subsequent years. The Romans declared a new war in 177 and set off in 178, against the Marcomanni, Hermunduri, Sarmatians, and Quadi as specific enemies. Rome executed a successful and decisive battle against them in 179 at Laugaricio (present-day Trenčín in Slovakia) under the command of legate and procurator Marcus Valerius Maximianus. By 180 AD the Quadi and Marcomanni were in a state of occupation, with Roman garrisons of 20,000 men each permanently stationed in both countries. The Romans even blocked the mountain passes so that they could not migrate north to live with the Semnones. Marcus Aurelius was considering the creation of a new imperial province called Marcomannia when he died in 180.

== Third century ==
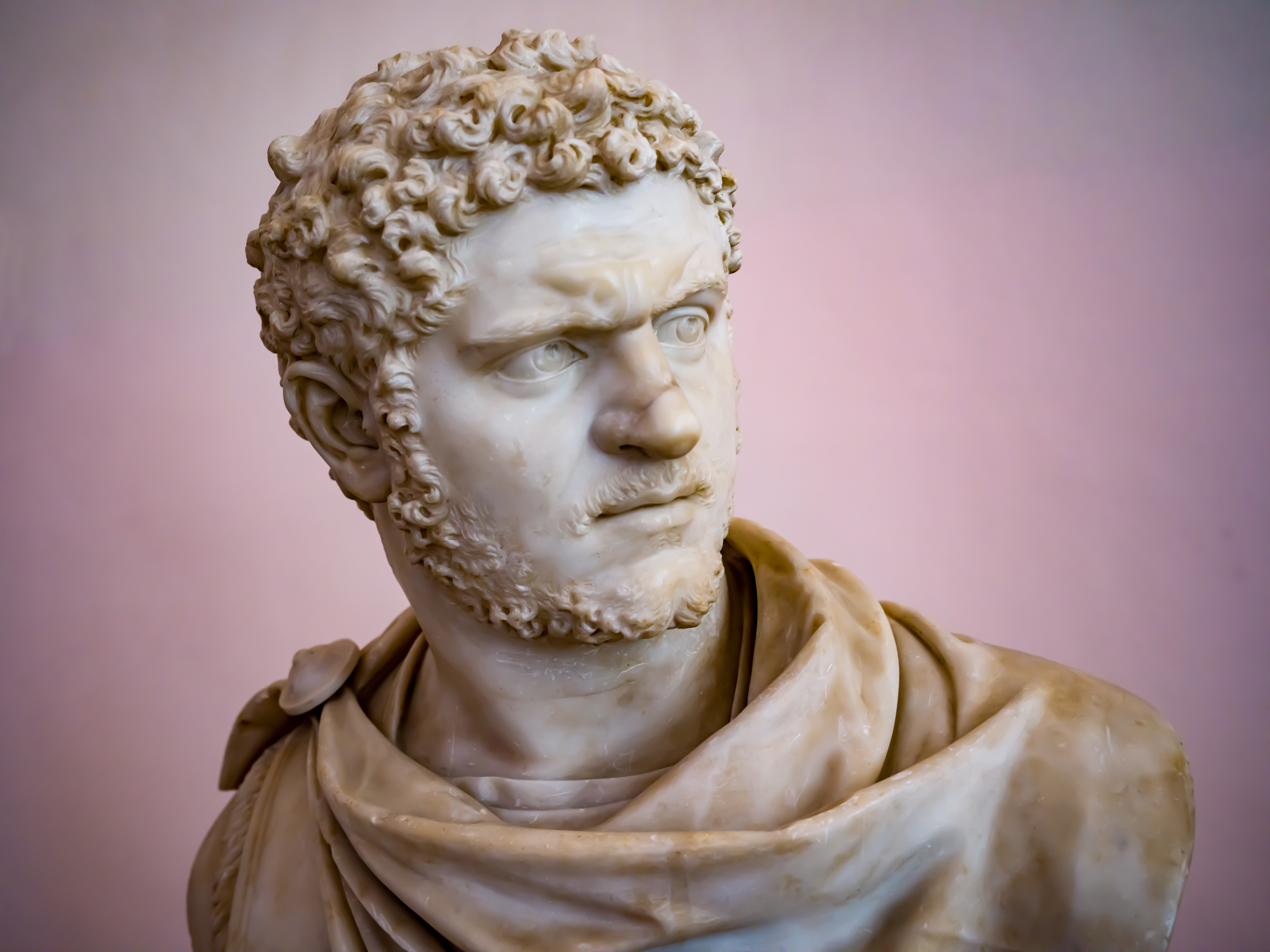
Caracalla: Museo Nazionale Napoli

After the defeat of the Quadi and their allies there were major changes among the barbarians outside the Roman borders. Powerful new peoples were mentioned for the first time, including the Suevian Allemanni and Juthungi to the west of the Quadi, and the Goths to the east. Within the empire itself there was turmoil and instability — the so-called Crisis of the Third Century.

Around 214/215 AD, Dio Cassius reports that because of raids into Pannonia, the emperor Caracalla invited the Quadi king Gaiobomarus to meet him, and then had him executed. According to this report Caracalla "claimed that he had overcome the recklessness, greed, and treachery of the Germans by deceit, since these qualities could not be conquered by force", and he was proud of the "enmity with the Vandili and the Marcomani, who had been friends, and in having executed Gaïobomarus".

During the reign of Philip the Arab (reigned 244-249), who cut off gifts which were being paid to Ukrainian Goths under the rule of Ostrogotha, the 6th century writer Jordanes believed that the Marcomanni were paying tribute to Ostrogotha, and the princes of the Quadi were effectively slaves of the Goths.

By the middle of the third century the Quadi seem to have rejected their client relationship with Rome, and they began a series of attacks which they organized together with their eastern neighbours the Sarmatians. Together they repeatedly attacked Illyricum. There was a Roman campaign against the Quadi in 283-284 AD, and as a result emperor Carinus (co-emperor 283-285) and Numerian (co-emperor 284-285) celebrated this as two personal triumphs in 283 and 284. Nevertheless the Quadi were again mentioned among attacking Germanic tribes in 285 AD. This situation seems to have been pacified in the time of Diocletian (reigned 284-305).

== Fourth century ==
In the first part of the 4th century there is evidence that the Quadi had developed a better relationship with the Romans. Their region of influence spread down the Danube towards present-day Budapest and it seems that their economy support a wealthy Romanised nobility.

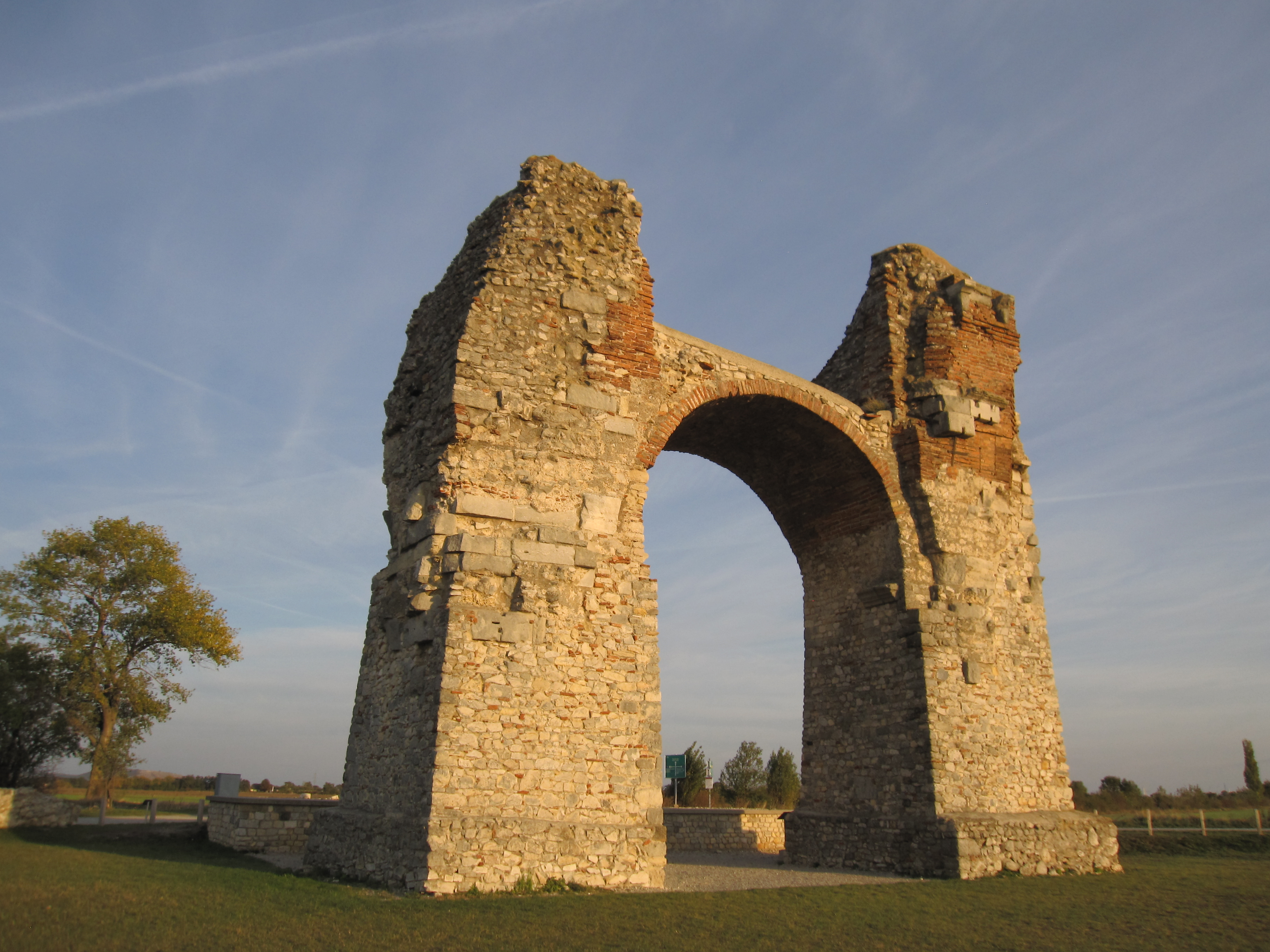
The so-called Heidentor in Carnuntum.

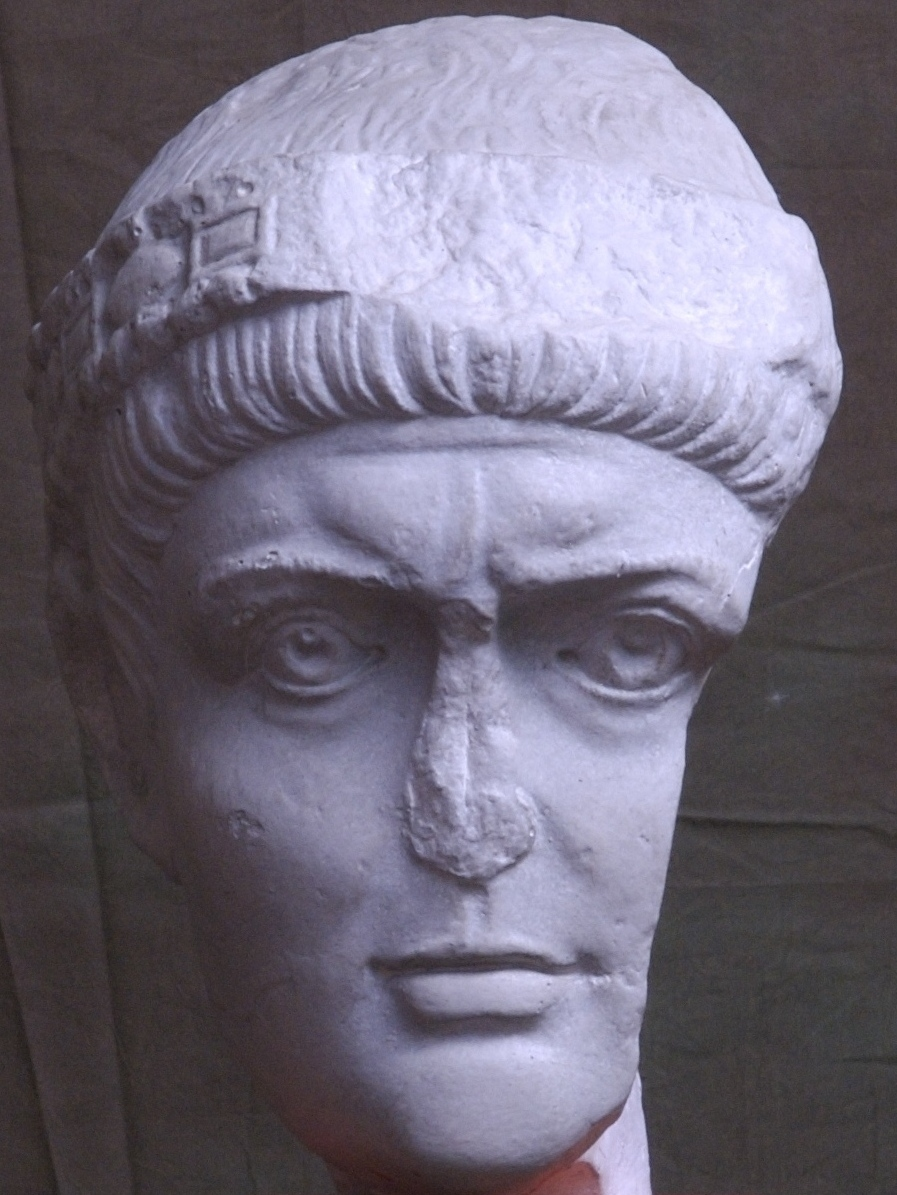
Restored head of Valentinian I

In 357 a new phase of confrontation began during the reign of Constantius II (reigned 337-361) which gives insight into the way in which the culture of the Quadi had become more similar to that of the Sarmatians and their eastern neighbours. The Quadi and Sarmatians were making raids across the Danube into Roman Pannonia and Moesia. The account given by Ammianus Marcellinus shows that in this period the Quadi had become more accustomed to actions on horseback. He reported that the involved Quadi and Sarmatians "were neighbours and had like customs and armour", "better fitted for brigandage than for open warfare, have very long spears and cuirasses made from smooth and polished pieces of horn, fastened like scales to linen shirts". They had "swift and obedient horses" and they generally had more than one, "to the end that an exchange may keep up the strength of their mounts and that their freshness may be renewed by alternate periods of rest".

In 358 the emperor crossed the Danube and resistance quickly fell apart. The leaders who came to negotiate with the emperor represented different parts of the populations who had participated. An important one was prince Araharius, who ruled "a part of the Transiugitani and the Quadi". An inferior of his was Usafer, a prominent noble, who led "some of the Sarmatians". In the negotiations the emperor declared that the Sarmatians were Roman dependents and demanded hostages. He then learned that there had been social upheaval among the Sarmatians, and some of the nobility had even fled to other countries. He gave them a new king, Zizais, a young prince who was the first leader to surrender. He then met with Vitrodorus the son of Viduarius the King of the Quadi. They also gave hostages and they drew their swords "which they venerate as gods" in order to swear loyalty. As a next step he moved to the mouth of the Tisza and slaughtered or enslaved many of the Sarmatians who lived on the other side and had felt themselves protected by the river from the Romans. King Viduarius was probably king of the western Quadi. Constantius erected a triumphal arch in Carnuntium, today known as the Heidentor, but raids did not stop.

Some years after the death of Constantius, the new emperor Valentinian I (reigned 364-375) reinforced the borders. He fortified the northern and eastern banks of the Danube, and by 373 AD he ordered construction of a garrisoned fort within Quadi territory itself. In 374, when complaints from the Quadi delayed construction the Roman general charged with getting it done invited their king Gabinius to dinner and then murdered him. As Ammianus wrote "the Quadi, who had long been quiet, were suddenly aroused to an outbreak". Neighbouring tribes including the Sarmatians sprung into action and began raids across the Danube, repulsing the Roman military's first poorly coordinated attempts to confront them.

Valentinian moved to the Danube border and went first to Carnuntum, which was damaged and deserted, and then Aquincum (now part of Budapest). He sent one force north into the Quadi heartlands, and took another force across the Danube near present-day Budapest, where the enemies had settlements, and they slaughtered everyone they could find. He then made his winter quarters on the Roman side of the Danube in Bregetio (present-day Komárom). Here Quadi envoys came to plead for peace. However, when they maintained that the building of a barrier was begun "unjustly and without due occasion", thus arousing rude spirits to anger, Valentinian became enraged, then sick, and died. His death ended this round of conflict, and the Romans and Quadi were soon preoccupied with bigger problems in the Danubian region.

In 380 the Romans suffered a major defeat at the Battle of Adrianople, which was caused by a sudden movement of peoples including Goths, Alans and Huns coming from present-day Ukraine. According to Ammianus, the region of the Marcomanni and Quadi were among the areas first affected by the "a savage horde of unknown peoples, driven from their abodes by sudden violence". Although there is no consensus about the details, the Romans tried new approaches to settling newcomers in large numbers. One of the armed groups responsible for the defeat, led by Alatheus and Saphrax, were settled into the Pannonian part of the Roman empire, near the Quadi homeland, and expected to do military service for Rome.

It is not clear how the Quadi reacted to the changed situation, but their name no longer appears in the records of this region. It is however likely that many crossed into Roman territory while others participated in the large movements of mixed peoples which were happening on both sides of the Danube. After the death of emperor Theodosius I in 395, Saint Jerome listed the Marcomanni and Quadi together with several of the eastern peoples causing devastation in the Roman provinces stretching from Constantinople to the Julian Alps, including Dalmatia, and all the provinces of Pannonia: "Goths and Sarmatians, Quadi and Alans, Huns and Vandals and Marcomanni". Claudian describes them crossing the frozen Danube with wagons, and then setting wagons rigged around themselves like a wall at the approach of the Roman commander Stilicho. He says that all the fertile lands between the Black Sea and Adriatic were subsequently like uninhabited deserts, specifically including Dalmatia and Pannonia. At the same time, the Gothic general Alaric I, who had loyally served with his Gothic troops under Theodosius I at the Battle of Frigidus only a few months early, was beginning his rebellion, and started leading his army south, first towards Constantinople, and later towards Greece. This was triggered by internal Roman conflicts after the death of Theodosius. Claudian claimed that they were all incited by an Eastern Roman consul and enemy of Stilicho, Rufinus. The exact connection between Alaric and those who crossed the Danube remains unclear.

== After the fourth century ==
=== Second letter of Saint Jerome ===
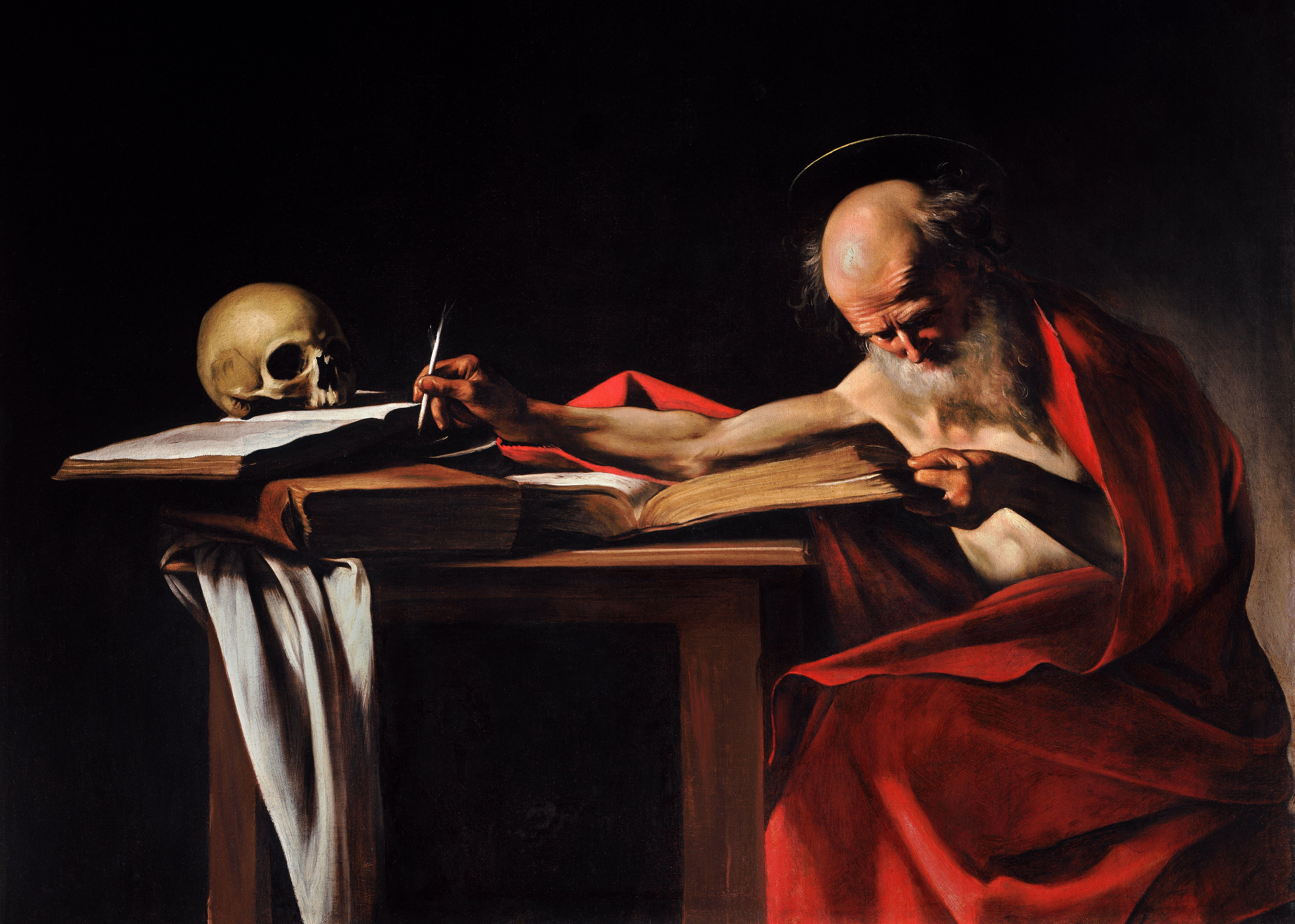
Saint Jerome Writing (c. 1605–1606). Oil on canvas, 112 x 157 cm (44 x 61.8 in). Galleria Borghese, Rome

The last contemporary mention of the Quadi as an identifiable people is in another letter by Saint Jerome from 409, but it places them far from home. He lists them first among the peoples who were occupying Gaul at that time: "Quadi, Vandals, Sarmatians, Alans, Gepids, Herules, Saxons, Burgundians, Allemanni and—alas! for the commonweal!—even Pannonians". Scholars note that apart from the Saxons, Burgundians and Alemanni, who were already well-known near the Rhine, and the Alans who were newcomers from Ukraine who had already played an important role in the Roman military, the others appear to have been long-term neighbours from the Middle Danube area. The Vandals and Sarmatians listed next after the Quadi are generally understood to include the Hasdingi Vandals and Sarmatians who had been eastern neighbours of the Quadi for centuries. The Pannonians from within the empire were the Quadi's long-term neighbours to the south. The Cosmographia written by Julius Honorius, and Liber Generationis, indicate that the Heruli were already settled on the Danube near the Marcomanni and Quadi for some time. The Gepids had already settled somewhere near their future location in Dacia in the 3rd century, among the Quadi's eastern neighbours.

The chain of events which led to large numbers of Middle Danubian people to suddenly move west along the Danube, towards Gaul, are not well understood but several are frequently discussed.

- In 401, the poet Claudian described how Raetia was troubled by the local Vindelici there while Stilicho was preoccupied in Italy with the invasion of Alaric, a Gothic military leader from inside the empire. According to Claudian, "the peoples (gentes) broken their treaties (foedera, implying a pact with non-Romans) and, encouraged by the news of Latium's trouble, had seized upon the glades of Vindelicia and the fields of Noricum". The text says that Stilicho's victorious forces earned "Vandal spoils" (Vandalicis ... spoliis), and so assuming he was not referring to the local Vindelici, many scholars believe Vandals were involved. Furthermore, there are proposals that they included the same Vandal groups who later went to Hispania, including both Silingi and Hasdingi. This would mean that Vandals had already moved and gather near the Rhine.
- In 406, the year of the Rhine crossing of the Vandals and Alans, Radagaisus, a Gothic leader from outside the empire, attacked Italy with a very large force from the Middle Danube itself. Modern scholars have proposed various connections between these events and the movement westwards of the Vandals and others.

=== Kingdom of the Suevi in Gallaecia ===
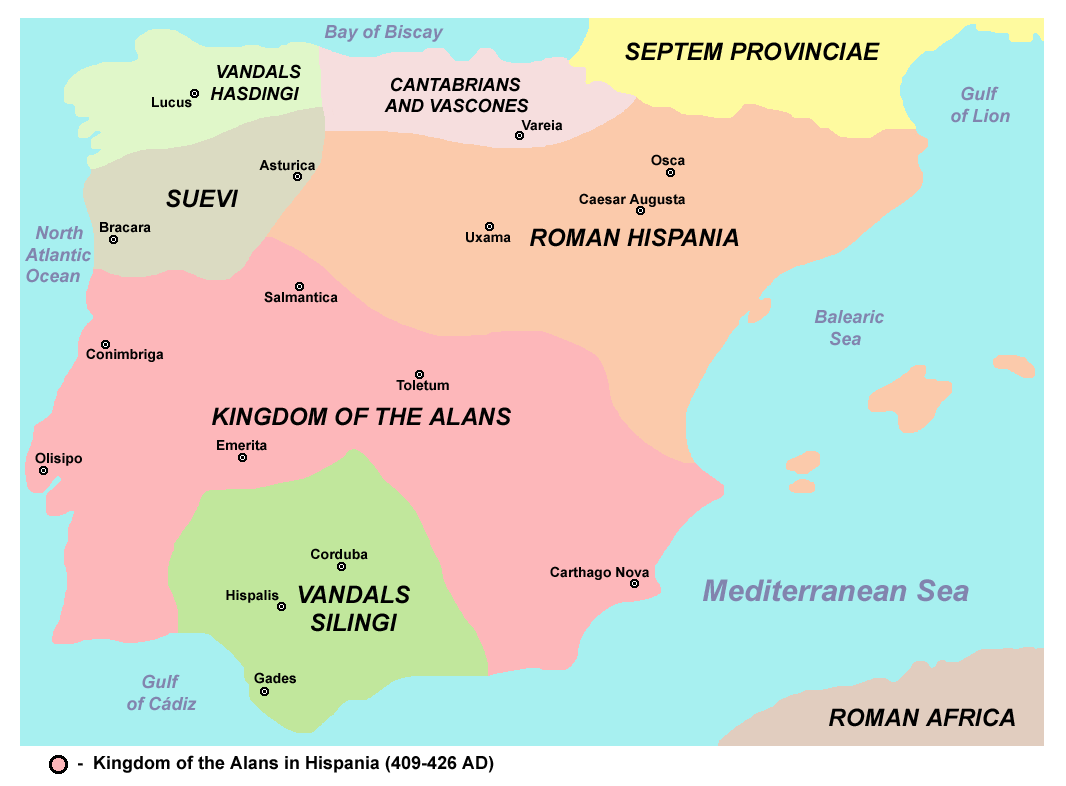
Hispania divided

Many scholars believe that the Quadi listed by Jerome in 409, and perhaps most of those listed, must have previously entered Gaul in a large and coordinated crossing of the Rhine involving Vandals and Alans, which is traditionally dated to 31 December 406 AD. Another common proposal is that these Quadi changed their name to Suevi, never used the old name anymore, and then coordinated with the Vandals and Alans to conquer Hispania. Some modern scholars propose that the Quadi among the Spanish Suevi lost their name because this was a mixed group which included Quadi along with other types of Suevi. Because of the incomplete records, scholars also take different positions about how many Quadi moved to Hispania, but Castritius, for example, believed that the majority of the Quadi became Suevi and finished up in Spain. Not all scholars agree. Others propose that the Hispania Suevi were from other Suevian groups. For example, medieval historians such as Gregory of Tours understood them to be Alemanni. Reynolds proposed that the Spanish Suevi were from present-day northern Germany, and could have come by ship.

There is no record which specifically connects Quadi with the crossing of 406, but there are two near-contemporary records which imply that Suevi were involved. Hydatius says that in the autumn of 409 when the Alans and the Hasdingi and Silingi Vandals entered Hispania they were together with Suevi. Orosius specified that Suevi fought at the same crossing when the Franks attempted to defend Gaul against the Vandals. He even believed that the Suevi, Vandals, Alans and Burgundians were all part of a heretical movement driven by the Roman military leader Stilicho, whose father was a Vandal officer in the Roman army, and who wanted to destabilize Gaul for his own benefit. (Such accusations against Stilicho are not accepted by modern scholars.) These sources are sometimes seen as supporting the proposal that the Quadi in Gaul must have changed their name to "Suevi".

Arguing against the proposal that the Quadi became the Iberian Suevi, Reynolds argued in 1957 that if the Suevi in Spain were Quadi, then it is inconceivable that they and others writing about them would give up and even forget this famous name. He also argued that Hydatius and Orosius are not reliable for the events involved. He noted for example that in disagreement with Hydatius, the Gallic Chronicle of 452 registered the Suevi as arriving in Hispania already in 408, before the letter of Jerome, and before the Vandals and Alans.

When the Vandals, Alans and Suevi arrived in Hispania, it was under the control of a rebel Roman general Gerontius who came to agreements with them as military allies in his struggle against Roman forces. The groups proceeded to divide Hispania between themselves into four kingdoms, with the agreement of Gerontius. After the defeat of Gerontius, the Roman authorities rejected these agreements, and the Visigoths began to work against the four kingdoms. After many of the Vandals and Alans moved to Carthage, the Suevi were the last of them to hold an independent kingdom, which they succeeded to hold until 585, when they became part of the Visigothic kingdom.

=== The Kingdom of the "Danube Suevi" ===
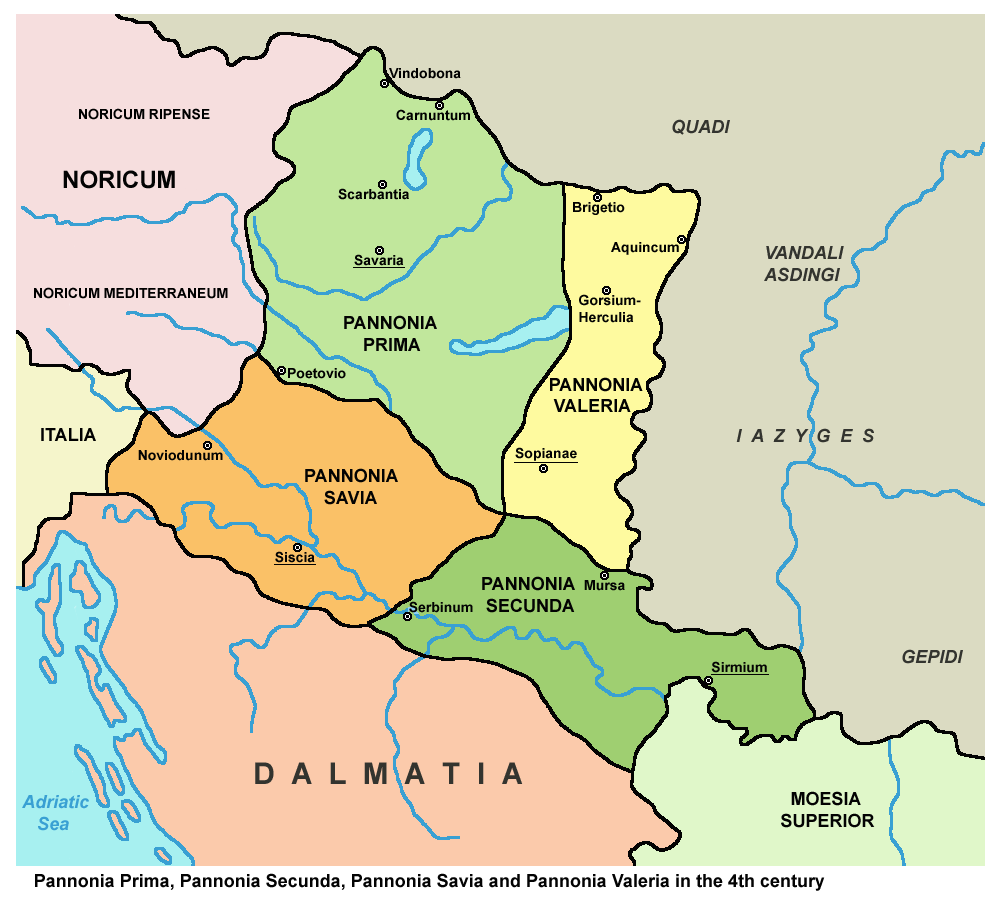
4th-century Roman Pannonia

By the early 5th century the Middle Danube region had come under the domination of the Huns and their allies, and Roman power was ineffective there. In 427 the chronicle of Marcellinus Comes says that the provinces of Pannonia, "which had been held by the Huns for fifty years, were reclaimed by the Romans". However, in 433 Flavius Aëtius effectively ceded Pannonia to Attila.

Although there is no direct contemporary evidence that the Quadi continued to exist as subjects of Attila under their old name, centuries later Paulus Diaconus listed them among the subject peoples who Attila could call upon. In addition to the better-known Goths and Gepids he listed "Marcomanni, Suebi, Quadi, and alongside them the Herules, Thuringi and Rugii". Taken at face value this implies that the Quadi might for example have been present at the Battle of the Catalaunian Plains in 451, fighting for Attila. However this is a much later source, and modern scholars especially doubt whether the Marcomanni or Quadi would still have been identified under those names in 451, because more contemporary sources never mention these names anymore in this period.

After the death of Attila in 453 some of the smaller peoples who had lived under his hegemony begin to appear in more records, but instead of the Marcomanni and Quadi, only Suevians appear. After the Battle of Nedao in 454, when the sons of Attila and their Ostrogothic allies were defeated, the victors were able to consolidate independent kingdoms north of the Middle Danube. The largest and longest lasting, the Gepids, was based in Dacia. To the west, north of the Danube where the Marcomanni and Quadi had been were the Rugii, Heruli, and Sciri. And on the south of that stretch of the Danube, in what used to be the northern part of Roman Pannonia Valeria, a Suevian kingdom also existed. As in the case of the Suevi in Hispania, many scholars believe that this group included Suevian peoples such as the Quadi who had previously gone by other names. Herwig Wolfram for example:

The Marcomanni and the Quadi gave up their special names after crossing the Danube, in fact both the emigrants and the groups remaining in Pannonia became Suebi again. The Pannonian Suebi became subjects of the Huns. After the battle at the Nadao they set up their kingdom, and when it fell, they came, successively under Herulian and Longobard rule, south of the Danube under Gothic rule, and eventually again under Longobard rule.

Writing in the 6th century, Jordanes reported a series of conflicts in the 460s between a Suevian king Hunimund and the Ostrogothic king Thiudimir, whose people had settled within the Roman empire just to the south. In 467 or 468, Hunimund led a campaign into Dalmatia. In German scholarship the Suebi of this post-Atilla Middle Danubian kingdom are called Donausueben, meaning Danubian or Danube Suevi. After stealing Gothic cattle, the Suevi were attacked near Lake Balaton by Thiudimir, and Hunimund was captured. He was subsequently released from Gothic captivity after he submitted and adopted as Thiudimir's "son by arms" (filius per arma). However, in 468 or early 469, Hunimund plotted with the Sciri and attacked the Ostrogothic king Valamir. Valamir lost his life, but the Sciri and Suevi lost the battle, and the Sciri were almost destroyed. A little later, in 469, at the Battle of Bolia, Hunimund and Alaric, apparently both kings of the Suevi, called upon the Sarmatians, and the remnants of the Sciri, led by Edica and Hunwulf, and also the Gepids and Rugians. However, Thiudimir and his Goths defeated these allies, confirming their position as dominant power in this region (from which they would later invade Italy under Theoderic the Great). According to Jordanes, Hunimund and his Suevi fled westwards and joined with the Alemanni, in an Alpine region where streams that flowed loudly into the Upper Danube, Baiuvarii (early Bavarians) on the east, Franks on the west, Burgundians on the south, and Thuringians to the north. Here, during the cold winter of 469/470, Thiudimir attacked Hunimund's Suevi unexpectedly after suddenly crossing the frozen Danube. Thiudimir returned as victor to his own home in Pannonia. It is considered likely that Hunimund and at least some of his people escaped this defeat and that he is also the warlord of that name who was mentioned by Eugippius in his biography of Saint Severinus of Noricum. Although the Alemannic king Gibuld respected the saint, after a retreat of Roman military defence in the area this Hunimund attacked Saint Severinus's community at Passau with a group of "barbarians". Passau was also troubled by the Alemanni.

Some of the Suevi continued to live in the Pannonian area, possibly under Gothic control, while the Rugii and Heruli continued to rule territories north of the Danube. It may also be during this period that some Suevi settled south of the Drava river in a region more directly under Gothic control and known during this time as Suavia. The Rugii kingdom was destroyed by Odoacer in 488, and the Ostrogoths and the remaining Rugii left the Danube to invade Odoacer's Italian kingdom in 493. The Suebian Lombards, having migrated in stages from the north, now entered the old territory of the Rugii, and some years later they destroyed the Heruli kingdom. In the early 6th century, the Lombard king Waccho was said in later Lombardic accounts to have conquered a Suebian kingdom which still existed in the region.

=== Alemanni, Lombards, and Bavarians and Slavs ===
The alliance of Hunimund with the Alemanni has been interpreted as evidence of a new Alemannic-Suebi ethnogenesis in the second half of the 5th century, which could explain the documented use of the Suevi name to refer to the Alemanni after about 500.

Many of the Suevi who remained in the Pannonian region are believed to have taken up a Lombardic identity after the defeat of the Ostrogoths by the emperor Justinian, and many may therefore have subsequently entered Italy with the Lombards. The region subsequently came under the control of the Pannonian Avars, and it is probably during this period that Slavic languages eventually became dominant in the areas where the Quadi had lived.

The record which mentions the Suebi joining the Alemanni is also one of the first records mentioning the early Bavarians, or Baiuvarii, who were also living south of the Danube, to the east of the Alemanni, in what had been Roman territory. It is generally believed that their name is Germanic, and that it indicates an origin in one of the regions once inhabited by the Boii. It is therefore considered very likely that the Baiuvarii were an armed group with a kinship to the Marcomanni and Quadi.

== Sources ==
- Beljak, Ján; Kolník, Titus (2008), "Germanic settlement from the Late Roman and Early Migration periods in Štúrovo", in Niezabitowska-Wisniewska; Juscinski; Luckiewicz; Sadowski (eds.), The turbulent epoch : new materials from the Late Roman Period and the Migration Period I, Uniwersytet Marii Curie-Sklodowskiej, Lublin
- Beneš, Zdeněk; Bursák, Daniel (2017), "Plaňany-Group in Bohemia. Three case studies with an emphasis on ceramics", in Michałowski; Teska; Niedzielski; Żółkiewski (eds.), Settlements Pottery of the pre-Roman Iron Age in Central European Barbaricum – new research perspectives, Poznań
- Bochnak, Tomasz (2021), "Cum grano salis, or about the Anartophracti in the Słonne Mountains", Acta Archaeologica Carpathica, 56: 309–334, doi:10.4467/00015229AAC.21.011.15352
- Castritius, Helmut (2005), "Sweben", in Beck, Heinrich; Geuenich, Dieter; Steuer, Heiko (eds.), Reallexikon der Germanischen Altertumskunde, vol. 30 (2 ed.), De Gruyter, ISBN 978-3-11-018385-6
- Castritius, Helmut (2006), "Wandalen", in Beck, Heinrich; Geuenich, Dieter; Steuer, Heiko (eds.), Reallexikon der Germanischen Altertumskunde, vol. 33 (2 ed.), De Gruyter, ISBN 978-3-11-018388-7
- Danielisova, Betka (2020), "Bohemia at the End of the La Tène Period: Objects, Materials, Chronology, and Main Development Trends - A Review", Památky Archeologické, 111: 113–157, doi:10.35686/PA2020.3
- Dobesch, Gerhard (2002), "Obii (Obioi)", in Beck, Heinrich; Geuenich, Dieter; Steuer, Heiko (eds.), Reallexikon der Germanischen Altertumskunde, vol. 21 (2 ed.), De Gruyter, ISBN 978-3-11-017272-0
- Droberjar, Eduard (2018), "The Emergence of the Suebi and Further Developments in Bohemia", In tempore sueborum. El tiempo de los Suevos en la Gallaecia (411–585). El primer reino medieval de Occidente, Volumen de estudios, pp. 35–44
- Goffart, Walter (2006), Barbarian Tides: The Migration Age and the Later Roman Empire, University of Pennsylvania Press, ISBN 0-8122-3939-3
- Halsall, Guy (2007). Barbarian Migration and the Roman West, 376-568. Cambridge University Press. doi:10.1017/CBO9780511802393. ISBN 978-0-521-43491-1.
- Hamann, Stefanie (1973), "Bajuwaren II. Historisches (Stand: 1973) § 4. Herkunft und erste Siedlung", in Beck, Heinrich; Geuenich, Dieter; Steuer, Heiko (eds.), Reallexikon der Germanischen Altertumskunde, vol. 1 (2 ed.), De Gruyter, ISBN 978-3-11-004489-8
- Heather, Peter (1995), "The Huns and the End of the Roman Empire in Western Europe", The English Historical Review, 110 (435): 4–41, doi:10.1093/ehr/CX.435.4, JSTOR 573374
- Heather, Peter (2009), Empires and Barbarians. The Fall of Rome and the Birth of Europe, Oxford University Press, ISBN 9780199735600
- Hofeneder, Andreas (2003), "Quaden § 2. Historisches", in Beck, Heinrich; Geuenich, Dieter; Steuer, Heiko (eds.), Reallexikon der Germanischen Altertumskunde, vol. 23 (2 ed.), De Gruyter, ISBN 978-3-11-017535-6
- Kehne, Peter (2001), "Markomannenkrieg § 1. Historisches", in Beck, Heinrich; Geuenich, Dieter; Steuer, Heiko (eds.), Reallexikon der Germanischen Altertumskunde, vol. 19 (2 ed.), De Gruyter, ISBN 978-3-11-017163-1
- Kolník, Titus (2003), "Quaden § 3. Historische Angaben und archäologischer Hintergrund", in Beck, Heinrich; Geuenich, Dieter; Steuer, Heiko (eds.), Reallexikon der Germanischen Altertumskunde, vol. 23 (2 ed.), De Gruyter, ISBN 978-3-11-017535-6
- Komoróczy, Balázs; Vlach, Marek; Rajtár, Ján (2020), "A companion to the archaeological sources of Roman military interventions into the Germanic territory north of the Danube during the Marcomannic Wars", in Erdrich; Komoróczy; Madejski; Vlach (eds.), Marcomannic Wars and the Antonine Plague. Selected essays on two disasters that shook the Roman World, Czech Academy of Sciences, Institute of Archaeology, Brno; Uniwersytet Marii Curie-Sklodowskiej, Lublin, ISSN 1804-1345
- Kulikowski, Michael (2007), Rome's Gothic Wars: From the Third Century to Alaric, Key Conflicts of Classical Antiquity, Cambridge University Press, doi:10.1017/CBO9781139167277, ISBN 978-0-521-84633-2
- Kulikowski, Michael (2019). Imperial Tragedy: From Constantine's Empire to the Destruction of Roman Italy AD 363-568 (The Profile History of the Ancient World Series). New York: Profile Books. ISBN 978-0-000-07873-5.
- Liccardo, Salvatore (2024), "Who in the world are the Heruli?", Early Medieval Europe, 32 (3): 284–305, doi:10.1111/emed.12712
- Meier, Mischa (2010), "Alarich I.", Germanische Altertumskunde Online, De Gruyter
- Neumann, Günter (2003), "Quaden § 1. Der Name", in Beck, Heinrich; Geuenich, Dieter; Steuer, Heiko (eds.), Reallexikon der Germanischen Altertumskunde, vol. 23 (2 ed.), De Gruyter, ISBN 978-3-11-017535-6
- Pohl, Walter (1998), "Gepiden §3. Historisches", Reallexikon der Germanischen Altertumskunde, vol. 11 (2 ed.), Walter de Gruyter, ISBN 3-11-015832-9
- Reichert, H. (2000). "Kampoi". In Beck, Heinrich; Geuenich, Dieter; Steuer, Heiko (eds.). Reallexikon der germanischen Altertumskunde. Vol. 16. Walter de Gruyter. pp. 214–215. ISBN 978-3-11-016782-5.
- Reimitz, Helmut (2000), "Hunimund", in Beck, Heinrich; Geuenich, Dieter; Steuer, Heiko (eds.), Reallexikon der Germanischen Altertumskunde, vol. 15 (2 ed.), Gruyter, pp. 245–246, ISBN 978-3-11-016649-1
- Reynolds, Robert (1957), "Reconsideration of the History of the Suevi", Revue belge de Philologie et d'Histoire, 35 (1): 19–47, doi:10.3406/rbph.1957.2022
- Soós, Eszter; Juhász, Lajos (2022), "Római kori leletek a Börzsönyből. A keleti kvád temetkezések kérdése/Roman-period finds from the Börzsöny mountains: reflections on the eastern quadic burials.", in Takács; Masek; Samu; Vida (eds.), Artificia Mirabilia. Tanulmányok Vaday Andrea tiszteletére/Studies in honour of Andrea Vaday, Bölcsészettudományi Központ Régészeti Intézet – Eötvös Loránd Kutatási Hálózat, Budapest
- Steinacher, Roland (2017), Rom und die Barbaren. Völker im Alpen- und Donauraum (300-600), Kohlhammer Verlag, ISBN 9783170251700
- Steuer, Heiko (2021), "Germanen" aus Sicht der Archäologie. Neue Thesen zu einem alten Thema, Ergänzungsbände zum Reallexikon der Germanischen Altertumskunde, vol. 125, De Gruyter
- Tejral, Jaroslav (2001), "Markomannenkrieg § 2. Archäologisches", in Beck, Heinrich; Geuenich, Dieter; Steuer, Heiko (eds.), Reallexikon der Germanischen Altertumskunde, vol. 19 (2 ed.), De Gruyter, ISBN 978-3-11-017163-1
- Wolfram, Herwig (1997), The Roman Empire and Its Germanic Peoples (translation of 1990 German ed.), University of California Press
