= François-Xavier Dillmann =

French philologist

- Born: 27 November 1949 (age 76)

Academic background
- Education: University of Caen Normandy
- Doctoral advisor: Frédéric Durand
- Influences: Georges Dumézil

Academic work
- Discipline: Germanic studies
- Sub-discipline: Old Norse studies
- Institutions: Heidelberg University; École pratique des hautes études
- Main interests: Old Norse literature; Old Norse religion; Runology

François-Xavier Dillmann (born 27 November 1949) is a French philologist who specializes in Old Norse studies.

== Biography ==
François-Xavier Dillmann was born on 27 November 1949. Dillmann studied at the Charles de Gaulle University – Lille III, Uppsala University, the University of Copenhagen, the University of Iceland, the University of Göttingen, LMU Munich, and the University of Caen Normandy. He received a Ph.D. in Germanic studies at Caen in 1976 with a thesis on runes in Old Norse literature, and another Ph.D. in Scandinavian philology in 1986 with a thesis on Old Norse religion. His supervisor was Frédéric Durand.

Since 1988, Dillmann has been Chair of the History and Philology of Ancient and Medieval Scandinavia at 4th Section (History and Philology) at the École pratique des hautes études. Dillmann is strongly influenced by the research of Georges Dumézil. He is the founder and President of the Société des études nordiques, and editor of its journal Proxima Thulé. He is a member of numerous learned societies, such as the Royal Gustavus Adolphus Academy, Royal Swedish Academy of Letters, History and Antiquities, the Royal Norwegian Society of Sciences and Letters, the Royal Society of the Humanities at Uppsala, the Norwegian Academy of Science and Letters, the Royal Society of Sciences in Uppsala, and a corresponding member of the Académie des Inscriptions et Belles-Lettres. Dillmann was written a number of works on Viking Age history and culture, Old Norse religion and literature, and runes.

Dillmann received an honorary doctorate from Uppsala University in 2001. Dillman has twice held residential fellowships (2009–10, Fall 2010) at the Swedish Collegium for Advanced Study in Uppsala, Sweden.

== Selected works ==
- Snorri Sturluson, L’Edda. Récits de mythologie nordique. Traduit du vieil islandais, introduit et annoté par François-Xavier Dillmann, Paris, Gallimard (L’aube des peuples), 1991, 233 p.
- Histoire des rois de Norvège (Heimskringla) par Snorri Sturluson. Première partie : Des origines mythiques de la dynastie à la bataille de Svold. Traduit du vieil islandais, introduit et annoté par François-Xavier Dillmann, Paris, Gallimard (L’aube des peuples), 2000, 706 p. [Cet ouvrage a été couronné par l’Académie royale Gustave Adolphe en novembre 2000.]
- Les magiciens dans l’Islande ancienne. Études sur la représentation de la magie islandaise et de ses agents dans les sources littéraires norroises, Upsal, Kungl. Gustav Adolfs Akademien för svenk folkkultur (Acta Academiae Regiae Gustavi Adolphi, XCII), 2006, XVIII – 779 p.

== See also ==
- Claude Lecouteux
- Lucien Musset

== Sources ==
- "François-Xavier DILLMANN". École pratique des hautes études. Archived from the original on 13 March 2018.
