= Edeko =

Chief of the Scirii

Edeko, with various spellings including Edekon, Aediko, Idikon and Edica, was a prominent military leader in the fifth-century multiethnic empire of Attila the Hun, before he died in 453 AD. "Edekon" was sent by Attila on a diplomatic mission to Constantinople in 448/9, which was reported in detail by the Roman diplomat and historian Priscus of Panium, who returned with Edeko to the headquarters of Attila.

Scholars generally also believe that this "Edekon" was the same as "Edica", who was one of the two chiefs of the Sciri in 468/9 after the death of Attila, mentioned by the 6th-century historian Jordanes. Many of these Sciri were killed in two battles against the increasingly powerful group of Goths who came to be known as the Ostrogoths, which was another of the groups who had previously been part of Attila's empire. It is not clear if Edeko survived the second battle, but the Sciri were not mentioned anymore as an independent people after this.

Two more records exist saying that Aediko or Idikon was the name of the father of the well-known military leader Odoacer, who became ruler of Roman Italy. One of these records specifically mentions that Odoacer himself was Scirian, and that his brother "Onulf" was the one who killed Armatus. Odoacer's brother Onoulphus is therefore normally equated to the second Scirian chief who fought together with "Edica", and whose name Jordanes spelled as "Hunuulf".

The ethnicity and language of Edeko and his family before they became part of Attila's empire has been a subject of disagreement among scholars, as contemporary sources describe the affiliations of Edeko and his two sons in several different ways. A Greek fragment from the Suda which describes Onoulphus as Thuringian on the paternal side, and Scirian on the maternal side, implies that Edeko's connection to the Sciri was through his wife. The term "Thuringian", which by implication applies to Edeko, was not much mentioned in this period, and scholars believe that the Suda was rightly or wrongly using it to refer to the group which Jordanes called the "Turcilingi" when describing Edeko's son Odoacer. Little is known about either the Thuringi or Turcilingi in the 5th century, and there is no consensus about whether the Thuringians and Turcilingi really were the same people.

== Original sources ==
Firstly, there is only one classical author, Priscus, who mentioned "Edekon" who was a prominent Hun, who served as both Attila's deputy, and his ambassador to the Byzantine Empire in 448/9. Priscus knew this Edekon personally. They travelled together from Constantinople to Attila, and Priscus reported subsequent discussions and events involving him at Attila's headquarters. Priscus described Edeko as both a Scythian, and someone who was of Hunnic birth (ὡς τοῦ Οὕννου γένος).

Priscus called Edeko Hunnic in a passage (fragment 7) contrasting him to Orestes, who was an official with a Roman background. A translator told him that while Orestes was a servant and secretary to Attila, Edeko, in contrast, was their best soldier and a Hun, therefore far surpassing Orestes in status among the Huns. Priscus describes Edeko as needing a translator during discussions in Constantinople, but he also describes the Huns of this time as using both Gothic and Hunnic languages. During the embassy the Romans separated Edeko and Orestes, and attempted to bribe Edeko to assassinate Attila. During this discussion Edeko confirmed that he had access to Attila as one of his retainers, entrusted with a garrison. Although he agreed to join this plot, Edeko exposed it to Attila when he returned to him.

Secondly, there are only two records which name the father of Odoacer. The Anonymous Valesianus reported that he was called "Aediko", and John of Antioch reported that his name was "Idikon". Both of these sources associated Odoacer with the Sciri.

Apart from noting that Odoacer's father was named Aediko, the Anonymous Valesianus noted that when Odoacer killed Orestes, he had Scirians with him. Also, confirming a connection going back to the time of Attila, "Orestes was a Pannonian, who joined with Attila at the time when he came to Rome, and was made his secretary".

John of Antioch described Odoacer as an ally of Ricimer in the time of emperor Anthemius (r. 467–472). He explicitly described Odoacer as "a man of the tribe called the Sciri, whose father was Edeco and whose brother was Onulf, who was both the bodyguard and then the murderer of Harmatius".

A third distinct mention is found in only one source, Jordanes, who described "Edica" as a chief of the Sciri. In the period after Attila's death, smaller ethnic kingdoms who had been part of his alliance appeared in the Middle Danubian region. Jordanes described how two of these, the Suebi and Sciri, were badly defeated by another—the Goths led by Valamir (the later "Ostrogoths"). Valamir himself, and almost all of the Sciri, were killed. Afterwards, the two leaders of the defeated Suevi, Hunimund and Alaric, called upon other groups to fight these Goths, now led by Valamir's brother Thiudimer. This included the "remnants of the Sciri", led by two chiefs named "Edica" and "Hunuulf", corresponding to the names of the father and brother of Odoacer according to John of Antioch. The Goths were victorious at the subsequent Battle of Bolia in 468/9.

== Etymology ==
Otto Maenchen-Helfen considered the name Ἐδέκων (Edekon) to be of Germanic or Germanized origin, but did not mention any derivation.

Omeljan Pritsak derived it from Old Turkic verbal root *edär- (to pursue, to follow), and deverbal noun suffix κων (kun < r-k < r-g < *gun). The reconstructed form is *edäkün (< *edär-kün; "follower, retainer").

== Bibliography ==
- Krautschick, Stefan (1986). "Zwei Aspekte des Jahres 476". Historia: Zeitschrift für Alte Geschichte (in German). 35 (3): 344–371. JSTOR 4435971.
- Maenchen-Helfen, Otto J. (1973). The World of the Huns: Studies in Their History and Culture. University of California Press. ISBN 9780520015968.
- Macbain, Bruce (1983), "Odovacer the Hun?", Classical Philology, 78 (4): 323–327, JSTOR 269961
- Martindale, John R., ed. (1980). The Prosopography of the Later Roman Empire: Volume II, AD 395–527. Cambridge: Cambridge University Press. p. 385. ISBN 0-521-20159-4. (convenience link)
- Pohl, Walter (1986), "Edika", in Beck, Heinrich; Geuenich, Dieter; Steuer, Heiko (eds.), Reallexikon der Germanischen Altertumskunde, vol. 6 (2 ed.), De Gruyter, pp. 446–447, ISBN 978-3-11-010468-4
- Pritsak, Omeljan (1982). The Hunnic Language of the Attila Clan (PDF). Vol. IV. Cambridge, Massachusetts: Harvard Ukrainian Research Institute. ISSN 0363-5570. Archived from the original (PDF) on 2016-12-13.
- Reynolds, Robert L.; Lopez, Robert S. (1946). "Odoacer: German or Hun?". The American Historical Review. 52 (1): 36–53. doi:10.1086/ahr/52.1.36. JSTOR 1845067.
