= Tudrus =

Ruler of the Quadi tribe

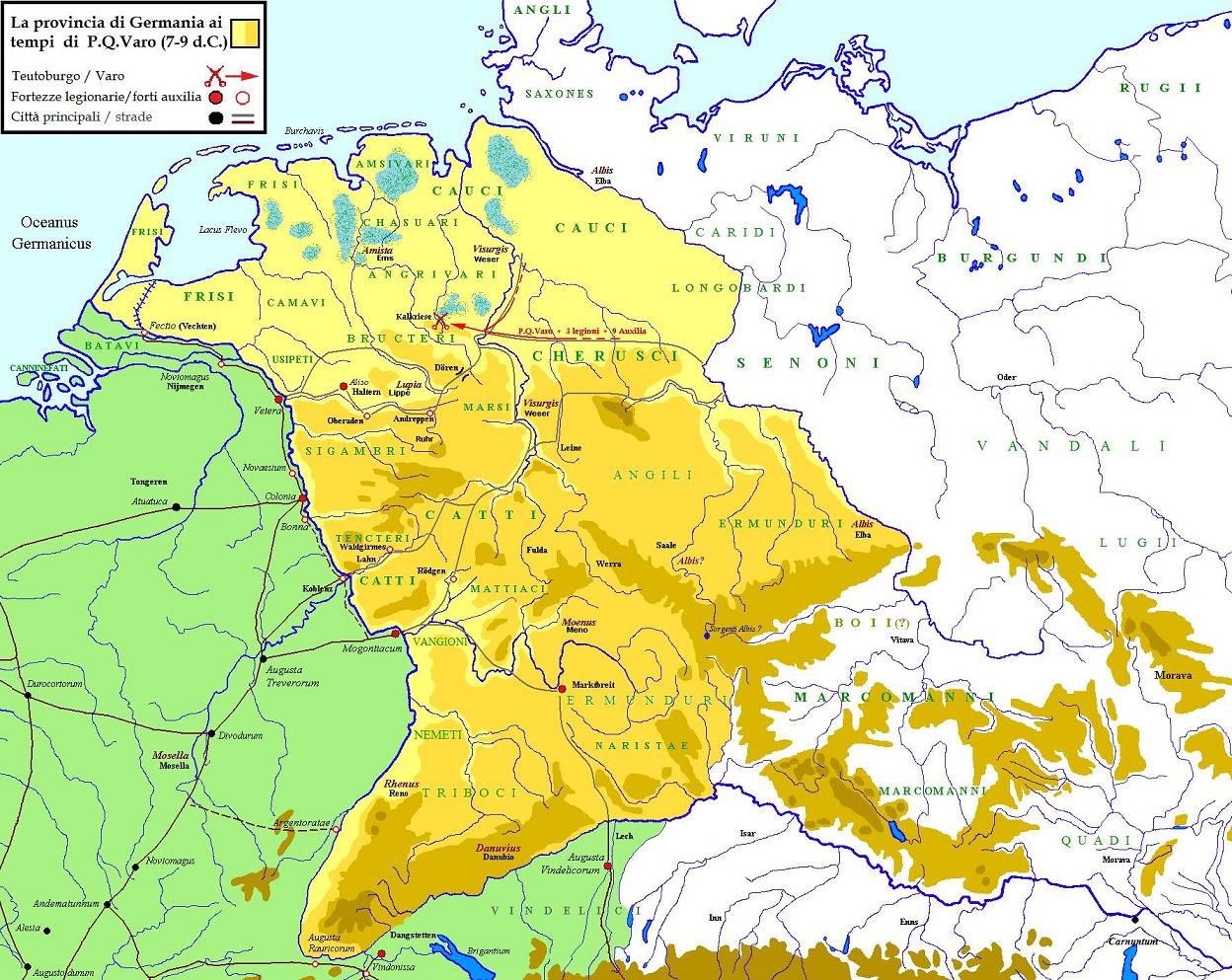
Germany 7-9th century

Tudrus (flourished in 1st century AD) was a ruler of the Quadi, a Germanic tribe, in the 1st century AD. He was a contemporary of Maroboduus of the Marcomanni. Like Maroboduus, Tudrus established a dynasty which ruled his people for many years after his death. Many of these rulers received financial and military support from the Roman Empire.

== Sources ==
- Tacitus. Germania.XLII
