= Harmatius =

Harmatius or Armatius (Ἁρμάτιος), may refer to:

- Harmatius, an ancient Greek sculptor whose name, along with that of Heracleides of Ephesus, appears inscribed on the restored statue of Ares housed in the Royal Museum in Paris.
- Armatus, also known as Harmatius, an Eastern Roman military commander.
