= Claude-Anne Lopez =

Belgian-American writer and scholar (1920–2012)

- Born: October 17, 1920; Belgium
- Died: December 28, 2012 (aged 92); New Haven, Connecticut, US
- Spouse: Roberto Sabatino Lopez

Academic work
- Institutions: Yale University
- Main interests: Benjamin Franklin

Claude-Anne Lopez (October 17, 1920 – December 28, 2012), born Claude-Anne Kirschen, was a Belgian-American writer and scholar who specialized in studies of Benjamin Franklin. Beginning with transcribing papers from French at Yale University, she became an associate editor of The Papers of Benjamin Franklin project and senior research scholar in history at Yale. She was a co-founder of the Friends of Franklin, an association devoted to his works.

She published many articles about Franklin, as well as three major studies of him. In her exploration of his private and family life, she was considered "one of the great Franklin scholars of our time." Her book The Private Franklin (1975) won the L.L. Winship/PEN New England Award in 1976.

== Early life and education ==
Born in Belgium about 1920, Claude-Anne Kirschen grew up with French as her native language. When she was in her late teens, she and her family immigrated as refugees to the United States in 1940 to escape Nazi occupation after the German invasion during World War II. They settled in New York City.

== Marriage and family ==
Kirschen worked in the French section of the Office of War Information in New York. There she met her future husband, Robert S. Lopez, a wartime refugee immigrant from Italy.

Kirschen married Lopez in 1946. That year they moved to New Haven, Connecticut, as he had been offered a position as assistant professor at Yale University. They had two sons, Michael and Lawrence.

== Franklin Papers Project ==
In the 1950s, Yale began a project in collaboration with the American Philosophical Society of Philadelphia, to publish the papers of Benjamin Franklin. (Thirty-seven volumes had been published by 2005.)

Lopez began working on the project, transcribing and translating papers from French, and later from Italian and German. Recognizing that she had insights to contribute, she published some articles on Franklin's personal life and was promoted to editor.

She went on to write and publish three major studies of his life concentrating on his private life. Her "former Yale colleague Jonathan Dull ranks Lopez as one of the 20th century's great Franklin scholars."

Her 1975 work, The Private Franklin: The Man and His Family, revealed new information. A review in The New England Quarterly, noting the difficulty of defining Franklin's character, described it as a "superb book [that] provides most of the essential ingredients for a judgment, including some new materials and scores of ingenious perceptions." It won a PEN award for history in 1976.

In addition to serving as associate editor of the Franklin Papers Project, Lopez was a senior research scholar in the Department of History. She appeared as a guest speaker on a variety of television talk shows, including the PBS Think Tank, and Was Benjamin Franklin the First American?, which aired 29 May 2003.

In 2002, Lopez was the adviser to the PBS mini-series, Benjamin Franklin, directed by Ellen Hovde and Muffie Meyer. It won a Primetime Emmy Award.

She was also a co-founder of the Friends of Franklin, devoted to the study and preservation of his works. She participated in the Creativity Foundation, established in 2000 in honor of Franklin.

== Works ==
- 1966/1990: Mon Cher Papa: Franklin and the Ladies of Paris
- 1975/1985: The Private Franklin: The Man and His Family, in collaboration with Eugenia Herbert
- 1990: Le Sceptre et la Foudre: Franklin à Paris (1776-1785), in French, published by Mercure de France
- 1997: Liberty! The American Revolution, appearing as herself providing the historical narrative surrounding Doctor Benjamin Franklin
- 2000: My Life with Benjamin Franklin, collected essays about her work and his life
- 2005: Temple's Diary: A Tale of Benjamin Franklin's Family in the days leading up to the American Revolution. (fictional diary of the young William Temple Franklin, grandson of Benjamin Franklin), written as a website production for the Independence Hall Association's website, ushistory.org.

== Legacy and honors ==
- 1976, Laurence L. & Thomas Winship/PEN New England Award for The Private Franklin.

== Death ==
Lopez died December 28, 2012, at the age of 92 at her New Haven, Connecticut, home of Alzheimer's disease.
