= Lucien Musset =

French historian

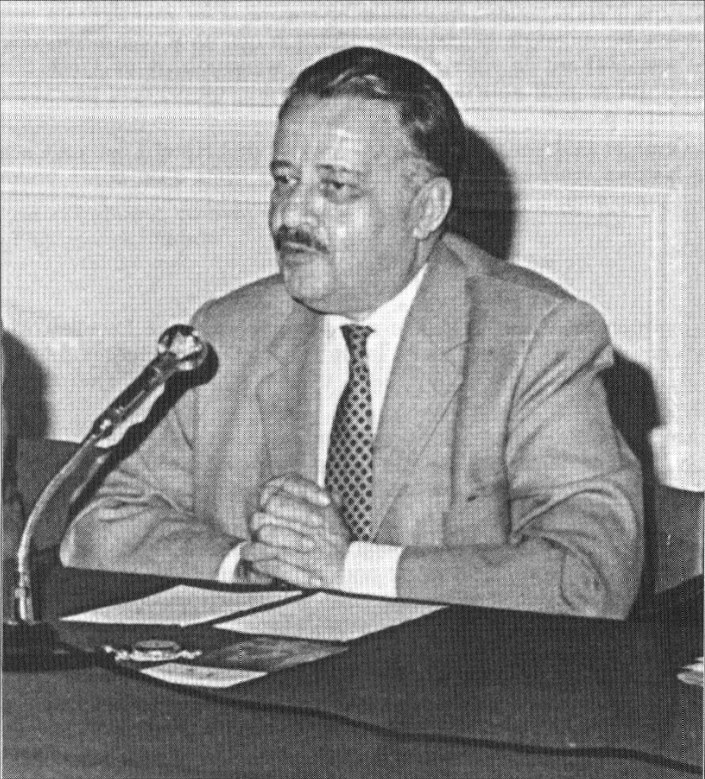
- Born: 26 August 1922; Rennes, France
- Died: 15 December 2004 (aged 82); Caen France
- Known for: Pioneering research on Germanic peoples, Vikings and Normans
- Scientific career
- Fields: History
- Institutions: University of Caen

Lucien Musset (26 August 1922 – 15 December 2004) was a French historian, specializing in the Duchy of Normandy and the history of the Vikings.

== Biography ==
Born in Rennes, Musset served as a professor of history at the University of Caen.

== Selected works ==
Musset's major works include:

- Les Peuples scandinaves au Moyen Âge (Scandinavian Peoples in the Middle Ages), Presses universitaires de France, Paris, 1951, 352 p.
- Les Invasions : les vagues germaniques (Invasions: The Germanic Waves), Presses universitaires de France, Paris, 1965
- Les Invasions; le second assaut contre l’Europe chrétienne VII^{e−}XI siècles (Invasions: The Second Assault Against Christian Europe, 7th – 11th Centuries), Presses universitaires de France, Paris, 1965
- Nordica et normannica : recueil d’études sur la Scandinavie ancienne et médiévale, les expéditions des Vikings et la fondation de la Normandie (Nordica and Normannica: collection of essays on ancient and medieval Scandinavia, the Viking expeditions and the founding of Normandy), Société des études nordiques, Paris, 1997
- "Naissance de la Normandie" ("Birth of Normandy"), in Michel de Boüard (editor), Histoire de la Normandie, Privat, Toulouse, 1970, p. 75-129 (ISBN 2-7089-1707-2)

== See also ==
- Georges Dumézil
- Claude Lecouteux
- François-Xavier Dillmann
