= Battle of Bolia =

Battle between Romans and Germans (468)

- Part of the Fall of the Roman Empire and Roman–Germanic Wars
Date	468
Location	Pannonia
Result	Ostrogothic victory

Belligerents
Ostrogoths	Gepids; Heruli; Rugii; Sarmatians; Sciri; Suebi; Supported by: Western Roman Empire

Commanders and leaders
Theodemir	Hunimund; Edeko; Onoulphus; Alaric; Babai; Beuca

The Battle of Bolia took place in 468 between the Ostrogoths led by the Amal dynasty and a coalition of other former allies of Attila. It took place in or near the Roman province of Pannonia. It was fought on the south side of the Danube near its confluence with the river Bolia, in present-day Hungary. The Ostrogoths won, achieving supremacy in Pannonia, but soon migrated south towards richer lands.

== Background ==
Following the death of Attila, various Germanic and other tribes sought their independence from his empire. They allied under the command of Ardaric, the Gepid king, and defeated the Huns and supporting forces at the Battle of Nedao in 454 CE. While the role of the Ostrogoths in that battle is unclear, it resulted in their independence as well. After the Battle of Nedao, the newly freed tribes jockeyed for supremacy in Pannonia for the next fifteen years, most eventually becoming federates of the Eastern Roman Empire.

== Battle ==
The Amal Goths were led by Theodemir, brother-in-law to the Ostrogoths' chief Valamir, who had been killed prior to the battle. The coalition included the Suevi under Hunimund, the Sciri under Hunulphus and Edicon (Edeko, Edica, Edika), the Sarmatians, the Gepids, the Rugians, and likely included the Heruli. The Roman Emperor Leo I supported the anti-Goth coalition, despite the advice of his general Aspar. Despite Valamir's death, the Ostrogoths won, and the battle marked the end of the Sciri as a separate people.

== Location ==
While some authors have simply stated that the Bolia River remains unidentified, the historian Ludwig Schmidt attempted in 1934 to identify the Bolia with the Ipeľ, and this identification continued to be followed by Wolfram, and several other modern authors, without further analysis. However, as Émilienne pointed out, such an identification would not place the battle in Pannonia. In order to fix that, Wolfram then suggested that the battle was across the Danube from the mouth of the Ipeľ at 47°47′N 18°53′E, which would have placed it near what is now the village of Pilismarót, in present-day Hungary; however, that area is not a plain. As the battle is described as occurring in Pannonia on a plain, some authors place it some sixty-five kilometers further west on the eastern side of the Little Hungarian Plain, which would make the Bolia River the Concó River, and place the battle near present-day Csém at 47°41′N 18°03′E.
