= Robert S. Lopez =

Italian-American historian

- Born: Roberto Sabatino Lopez; October 8, 1910; Genoa, Italy
- Died: July 6, 1986 (aged 75)
- Education: University of Milan
- Occupation: Medievalist

Robert Sabatino Lopez (born Roberto Sabatino Lopez; October 8, 1910 – July 6, 1986) was an Italian-born American historian of medieval European economic history. He taught for many years at Yale University as a Sterling Professor of History.

== Early life and education ==
Roberto Sabatino Lopez was born in Genoa, Italy. His family were Sephardi Jews. He graduated from the University of Milan in 1932 and taught medieval history at various universities, serving at one point as Chair of History at the University of Genoa. Lopez fled Benito Mussolini's regime for England in 1939, where he came under the influence of Cecil Roth. Robert L. Reynolds, a friend of Lopez, informed him that an American Ph.D. was necessary to find tenure at an American university, and through the influence of Reynolds, Lopez enrolled in the graduate history program at the University of Wisconsin-Madison. Here he gained a Ph.D. in 1942.

== Early work in the United States ==
From 1942 to 1944 Lopez worked for Voice of America and in the Italian section of the Office of War Information in New York City. There he met his future wife, Claude-Anne Kirschen, a wartime refugee from Belgium who had come to New York with her family in 1940. He afterward maintained that his successful courtship of her was his supreme wartime accomplishment.

== Marriage and family ==
Lopez married Claude-Anne Kirschen, a Jewish refugee from Belgium, in 1946. They had two sons, Michael and Lawrence, after moving to New Haven, Connecticut. The children were raised in the Jewish faith.

== Academic career ==
In 1946, Lopez was hired as an assistant professor at Yale University. He rose through the academic ranks to full professor. He was honored by selection as a Sterling Professor of History, a recognition of his academic contributions. Lopez was one of the first Jews appointed at Yale University.

At Yale, in 1962 Lopez founded the interdisciplinary graduate program in Medieval Studies, and served as its chairman for many years. Originally a master's program, it awarded doctorates by 1965. When founded, it was the third such medieval studies program in the United States.

Lopez trained a number of distinguished medieval scholars, among them David Herlihy, Edward M. Peters, and Patrick J. Geary. Lopez retired from the Yale faculty in 1981 after 35 years at the university.

Lopez's main contributions to the field were in the history of trade and commerce in the medieval Mediterranean. He was particularly interested in showing the dynamism and creativity of medieval towns and economic networks. Other scholars had frequently compared them unfavorably to those of the Renaissance and early modern period.

In his best-known book, The Commercial Revolution of the Middle Ages, 950–1350 (1971, with many reprints), Lopez argued that the key contribution of the medieval period to European history was the creation of a commercial economy. He said it was first based in the Italo-Byzantine eastern Mediterranean, but eventually extended to the Italian city-states and through the rest of Europe. Lopez said that it was the Renaissance period that was characterized by economic decline. Lopez's scholarship was underpinned by his expert knowledge of medieval agriculture, industry and especially coinage.

At the end of his career, Lopez maintained close ties to Israeli academia. He was affiliated with the Israel Institute for Advanced Studies and the Hebrew University of Jerusalem, and his advice was sought on the tenure cases of Israeli medievalists.

Lopez died from cancer in 1986. His library and papers were acquired by Arizona State University.

== Books ==
- Medieval Trade in the Mediterranean World (edited with Irving W. Raymond) (1955; 2nd ed. 1969)
- The Tenth Century: How Dark the Dark Ages? (1959)
- The Birth of Europe (1966)
- The Three Ages of the Italian Renaissance (1970)
- The Commercial Revolution of the Middle Ages (1971)
- Byzantium and the World around It: Economic and Institutional Relations (1978)
- The Shape of Medieval Monetary History (1986)

== Sources ==
- Mell, Julie (June 27, 2012). "Twentieth-Century Jewish Émigrés and Medieval European Economic History". Religions. 3 (3). Routledge: 556–587. doi:10.3390/rel3030556.
