= Heracleides of Ephesus =

Sculptor

Heracleides (Ancient Greek: Ἡρακλείδης) was a sculptor of Ephesus, and the son of Agasias. His name is inscribed, with that of Harmatius, on the restored statue of Ares in the Louvre in Paris. It cannot be said with certainty whether his father, Agasias, was the celebrated Ephesian sculptor of that name, but it seems probable that he was.
