= Robert L. Reynolds =

American historian (1902–1966)

- Born: Robert Leonard Reynolds; January 17, 1902; Janesville, Wisconsin, U.S.
- Died: April 29, 1966 (aged 64); Madison, Wisconsin, U.S.
- Education: University of Wisconsin University of Milwaukee
- Spouse: Sarah Brown Chickering (m. 1965, died)
- Children: 3
- Scientific career
- Fields: History
- Workplaces: Ghent University; University of Wisconsin

Robert Leonard Reynolds (January 17, 1902 − April 29, 1966) was an American historian.

== Biography ==
Robert Leonard Reynolds was born in Janesville, Wisconsin, on January 17, 1902. He attended elementary and high school in Milwaukee. Reynolds studied at the University of Wisconsin, where he received his B.A. in 1923 and his M.A. in 1925. After gaining his M.A. Reynolds briefly studied in Paris, and then returned to Milwaukee to work as a real estate salesman. He gained his Ph.D. from the University of Milwaukee in 1928. In 1929 Reynolds returned to Europe conduct post-graduate research. Here he worked at Ghent University and became a member of the U.S. Relief Commission.

By 1931, Reynolds had returned to the United States, where he was appointed an assistant professor of medieval and economic history at the University of Wisconsin. Since 1938 he was a full professor at the University of Wisconsin. When visiting Genoa in 1938, Reynolds established a life-long friendship with the Italian historian Robert Sabatino Lopez, with whom he would later write a seven volume history of Italy.

Reynolds was a member of the Alien Enemies Hearing Board in 1941. He joined the Office of Strategic Services (OSS) in 1942. During World War II, Reynolds served both in Washington, D.C., and in London. He earned a certificate of merit from Dwight D. Eisenhower on behalf of the Supreme Headquarters Allied Expeditionary Force.

After World War II, Reynolds returned to academia. In 1948 he helped form the University of Wisconsin's Integrated Liberal Studies program. From 1950 to 1951 he did research in the Genoese National Archives as a Fulbright fellow.

Reynolds was the author of numerous books and scholarly articles on the economic history of the Middle Ages.

He was a member of the Chi Phi fraternity, the American Historical Association, the Economic History Association, Medieval Academy of America, the Italian National Academy, the Belgian Historical Studies Society, and an honorary member of the Ligurian and Pavian Historical Society. In 1952, Reynolds served as vice-president of the Economic History Association.

Reynolds was an active member of the Democratic Party of Wisconsin. He also served in the Wisconsin Civil Liberties Union.

Reynolds was married to Sarah Brown Chickering, with whom he had two sons and a daughter. He died in Madison, Wisconsin, after a long illness on April 29, 1966. He was survived by his two sons.
