= Hunimund =

5th-century Suevian king

Hunimund (395 – after 469) was a leader – variously described by Jordanes as dux and as rex – of a group of Suebi.

The Suevi fought on the side of Ardaric, king of the Gepids, against the Huns and Ostrogoths at the Battle of Nedao in 454. Afterwards Hunimund ruled their small and short-lived kingdom somewhere near the old settlement area of the Marcomanni and the Quadi.

Jordanes reported that Hunimund led a Suebi raiding party that stole herds of Goth-owned cattle from Dalmatia; on their way home, near Lake Balaton, they were attacked while they slept by Theodemir's men. Hunimund and others surrendered and were taken prisoner. However, Theodemir adopted Hunimund as his son and released him and his men. Forgetting his duty to his "father", Hunimund and his Sciri again waged war against the Goths; Valamir attacked them, and was killed when he fell off his horse. With another Scirian rex, an otherwise-unknown Alaric, he then united with Sarmatians and other tribes to invade Pannonia, where they were defeated by Theodemir in a bloody battle.

In 469, Hunimund and allied Sciri fought the Ostrogoths of Valamir and Theodemir at the Battle of Bolia. The Ostrogoths won, and gained control of territory of the Sciri and Quadi.

"Hunimund, accompanied by a few barbarians, attacked the town of Batavis, as the saint had foretold, and, while almost all the inhabitants were occupied in the harvest, put to death forty men of the town who had remained for a guard."
