= Claude Lecouteux =

French philologist (1943–2025)

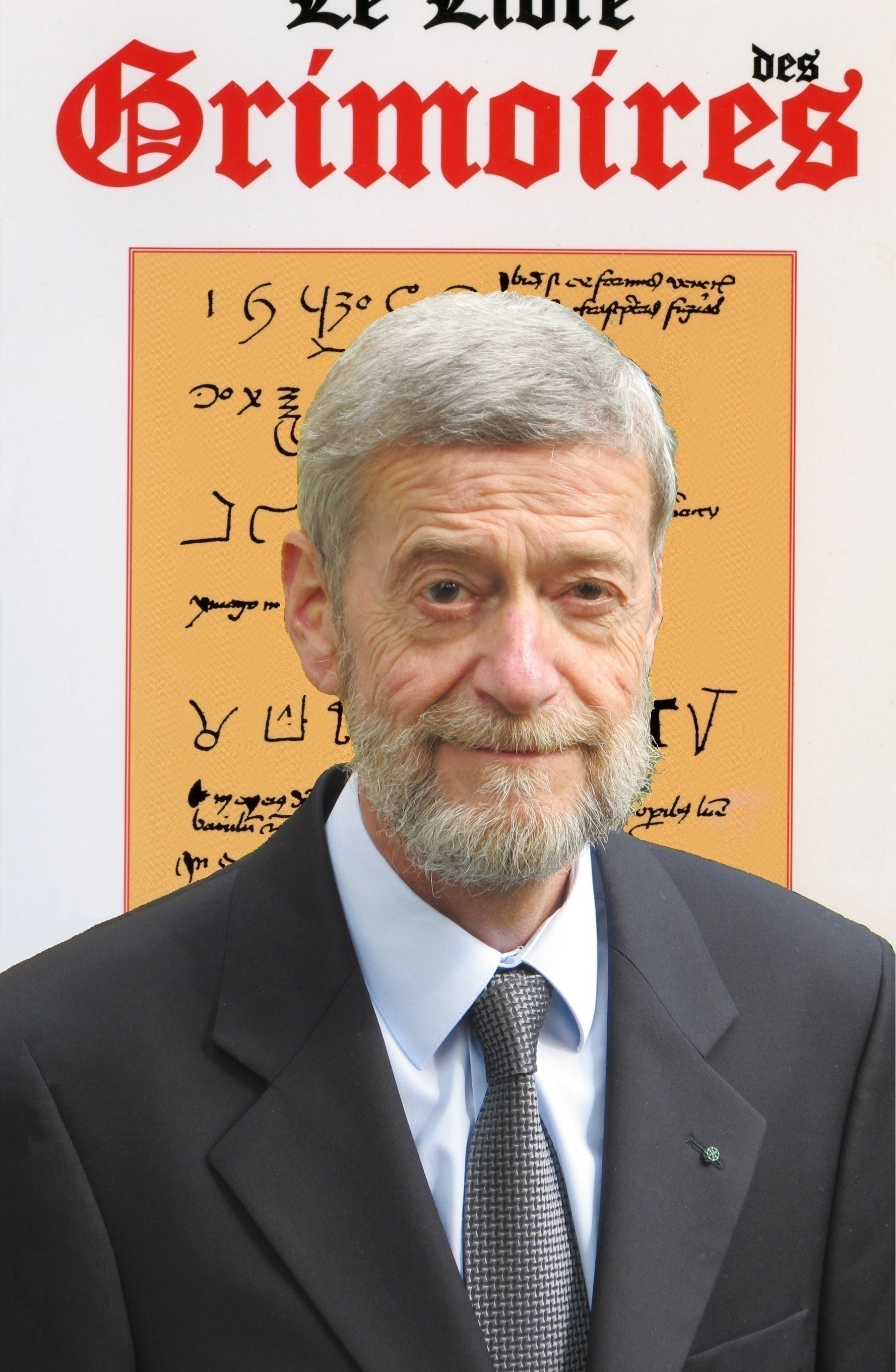
- Born: 8 February 1943
- Died: 13 November 2025 (aged 82)
- Awards: Knight of the Ordre des Palmes académiques (1996); Officer of the Ordre des Arts et des Lettres (2006)

Academic background
- Education: Sorbonne University; Blaise Pascal University
- Doctoral advisor: Gaston Zink
- Influences: Georges Dumézil

Academic work
- Discipline: Germanic studies
- Institutions: Sorbonne University
- Main interests: Germanic mythology and folklore
- Notable works: Encyclopedia of Norse and Germanic Folklore, Mythology, and Magic (2015)

Claude Lecouteux (8 February 1943 – 13 November 2025) was a French philologist and medievalist who specialised in Germanic studies. He was Professor Emeritus and Chair of the Literature and Civilization of Medieval Germanic Peoples at Sorbonne University.

In 1986 Lecouteux published what is now regarded as a seminal history of ghosts from 500 to 1500, relying largely on literary sources.

== Life and career ==
Claude Lecouteux received a PhD in Germanic studies from Sorbonne University in 1975, and a DA from the Blaise Pascal University in 1980. From 1981 to 1992, Lecouteux was Professor and Chair of the Languages, Literatures and Civilizations of Germanic Peoples at the University of Caen Normandy. From 1992 to 2007, Lecouteux was Professor and Chair of Medieval Germanic Literature at Sorbonne University. Since 2007, Lecouteux has been Professor Emeritus and Chair of the Literature and Civilization of Medieval Germanic Peoples at Sorbonne University.

Lecouteux was made a Knight of the Ordre des Palmes académiques in 1996, and an Officer of the Ordre des Arts et des Lettres in 2006. He died on 13 November 2025, at the age of 82.

== Select bibliography ==
- The Melusinian Motiv in German mediaeval Literature (doctoral thesis, 1980)

=== Books ===
Title	Year	Publisher	Translator
Witches, Werewolves and Fairies: Shapeshifters and Astral Doubles in the Middle Ages (Fées, Sorcières et Loups-garous)	1992 (Fr), 2003 (En)	Éditions Imago (Paris), Inner Traditions (Rochester, Vermont)	Clare Frock
The Return of the Dead: Ghosts, Ancestors and the Transparent Veil of the Pagan Mind (Fantômes et Revenants au Moyen Age)	1996 (Fr), 2009 (En)	Éditions Imago (Paris), Inner Traditions (Rochester, Vermont)	Jon E. Graham
The Secret History of Vampires: Their Multiple Forms and Hidden Purposes (Histoire de Vampires: Autopsie d'un mythe)	1999 (Fr), 2010 (En)	Éditions Imago (Paris), Inner Traditions (Rochester, Vermont)	Jon E. Graham
Phantom Armies of the Night: The Wild Hunt and Ghostly Processions of the Undead (Chasses fantastiques et cohorts de la nuit au moyen age)	1999 (Fr), 2011 (En)	Éditions Imago (Paris), Inner Traditions (Rochester, Vermont)	Jon E. Graham
The Secret History of Poltergeists and Haunted Houses: From Pagan Folklore to Modern Manifestations	2012 (En)	Inner Traditions (Rochester, Vermont)	Jon E. Graham
A Lapidary of Sacred Stones. Their Magical and Medicinal Powers Based on the Earliest Sources	2012 (En)	Inner Traditions (Rochester, Vermont)	Jon E. Graham
The Tradition of Household Spirits. Ancestral Lore and Practice (La maison et ses génies: Croyances d'hier et d'aujourd'hui)	2000 (Fr), 2013 (En)	Éditions Imago (Paris), Inner Traditions (Rochester, Vermont)	Jon E. Graham
The Tradition of Household Spirits. Ancestral Lore and Practice	2013 (En)	Inner Traditions (Rochester, Vermont)	Jon E. Graham
Book Of Grimoires: The Secret Grammar of Magic	2013 (En)	Inner Traditions (Rochester, Vermont)	Jon E. Graham
The High Magic Of Talismans & Amulets: Tradition and Craft	2014 (En)	Inner Traditions (Rochester, Vermont)	Jon E. Graham
Demons and Spirits of the Land: Ancestral Lore and Practices	2015 (En)	Inner Traditions (Rochester, Vermont)	Jon E. Graham
Dictionary of Ancient Magic Words and Spells: From Abraxas to Zoar	2015 (En)	Inner Traditions (Rochester, Vermont)	Jon E. Graham
Encyclopedia of Norse and Germanic Folklore, Mythology, and Magic	2015 (En)	Inner Traditions (Rochester, Vermont)	Jon E. Graham
King Solomon the Magus: Master of the Djinns and Occult Traditions of East and West	2022 (En)	Inner Traditions (Rochester, Vermont)	Jon E. Graham

== See also ==
- Rudolf Simek
- John Lindow

== Sources ==
- Interview with Claude Lecouteux
- maison-hantee.com
- US publishers page
