= Theodosian dynasty =

Roman imperial dynasty in Late Antiquity, r. 379–457

Roman imperial dynasties Theodosian dynasty
- 379–457
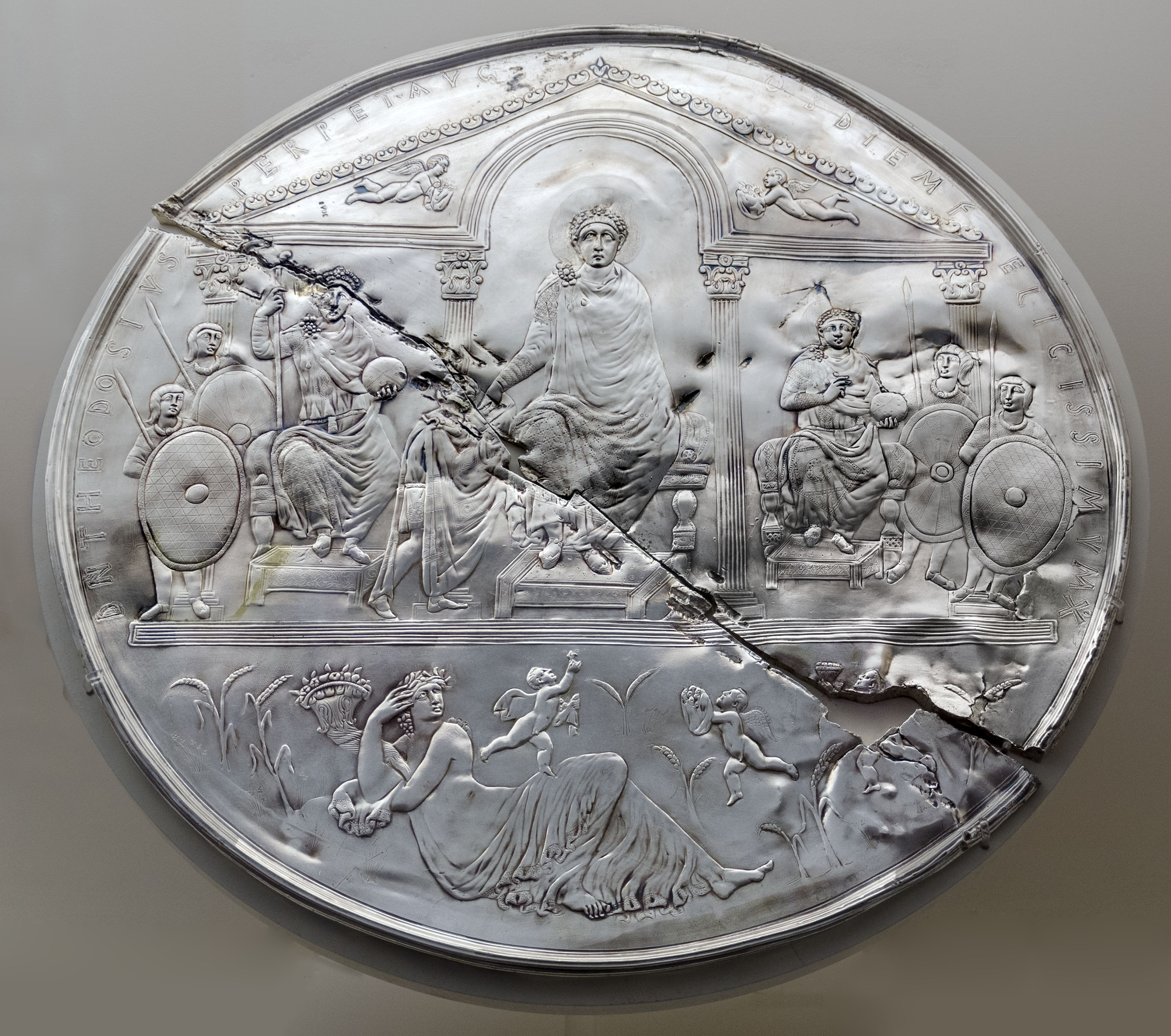
- Missorium of Theodosius with three Theodosian emperors (Note: Probably Theodosius the Great and his sons Arcadius and Honorius)

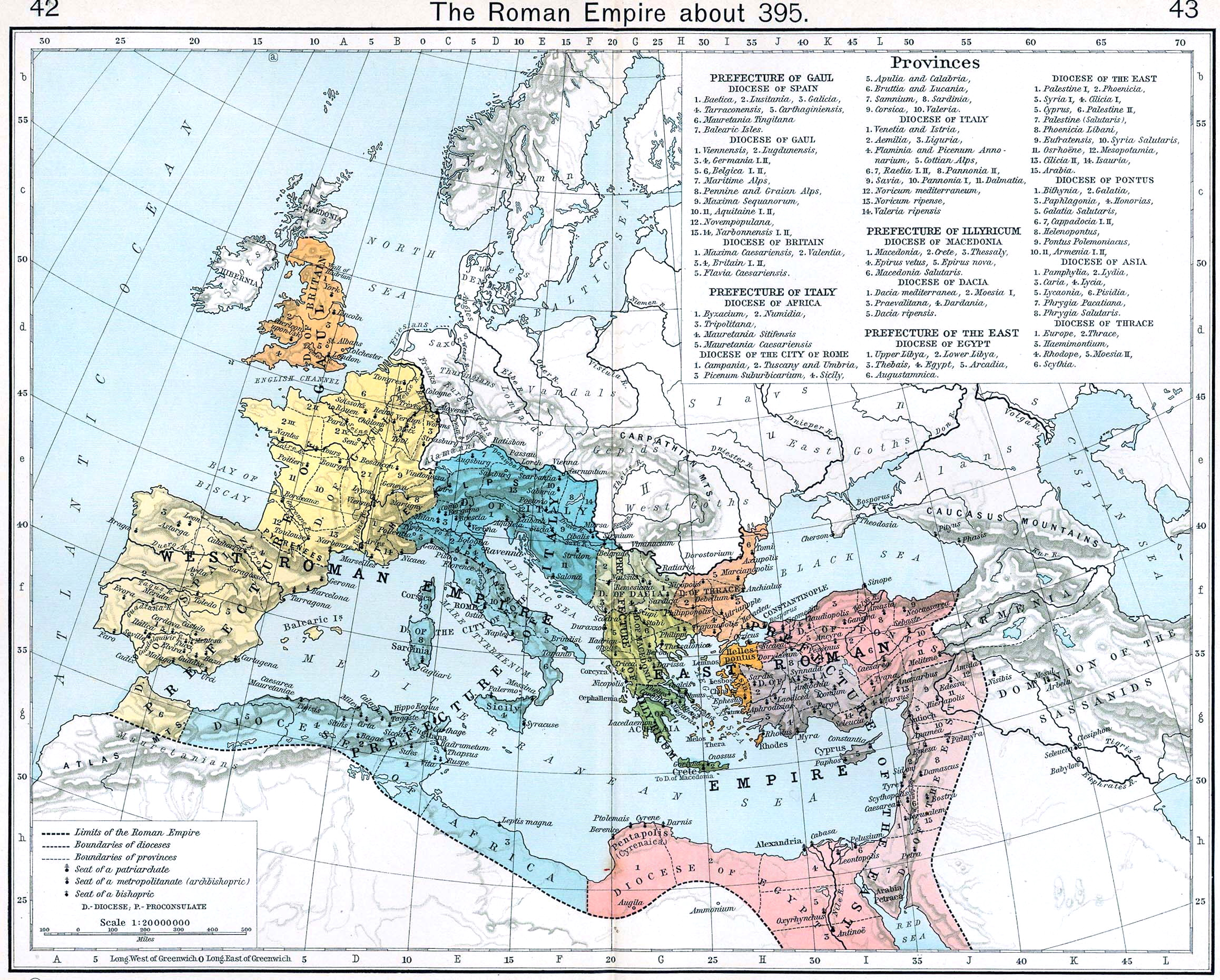
- Western and Eastern Roman Empires 395
- Status: Imperial dynasty
- Capital: Rome; Constantinople; Ravenna
- Government: Absolute monarchy
- Western Roman emperor
  - 394–395: Theodosius I
  - 395–423: Honorius
  - 421: Constantius III
  - 425–455: Valentinian III
  - 467–472: Anthemius
- Eastern Roman emperor
  - 379–395: Theodosius I
  - 395–408: Arcadius
  - 408–450: Theodosius II
  - 450–457: Marcian
- Historical era: Late antiquity
  - Battle of Adrianople, Death of Valens (378), Ascent of Theodosius I: 379
  - Death of Marcian: 457
Preceded by	Succeeded by
Valentinianic dynasty (364–455)	Leonid dynasty (457–518)

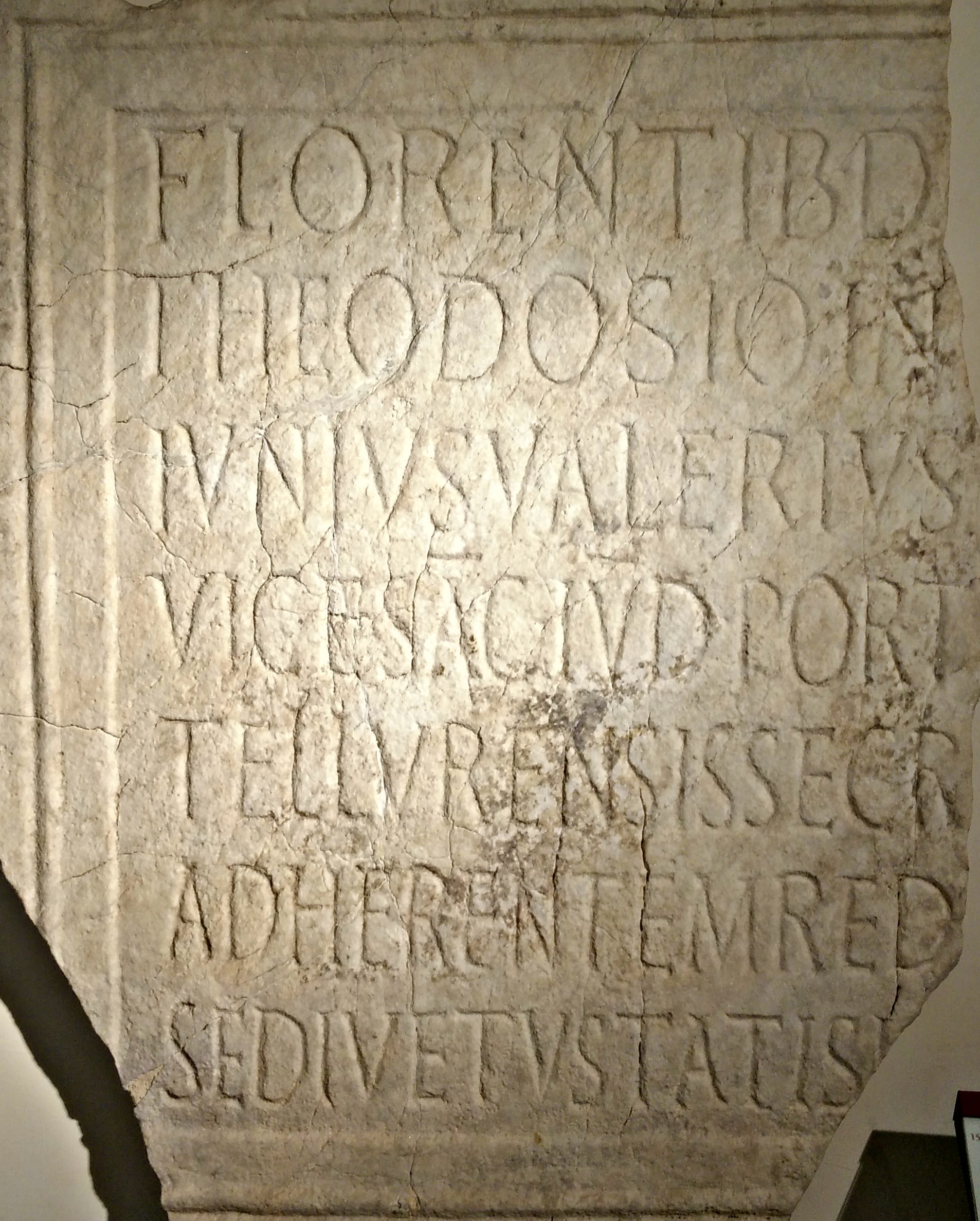
Inscription in honour of Theodosius and Honorius (Note: Inscription reads: Florentib· d·d· [n·n· H]onorio [et] Theodosio inc[lyti]s semper augg· Iunius Valerius [Bellici]us v·c· p[r]aef· u[rb·] vice sac·iud port[icum cum sc]r[i]ni[is] Tellurensis secr[etarii tribunalibus] adherentem red[integravit et] urbanae sedi vetustatis h[o]nor[em resti]tuit)

The Theodosian dynasty was a Roman imperial family that produced five Roman emperors during Late Antiquity, reigning over the Roman Empire from 379 to 457. The dynasty's patriarch was Theodosius the Elder, whose son Theodosius the Great was made Roman emperor in 379. Theodosius's two sons both became emperors, while his daughter married Constantius III, producing a daughter that became an empress and a son also became emperor. The dynasty of Theodosius married into, and reigned concurrently with, the ruling Valentinianic dynasty (r. 364–455), and was succeeded by the Leonid dynasty (r. 457–518) with the accession of Leo the Great.

== History ==
Its founding father was Flavius Theodosius (often referred to as Count Theodosius), a great hispanic general who had saved Britannia from the Great Conspiracy. The future usurper and Western emperor, Magnus Maximus (r. 383–388), was born in his estates, and claimed to be his relative. However, this may not be true. His son, Flavius Theodosius was made emperor of the Eastern Roman Empire in 379, and briefly reunited the Roman Empire 394–395 by defeating the usurper Eugenius. Theodosius I was succeeded by his sons Honorius in the West and Arcadius in the East. The House of Theodosius was related to the Valentinianic Dynasty by marriage, since Theodosius I had married Galla, a daughter of Valentinian I. Their daughter was Galla Placidia. The last emperor in the West belonging to the dynasty was Galla Placidia's son Valentinian III. The last emperor of the dynasty in the East was Theodosius II, the son of Arcadius. Later, both in the East and in the West, the dynasty briefly continued, but only through marriages: Marcian became emperor by marrying Pulcheria, the older sister of Theodosius II, after the death of the latter, Petronius Maximus was married to Licinia Eudoxia, the daughter of Theodosius II, and Olybrius was married to Placidia, the daughter of Valentinian III. Anthemius is also sometimes counted to the dynasty as he became a son-in-law of Marcian. Descendants of the dynasty continued to be part of the East Roman nobility at Constantinople until the end of the 6th century.

According to Polemius Silvius, Theodosius the Great was born on 11 January 347 or 346. The epitome de Caesaribus places his birthplace at Cauca (Coca, Segovia) in Hispania. Theodosius had a brother named Honorius, a sister referred to in Aurelius Victor's De caesaribus but whose name is unknown, and a niece, Serena.

In 366, Theodosius the Elder attacked and defeated the Alamanni in Gaul; the defeated prisoners were resettled in the Po Valley. In 367 Roman Britain was threatened by the Great Conspiracy, defeated 368–369 by the magister equitum Theodosius the Elder, accompanied by his son Theodosius. At this time was the unsuccessful usurpation in Britain by Valentinus. Theodosius the Elder was made magister equitum in 369, and retained the post until 375. The magister equitum and his son Theodosius campaigned against the Alamanni 370. The two Theodosi campaigned against Sarmatians in 372/373. Valentinian's rule in Roman Africa was disrupted by the revolt of Firmus in 373. Theodosius the Elder defeated the usurpation.

In 373/374, Theodosius the magister equitum's son, was made dux of the province of Moesia Prima. At the fall of his father, Theodosius the dux of Moesia Prima retired to his estates in the Iberian Peninsula, where he married Aelia Flaccilla in 376. Their first child, Arcadius, was born around 377. Pulcheria, their daughter, was born in 377 or 378. Theodosius had returned to the Danube frontier by 378, when he was appointed magister equitum.

=== First generation emperor: Theodosius the Great ===
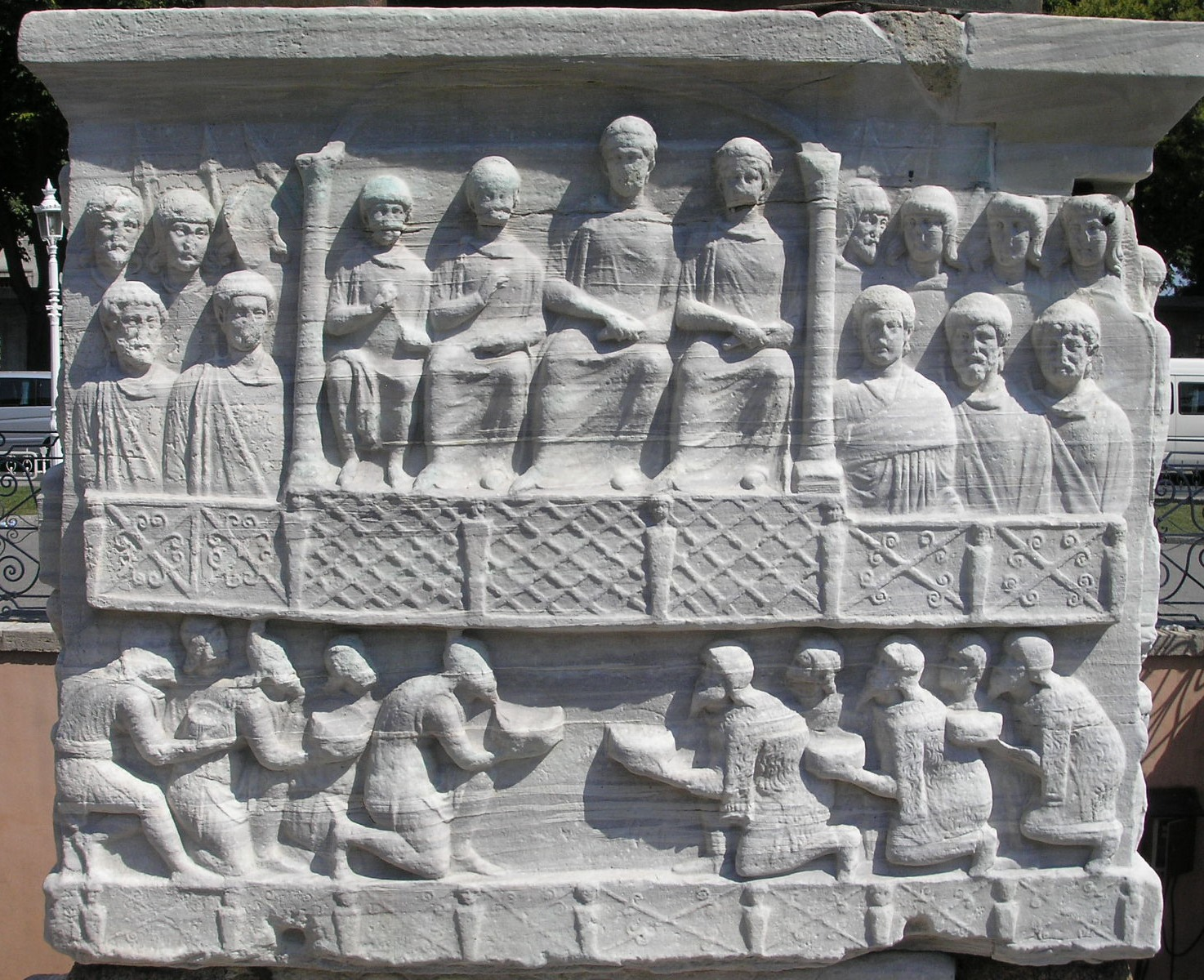
The Theodosians enthroned among their court, receiving tribute from barbarians performing proskynesis (relief on the pedestal of the Obelisk of Theodosius in the Hippodrome of Constantinople)

After the death of his uncle Valens (r. 364–378), Gratian, now the senior augustus, sought a candidate to nominate as Valens's successor. On 19 January 379, Theodosius I was made augustus over the eastern provinces at Sirmium. His wife, Aelia Flaccilla, was accordingly raised to augusta. The new augustus's territory spanned the Roman praetorian prefecture of the East, including the Roman diocese of Thrace, and the additional dioceses of Dacia and of Macedonia. Theodosius the Elder, who had died in 375, was then deified as: Divus Theodosius Pater, lit. 'the Divine Father Theodosius'. In October 379 the Council of Antioch was convened. On 27 February 380 Theodosius issued the Edict of Thessalonica, making Nicene Christianity the state church of the Roman Empire. In 380, Theodosius was made Roman consul for the first time and Gratian for the fifth; in September the augusti Gratian and Theodosius met, returning the Roman diocese of Dacia to Gratian's control and that of Macedonia to Valentinian II. In autumn Theodosius fell ill, and was baptized. According to the Consularia Constantinopolitana, Theodosius arrived at Constantinople and staged an adventus, a ritual entry to the capital, on 24 November 380.

Theodosius issued a decree against Christians deemed heretics on 10 January 381. According to the Consularia Constantinopolitana, on the 11 January, Athanaric, king of the Gothic Thervingi arrived in Constantinople; he died and was buried in Constantinople on 25 January. On 8 May 381, Theodosius issued an edict against Manichaeism. In mid-May, Theodosius convened the First Council of Constantinople, the second ecumenical council after Constantine's First Council of Nicaea in 325; the Constantinopolitan council ended on 9 July. According to Zosimus, Theodosius won a victory over the Carpi and the Sciri in summer 381. On 21 December, Theodosius decreed the prohibition of sacrifices with the intent of divining the future. On 21 February 382, the body of Theodosius's father in law Valentinian the Great was finally laid to rest in the Church of the Holy Apostles. Another Council of Constantinople was held in summer 382. According to the Consularia Constantinopolitana, a treaty of foedus was reached with the Goths, and they were settled between the Danube and the Balkan Mountains.

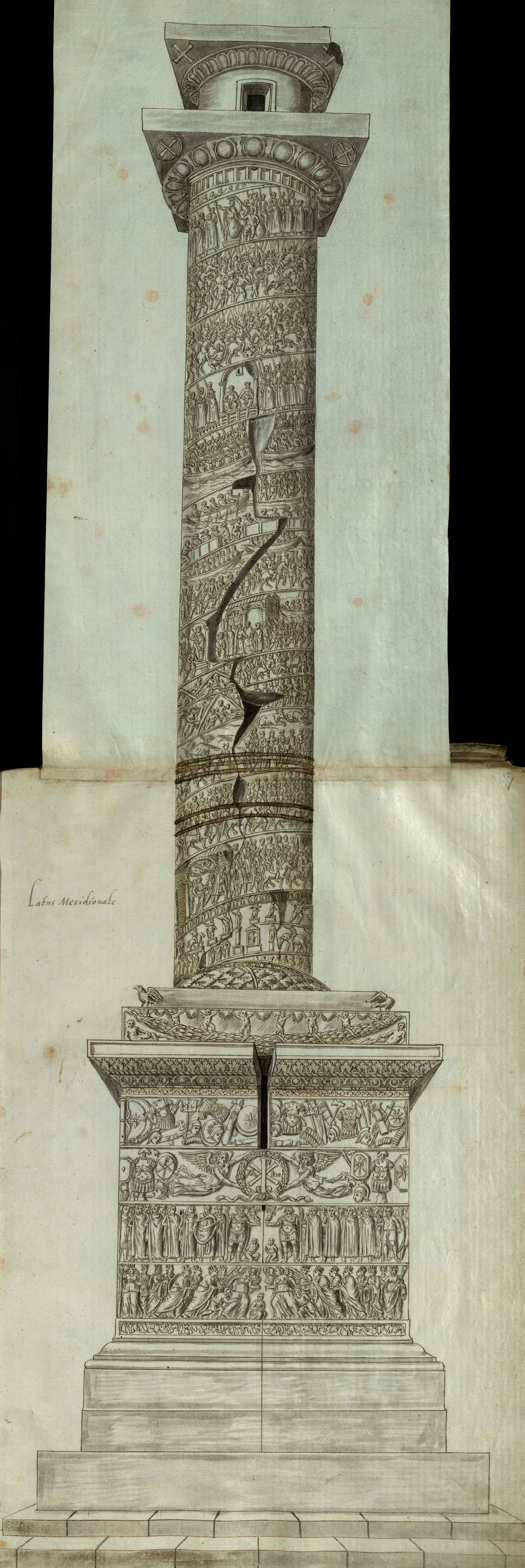
Drawing of the Column of Arcadius in Constantinople, possibly by Lambert de Vos, c. 1574 (Cambridge, Trinity College, ms. O.17.2)

According to the Chronicon Paschale, Theodosius celebrated his quinquennalia on 19 January at Constantinople; on this occasion he raised his eldest son Arcadius to co-augustus. Early 383 saw the acclamation of Magnus Maximus as augustus in Britain and the appointment of Themistius as praefectus urbi in Constantinople. On 25 July, Theodosius issued a new edict against gatherings of Christians deemed heretics. Sometime in 383, Gratian's wife Constantia died. Gratian remarried, wedding Laeta, whose father was a consularis of Roman Syria. On the 25 August 383, according to the Consularia Constantinopolitana, Gratian was killed at Lugdunum (Lyon) by Andragathius, the magister equitum of the rebel augustus during the rebellion of Magnus Maximus (r. 383–388). Constantia's body arrived in Constantinople on 12 September that year and was buried in the Church of the Holy Apostles on 1 December. Gratian was deified as Latin: Divus Gratianus, lit. 'the Divine Gratian'.

On 21 January 384 all those deemed heretics were expelled from Constantinople. According to the Consularia Constantinopolitana, Theodosius received in Constantinople an embassy from the Sasanian Empire in 384. In summer 384, Theodosius met his co-augustus Valentinian II in northern Italy. Theodosius brokered a peace agreement between Valentinian and Magnus Maximus which endured for several years.

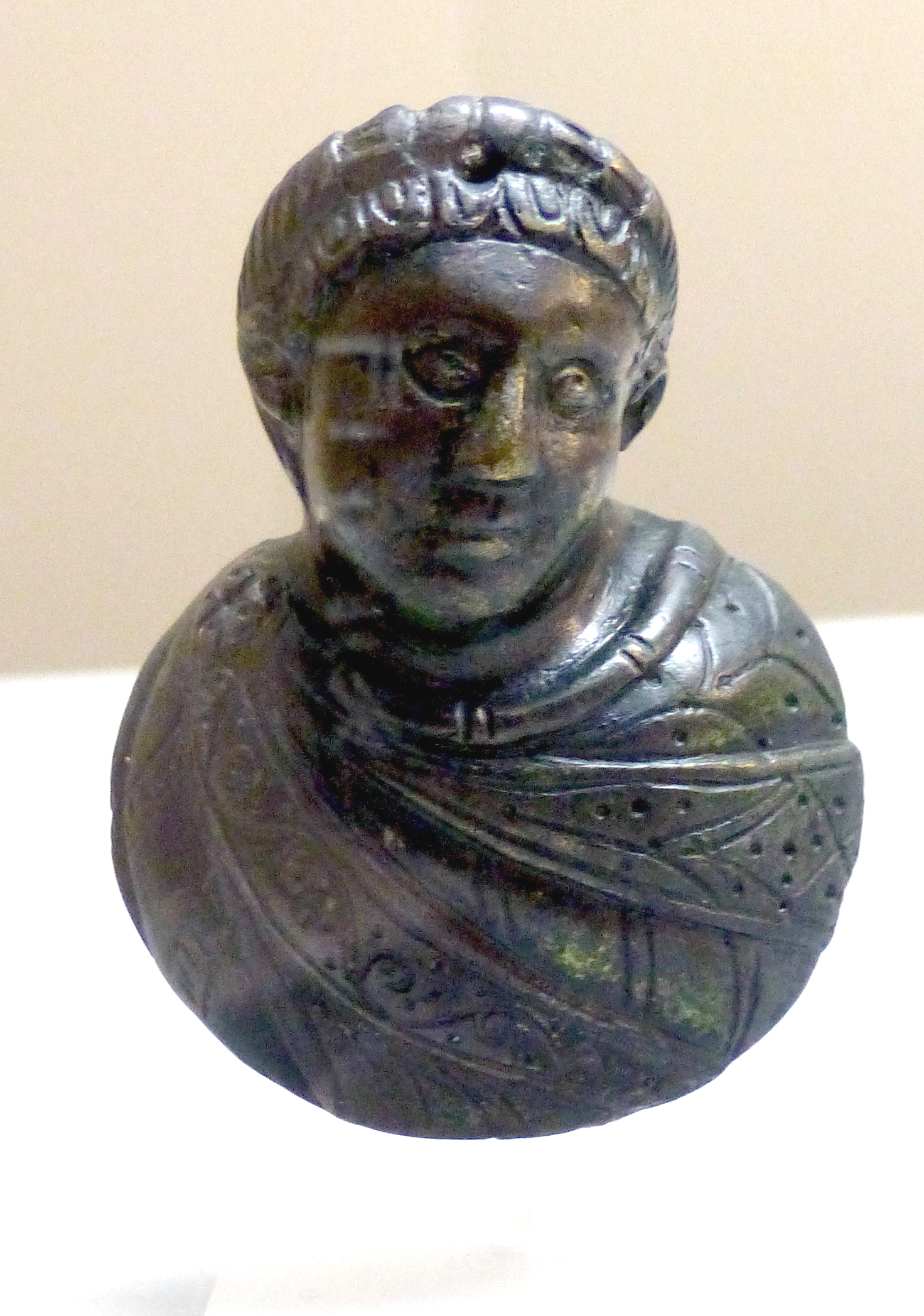
Bust of Honorius, Landesmuseum Burgenland, Eisenstadt

Theodosius's second son Honorius was born on 9 December 384 and titled nobilissimus puer (or nobilissimus iuvenis). Sometime before 386 died Aelia Flaccilla, Theodosius's first wife and the mother of Arcadius, Honorius, and Pulcheria. She died at Scotumis in Thrace and was buried at Constantinople, her funeral oration delivered by Gregory of Nyssa. A statue of her was dedicated in the Byzantine Senate. In 384 or 385, Theodosius's niece Serena was married to the magister militum, Stilicho. On 25 May 385, Theodosius reiterated the ban on sacrifices with questions concerning the future with new legislation. In the beginning of 386, Theodosius's first wife Aelia Flaccilla and his daughter Pulcheria both died. That summer the Goths were defeated, together with their settlement in Phrygia. According to the Consularia Constantinopolitana, a Roman triumph over the Gothic Greuthungi was then celebrated at Constantinople. The same year, work began on the great triumphal column in the Forum of Theodosius in Constantinople, the Column of Theodosius. On 19 January 387, according to the Consularia Constantinopolitana, Arcadius celebrated his quinquennalia in Constantinople. By the end of the month, there was an uprising or riot in Antioch, known as Riot of the Statues. Also in 387, Armenia was divided between Rome and Persia by the peace treaty known as Peace of Acilisene.

The peace with Magnus Maximus was broken in 387, and Valentinian escaped the west with Justina, reaching Thessalonica (Thessaloniki) in summer or autumn 387 and appealing to Theodosius for aid; Valentinian II's sister Galla was then married to the eastern augustus at Thessalonica in late autumn. Theodosius may still have been in Thessalonica when he celebrated his decennalia on 19 January 388. Theodosius was consul for the second time in 388. Galla and Theodosius's first child, a son named Gratian, was born in 388 or 389.

On 10 March 388, Christians deemed heretics were forbidden from residing in cities. On 14 March, Theodosius banned the intermarriage of Jews and Christians. In summer 388, Theodosius recovered Italy from Magnus Maximus for Valentinian, and in June, the meeting of Christians deemed heretics was banned by Valentinian. Around July, Magnus Maximus was defeated by Theodosius at Siscia (Sisak) and at Poetovio (Ptuj), and on 28 August, Magnus Maximus was executed by Theodosius. According to the Consularia Constantinopolitana, Arbogast killed Flavius Victor (r. 384–388), Magnus Maximus's young son and co-augustus, in Gaul in August/September that year. Damnatio memoriae was pronounced against them, and inscriptions naming them were erased.

Theodosius came into conflict with Ambrose, bishop of Mediolanum, in October 388 over the persecution of Jews at Callincium-on-the-Euphrates (Raqqa). As mentioned in the Panegyrici Latini and in a panegyric of Claudian's on the sixth consulship of Honorius, Theodosius then received another embassy from the Persians in 389. According to the Consularia Constantinopolitana, Theodosius staged an adventus on entering Rome on 13 June 389. On 17 June, he issued a decree against Manichaeism. Theodosius had left Valentinian under the protection of the magister militum Arbogast, who then defeated the Franks in 389.

In spring 390, possibly in April, the Massacre of Thessalonica was perpetrated by Theodosius's army, leading to a confrontation with Ambrose. Ambrose demanded that the emperor do penance for the massacre. According to the 5th-century church historian Theodoret, on 25 December 390 (Christmas), Ambrose received Theodosius back into the Christian Church in his bishopric of Mediolanum. According to the Chronicon Paschale, on 18 February 391, the head of John the Baptist was translated to Constantinople. On the 24 February, attendance at pagan sacrifices and temples was forbidden by law. In early summer 391, an uprising in Alexandria was suppressed, and the Serapeum of Alexandria was destroyed. On 16 June, pagan worship was prohibited by law. In 391, a delegation from the Roman Senate was snubbed in Gaul because of the reappearance of the Altar of Victory in the Curia Julia.

According to Zosimus, Theodosius then campaigned against marauding barbarian bandits in Macedonia in autumn 391. Eventually, he came to Constantinople, where according to Socrates Scholasticus's Historia Ecclesiastica he held an adventus, entering the city on 10 November 391.

On 15 May 392, Valentinian II died at Vienna in Gaul (Vienne), either by suicide or as part of a plot by Arbogast. He was deified with the consecratio: Divae Memoriae Valentinianus, lit. 'the Divine Memory of Valentinian'. Theodosius was then sole adult emperor, reigning with his son Arcadius. On 22 August at the behest of the magister militum Arbogast, a magister scrinii and vir clarissimus, Eugenius, was acclaimed augustus at Lugdunum (Lyon). On 8 November 392, all cult worship of the gods was forbidden by Theodosius.

According to Polemius Silvius, Theodosius raised his second son Honorius to augustus on 23 January 393. 393 was the year of Theodosius's third consulship. On 29 September 393, Theodosius issued a decree for the protection of Jews. According to Zosimus, at the end of April 394, Theodosius's wife Galla died. On 1 August, a colossal statue of Theodosius was dedicated in Constantinople's Forum of Theodosius, an event recorded in the Chronicon Paschale. According to Socrates Scholasticus, Theodosius defeated Eugenius at the Battle of the Frigidus on 6 September 394 and on 8 September, Arbogast killed himself. According to Socrates, on 1 January 395, Honorius arrived in Mediolanum and a victory celebration was held there.

According to the Consularia Constantinopolitana, Theodosius died in Mediolanum on 17 January 395. His funeral was held there on 25 February, and his body transferred to Constantinople, where according to the Chronicon Paschale he was buried on 8 November 395 in the Church of the Holy Apostles. He was deified as: Divus Theodosius, lit. 'the Divine Theodosius'.

Theodosian coins
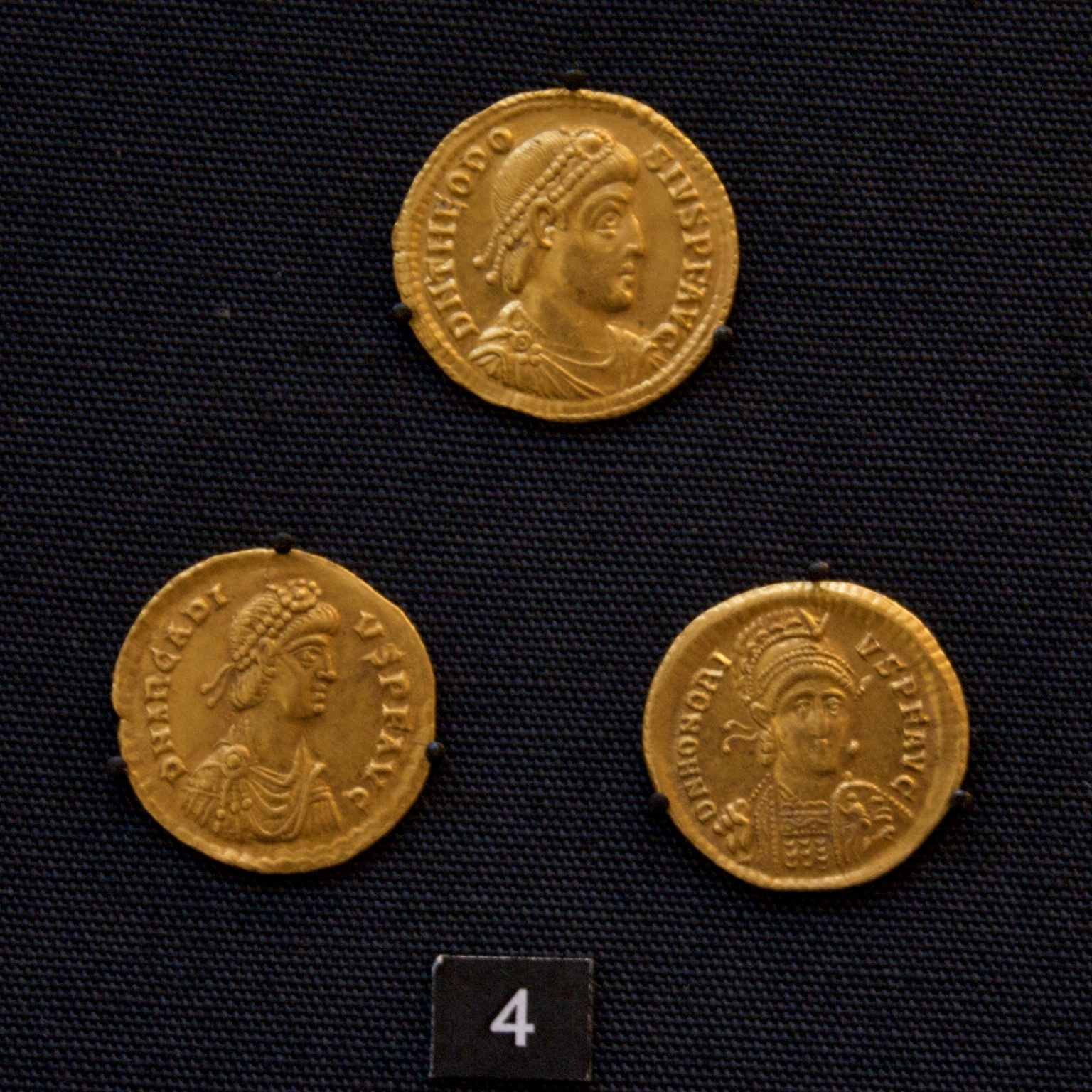
Solidi of Hoxne Hoard (Note: Theodosius I (top), Arcadius (left), and Honorius (right))

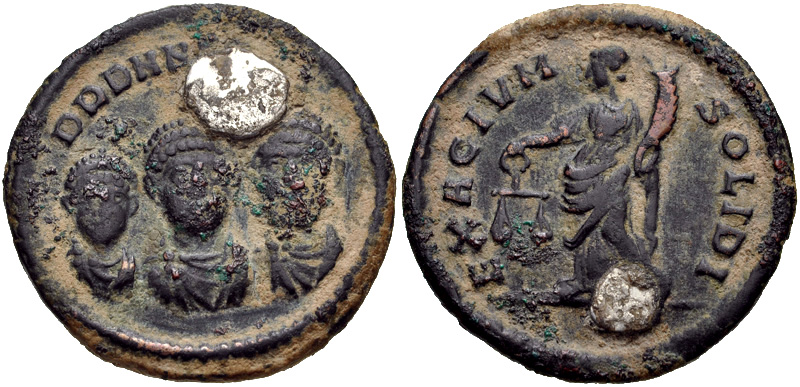
Exagium solidi (Note: d·d·d·n·n·n·auggg· ("Our Lords the Augusti") : Theodosius (centre), Arcadius (left), Honorius (right))

=== Second generation emperors: Arcadius and Honorius ===
The two surviving sons of Theodosius ruled the eastern and western halves of the empire after their father died. Theodosius's second wife Galla, the daughter of Valentinian the Great by his second wife Justina, was Galla Placidia, born in 392 or 393. Galla Placidia's brother Gratian, the son of Galla and Theodosius, died in 394. Another son, John (Latin: Ioannes), may have been born in 394. Galla Placidia married Athaulf, the King of the Visigoths in 414; he soon died and she married the patricius Constantius (later Constantius III) in 417. Their children were Justa Grata Honoria and Valentinian III. Constantius III was elevated to augustus in 421 by Honorius, who had no issue, and Galla Placidia was made augusta; Constantius died the same year and Galla Placidia fled to Constantinople.

Arcadius and Honorius coins
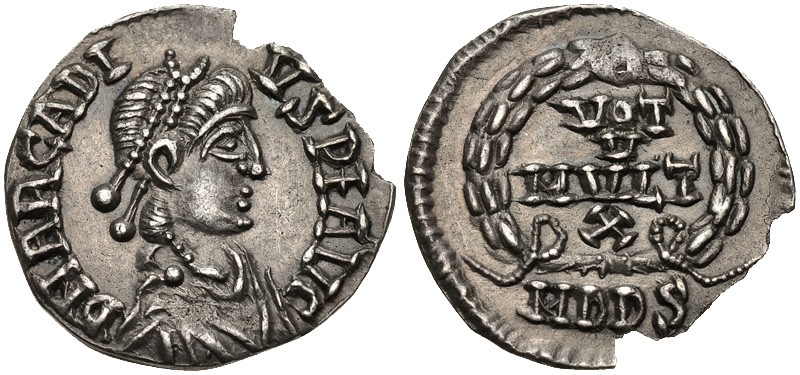
Siliqua of Arcadius after quinquennalia (Note: d·n· arcadius p·f· aug· ("Our Lord Arcadius, Pious Happy Augustus"))

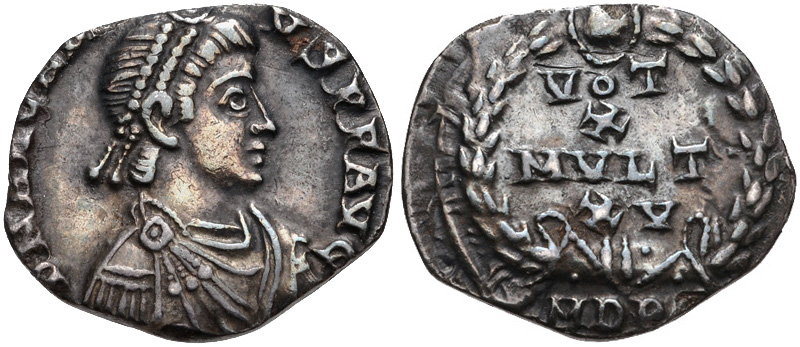
Siliqua of Arcadius after decennalia

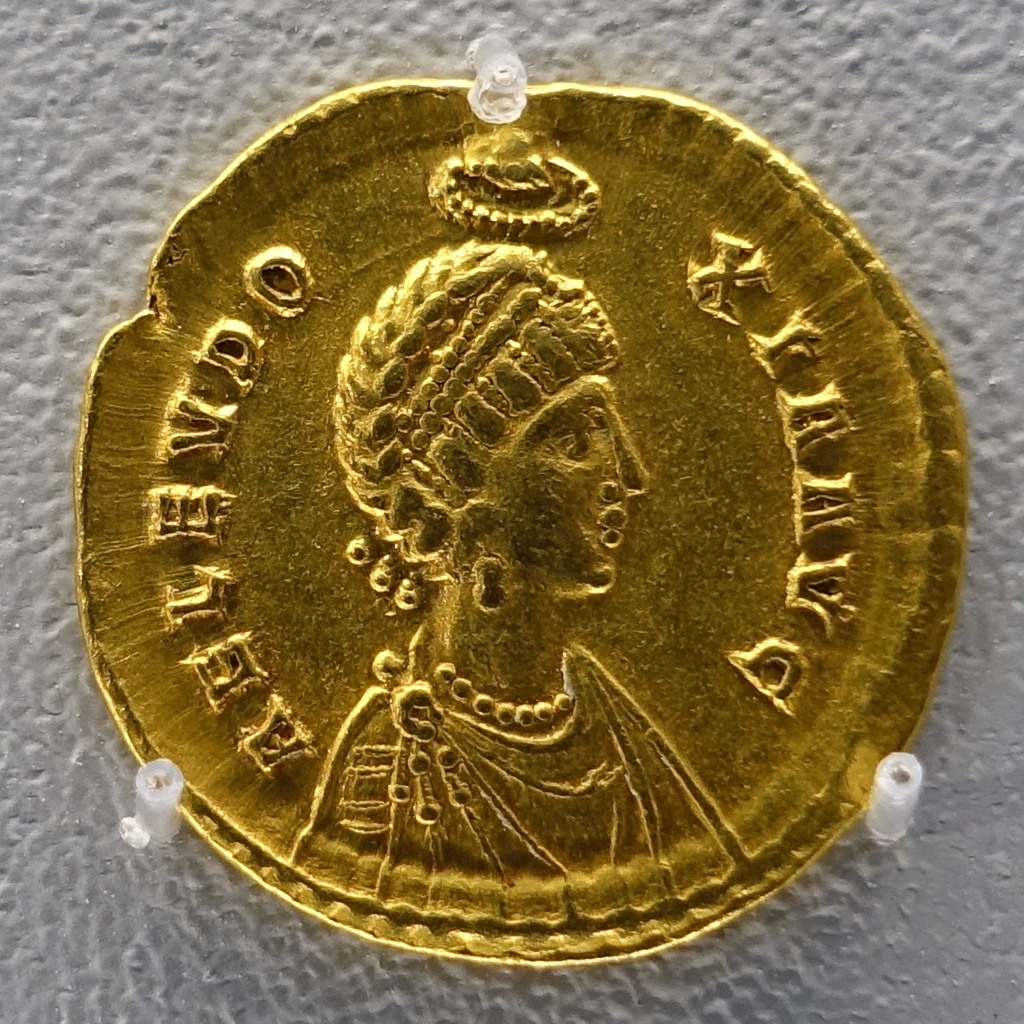
Solidus of Arcadius' wife Aelia Eudoxia crowned by the Manus Dei (hand of God) (Note: Inscription: ael· eudoxia aug· ("Aelia Eudocia Augusta"))

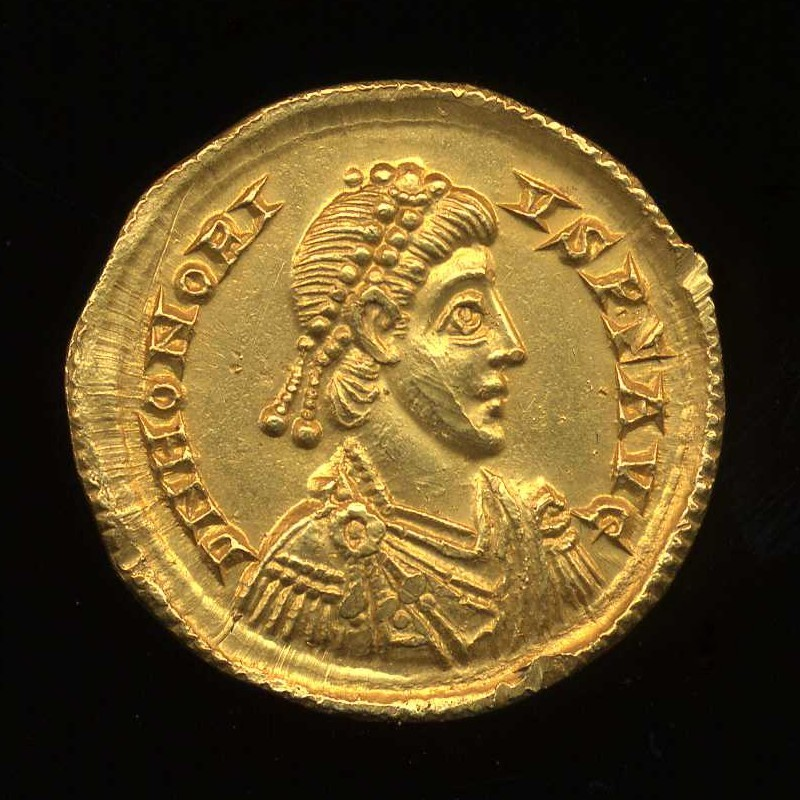
Solidus of Honorius (Note: Inscription: d·n· honorius p·f· aug· ("Our Lord Arcadius, Pious Happy Augustus"), from Hoxne hoard)

=== Third generation emperors: Theodosius II and Valentinian III ===
When Honorius died in 423, the primicerius notariorum Joannes (r. 423–425) succeeded as augustus in the west; thereafter Theodosius II (r. 402–450) – son and successor of Arcadius as augustus in the east – moved to install Galla Placidia's son Valentinian as emperor in the west instead, appointing him caesar on 23 October 424. After the fall of Joannes, Valentinian III was made augustus on the first anniversary of his investiture as caesar; he ruled the western provinces until his death on the 16 March 455, though Galla Placidia was regent during his youth. Galla Placidia died on 25 November 450.

Valentinian coins
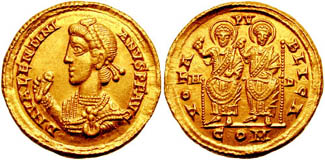
Solidus of Valentinian II with Theodosius I on the reverse, each holding a mappa

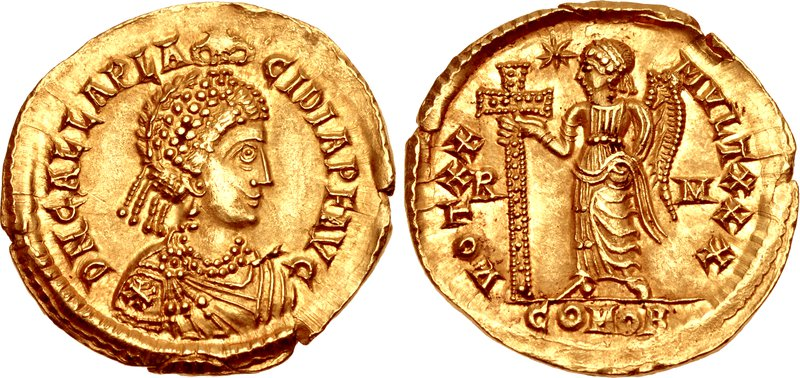
Solidus of Galla Placidia (Note: Inscription:d·n· galla placidia p·f· aug· ("Our Lady Galla Placidia, Pious Happy Augusta") The reverse shows Victory and a crux gemmata)

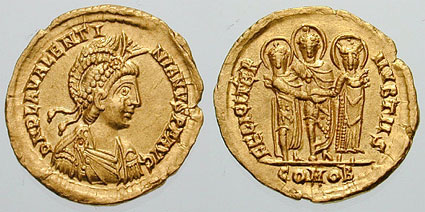
Solidus of Valentinian III celebrating an imperial marriage (Note: Theodosius II (centre) blessing Valentinian III (left) and Theodosius' daughter Licinia Eudoxia (right))

== Imperial members ==
In italics are members of the Valentinianic dynasty, descended from Theodosius I's second marriage to Galla, daughter of Valentinian the Great (r. 364–375).

- Theodosius I (379–395)
- Arcadius (r. 383–408)
- Magnus Maximus (r. 383-388, possible relative)
- Honorius (r. 393–423)
- Constantius III (421) through marriage to Galla Placidia
- Galla Placidia (r. 424–450)
- Pulcheria (r. 414–453)
- Theodosius II (r. 402–450)
- Valentinian III (r. 425–455)
- Petronius Maximus (455) through marriage to Licinia Eudoxia
- Marcian (r. 450–457) through marriage to Pulcheria
- Olybrius (472) through marriage to Placidia

Sometimes also counted

- Anthemius (r. 467–472) through marriage to Marcia Euphemia

== Stemmata ==
In italics the Augusti and the Augustae.

- Sextus Iulius Caesar (Ancestor)
- Marcus Actius
- Iulius Honorius married Flavia Actia / Iulius Theodosius / Iulius Eucherius
- Count Theodosius, married Flavia Thermantia and had issue:
  - Theodosius I, married firstly Aelia Flacilla and secondly Galla:
  - From marriage between Theodosius I and Aelia Flaccilla:
    - Arcadius, married Aelia Eudoxia and had issue:
      - Theodosius II, married Aelia Eudocia and had issue:
        - Licinia Eudoxia, married firstly Valentinian III (cousin of her father) and secondly Petronius Maximus.
        - Flaccilla.
        - Arcadius (possibly).
      - Flaccilla.
      - Pulcheria. Married Marcian.
      - The marriage of Pulcheria and Marcian was childless. However it brought into the dynasty a daughter of Marcian from a previous marriage.
        - Marcia Euphemia. Married Anthemius.
        - From marriage between Marcia Euphemia and Anthemius:
          - Anthemiolus.
          - Marcianus. Usurper emperor. Married Leontia, a daughter of Leo I and Verina.
          - Procopius Anthemius.
          - Romulus.
          - Alypia. Married Ricimer.
      - Arcadia.
      - Marina.
    - Honorius. Married first Maria and secondly Thermantia. They were sisters, daughters of Stilicho and Serena. From marriage of Honorius and Maria:
      - Didymus
      - Lagodius
      - Theodiosolus
      - Verinianus
      - Thermantia
      - Serena
    - Pulcheria.
  - From marriage between Theodosius I and Galla, d daughter of Valentinian I and Justina:
    - Gratianus.
    - Johannes.
    - Galla Placidia. Married first Ataulf and secondly Constantius III.
    - From marriage between Galla Placidia and Ataulf:
      - Theodosius.
    - From marriage between Galla Placidia and Constantius III:
      - Justa Grata Honoria. Granted the title Augusta. Proposed marriage to Attila the Hun, treaty never concluded. Married Flavius Bassus Herculanus.
      - Valentinian III, married Licinia Eudoxia (daughter of his cousin) and had issue:
        - Eudocia, married first Palladius, son of Petronius Maximus, and secondly Huneric. From marriage of Eudocia and Huneric king of Vandals:
          - Hilderic king of Vandals in North Africa.
        - Placidia, married Olybrius and had issue:
          - Anicia Juliana, married Areobindus and had issue:
            - Olybrius, married Irene, a niece of Anastasius I and had issue:
              - Proba. Married Anicius Probus Iunior and had issue:
                - Juliana, married Anastasius and had issue:
                  - Areobindus.
                  - Placidia.
                  - Proba.

== Family tree ==
THEODOSIAN DYNASTY detailed family tree

Theodosius magister equitum ∞ Thermantia	Valentinian I augustus 364–375 ∞ (2) Justina
1. Aelia Flaccilla; augusta 379–386	Theodosius I augustus 379–392	2. Galla; VALENTINIANIC DYNASTY	Honorius ∞Maria
Serena	Stilicho magister militum
Pulcheria b.385 ob. inf.	Arcadius augustus 383–408 ∞ Aelia Eudoxia augusta 400–404	(1) Maria	Honorius augustus 393–423	(2) Thermantia	Eucherius	Galla Placidia augusta 421–450 ∞ 1. Athaulf king of the Visigoths (Note: By whom, one son, Theodosius); 2. Constantius III augustus 421
Arcadia	1. (wife)	Marcian augustus 450–457	2. Pulcheria; augusta 414–453	Theodosius II augustus 402–450 ∞ Aelia Eudocia augusta 423–460
(1) Marcia Euphemia augusta c. 467–?	Anthemius augustus 467–472	Leo I augustus 457–474 ∞ Verina	Petronius Maximus augustus 455 ∞ 2. Licinia Eudoxia	Licinia Eudoxia augusta 439–c. 462 ∞ 1. Valentinian III; 2. Petronius Maximus	(2) Valentinian III augustus 425–455	(2) Honoria augusta 439–c. 450 ∞ Bassus Herculanus
Anthemiolus	Procopius Anthemius	Romulus	Alypia ∞ Ricimer magister militum	Marcianus usurper	Leontia; LEONID DYNASTY	(1) Palladius caesar	Eudocia ∞ 1. Palladius caesar 2. Huneric king of the Vandals	Placidia ∞ Olybrius augustus 472
Hilderic king of the Vandals	Anicia Juliana patricia ∞ Areobindus magister militum	Paulus consul 496	Anastasius I augustus 491–518
Olybrius consul 491	Irene

== Culture ==
Theodosians in art
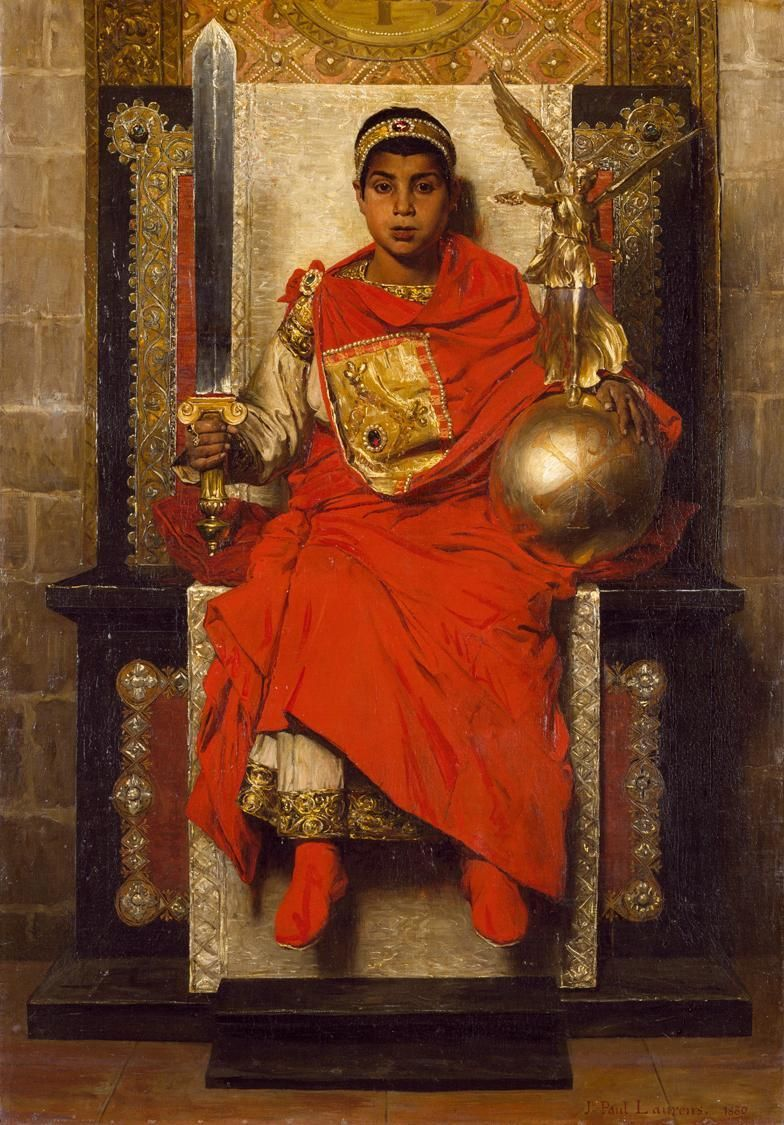
The Emperor Honorius by Jean-Paul Laurens, 1880
(Chrysler Museum of Art)

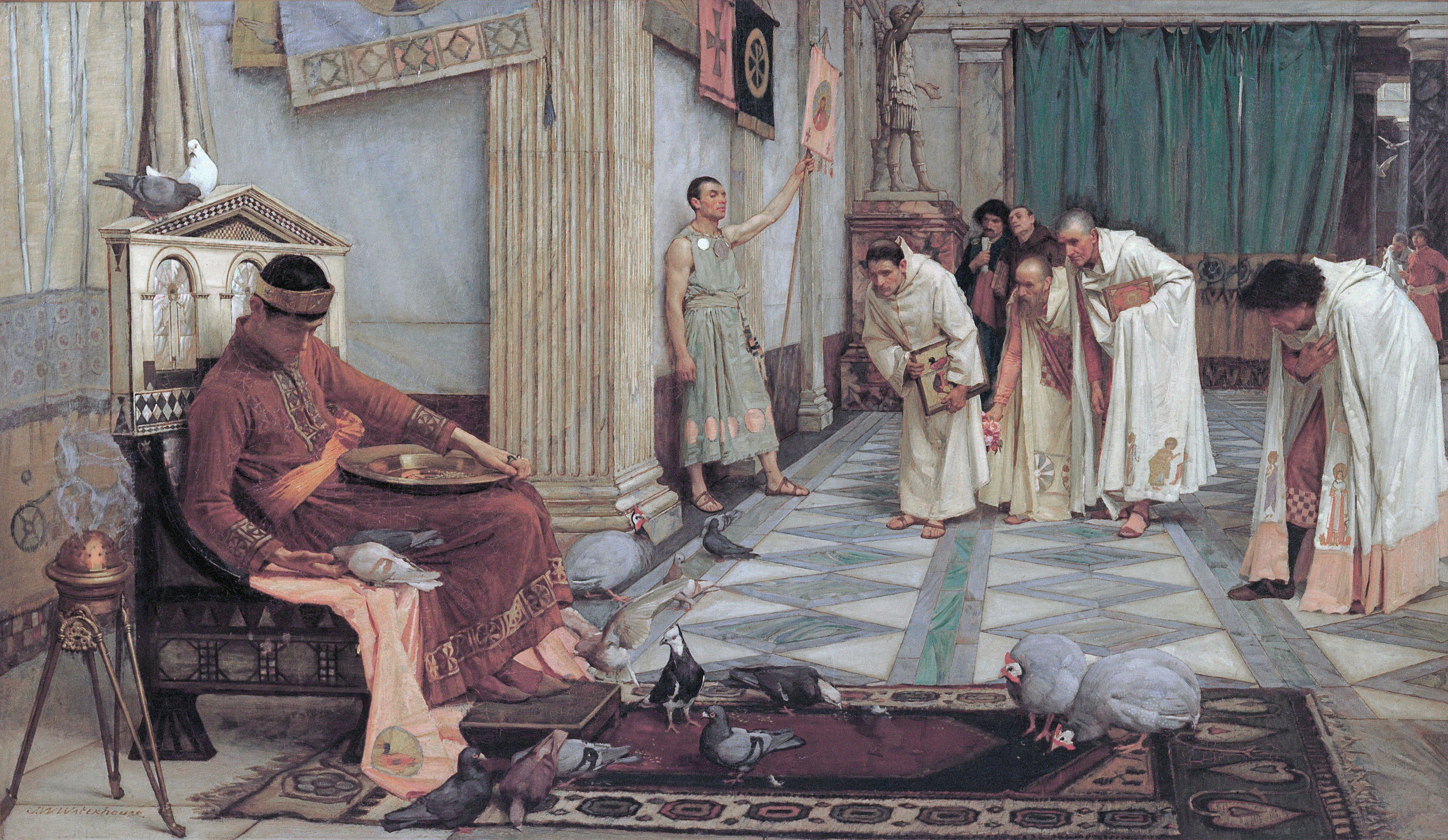
The Favourites of the Emperor Honorius, John William Waterhouse, c. 1883
(Art Gallery of South Australia)

== See also ==
- Byzantine Empire under the Theodosian dynasty

== Bibliography ==
=== Books and theses ===
- Cameron, Averil; Garnsey, Peter, eds. (1998). The Cambridge Ancient History, Volume XIII: The Late Empire, A.D. 337–425. The Cambridge Ancient History, second series. Cambridge University Press. ISBN 978-0-521-30200-5.
  - Blockley, R. C. (1998). The dynasty of Theodosius. pp. 111–137., in Cameron & Garnsey (1998)
  - Curran, John (1998). From Jovian to Theodosius. pp. 78–110., in Cameron & Garnsey (1998)
- Cameron, Averil; Ward-Perkins, Bryan; Whitby, Michael, eds. (2000). The Cambridge Ancient History XIV: Late antiquity. Empire and successors, A.D. 425–600. Cambridge University Press. ISBN 978-0-521-32591-2.
- Kienast, Dietmar; Eck, Werner; Heil, Matthäus (2017) [1990]. Römische Kaisertabelle: Grundzüge einer römischen Kaiserchronologie (in German) (6 ed.). Darmstadt: Wissenschaftliche Buchgesellschaft. ISBN 978-3-534-26724-8.{{link note|note=excerpts at
- Frakes, Robert M (2006). "The dynasty of Constantine down to 363". In Lenski, Noel Emmanuel (ed.). The Cambridge Companion to the Age of Constantine. Cambridge University Press. pp. 91–108. ISBN 978-0-521-52157-4.
- Humphries, Mark (2019). "Family, Dynasty, and the Construction of Legitimacy from Augustus to the Theodosians". In Tougher, Shaun (ed.). The Emperor in the Byzantine World: Papers from the Forty-Seventh Spring Symposium of Byzantine Studies. Taylor & Francis. pp. 13–27. ISBN 978-0-429-59046-7.
- Kulikowski, Michael (2006). Rome's Gothic Wars: From the Third Century to Alaric. Cambridge University Press. ISBN 978-1-139-45809-2.
- Kulikowski, Michael (2019). The Tragedy of Empire: From Constantine to the Destruction of Roman Italy. Harvard University Press. ISBN 978-0-674-66013-7.
- Lee, A. D. (2013). From Rome to Byzantium AD 363 to 565. Edinburgh University Press. ISBN 978-0-7486-6835-9.
- McEvoy, Meaghan (2013). Child Emperor Rule in the Late Roman West, AD 367-455. OUP. ISBN 978-0-19-966481-8.
- McLynn, Neil B. (2014) [1994]. Ambrose of Milan: Church and Court in a Christian Capital. University of California Press. ISBN 978-0-520-28388-6.
- Nicholson, Oliver, ed. (2018). The Oxford Dictionary of Late Antiquity 2 vols. Oxford: Oxford University Press. ISBN 978-0-19-866277-8. E-book: ISBN 978-0-19-256246-3. (see The Oxford Dictionary of Late Antiquity)
  - Bond, Sarah E (2018a). "Valentinian II". Valentinian II (371–92). Vol. 2. Oxford University Press. p. 1547. ISBN 978-0-19-866277-8., in Nicholson (2018)
  - Bond, Sarah E; Darley, Rebecca (2018a). "Valentinian I". Valentinian I (321–75). Vol. 2. Oxford University Press. pp. 1546–1547. ISBN 978-0-19-866277-8., in Nicholson (2018)
  - Bond, Sarah E; Darley, Rebecca (2018b). "Valens". Valens (328–78). Vol. 2. Oxford University Press. p. 1546. ISBN 978-0-19-866277-8., in Nicholson (2018)
  - Bond, Sarah E; Nicholson, Oliver (2018a). "Gratian". Gratian (359–83). Vol. 1. Oxford University Press. pp. 677–678. ISBN 978-0-19-866277-8., in Nicholson (2018)
  - Nathan, Geoffrey S (2018a). "Galla Placidia, Aelia". Galla Placidia, Aelia (c. 388–450). Vol. 1. Oxford University Press. p. 637. ISBN 978-0-19-866277-8., in Nicholson (2018)
  - Nicholson, Oliver (2018a). Pannonian emperors. Vol. 2. Oxford University Press. p. 637. ISBN 978-0-19-866277-8., in Nicholson (2018)
- Washington, Belinda (2015). The roles of imperial women in the Later Roman Empire (AD 306-455) (PhD thesis). University of Edinburgh.

=== Articles and websites ===
- Johnson, Mark J. (1991). "On the Burial Places of the Valentinian Dynasty". Historia: Zeitschrift für Alte Geschichte. 40 (4): 501–506. JSTOR 4436217.
- Kulikowski, Michael (1 January 2016). "Henning Börm, Westrom. Von Honorius bis Justinian". Klio. 98 (1): 393–396. doi:10.1515/klio-2016-0033. S2CID 193005098.
- McEvoy, Meaghan (2016). "Constantia: The Last Constantinian". Antichthon. 50: 154–179. doi:10.1017/ann.2016.10. S2CID 151430655.
- Lendering, Jona (10 August 2020). "Valentinian Dynasty". Livius.
