= Leonid dynasty =

Period of Byzantine history from 457 to 518

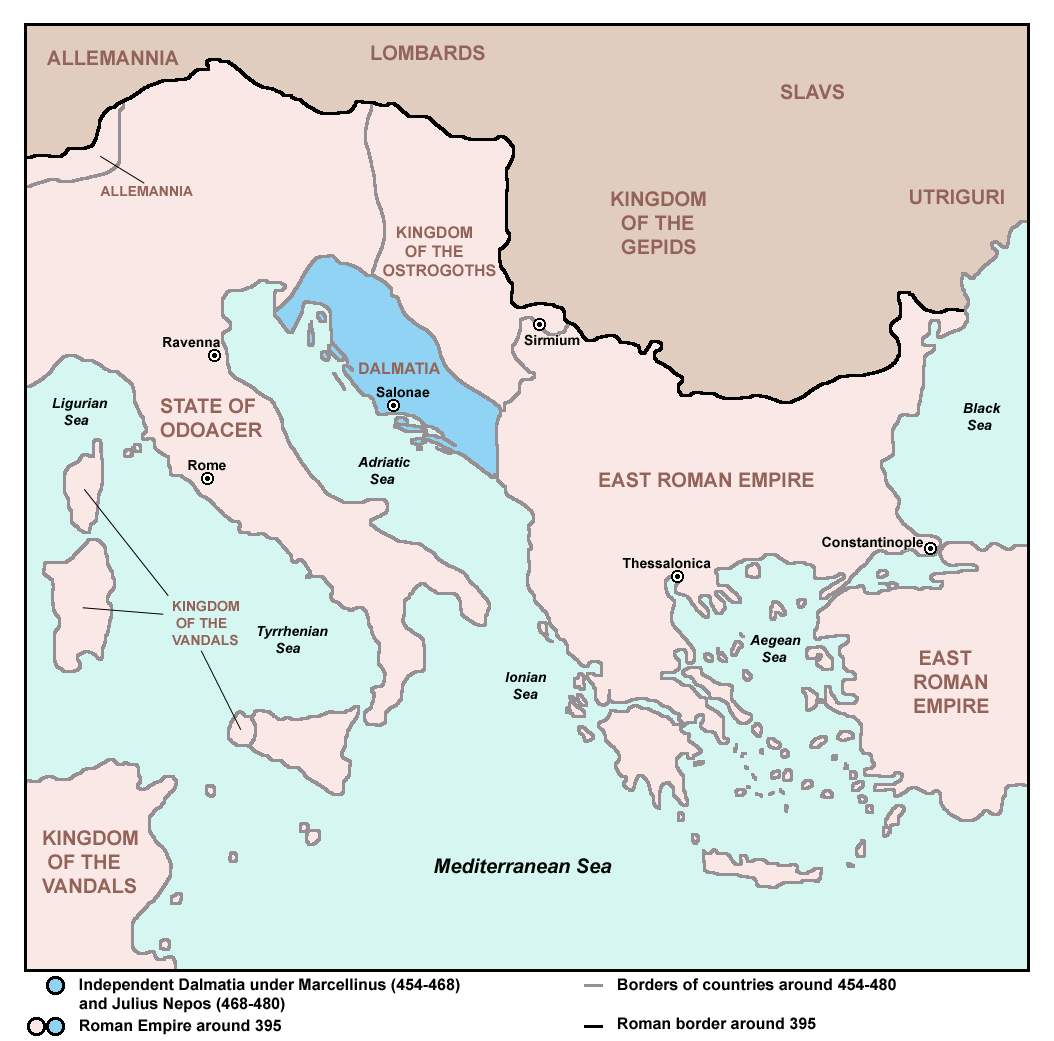
Dalmatia under Julius Nepos

The Leonid dynasty or Thracian dynasty produced six Byzantine emperors during Late Antiquity, reigning over the Byzantine Empire from 457 to 518. The dynasty's patriarch was Leo I, who was made Byzantine emperor in 457. Leo's daughter Ariadne became empress and mother to an emperor, and her two husbands were themselves each made emperor in turn. Another relative whose name does not survive of Leo I or his wife Verina married the future augustus Julius Nepos (r. 474–480), the last emperor in the Western Roman Empire. The dynasty of Leo succeeded the preceding Valentinianic dynasty (r. 364–455) and Theodosian dynasty (r. 379–457) whose family trees were conjoined and ruled concurrently. Besides Julius Nepos, who administered no more than a rump state encompassing the Roman province of Dalmatia in the western empire during the fall of the West, the dynasty's emperors governed the Byzantine Empire (east).

Leo's eldest daughter Ariadne married Zeno, and their son, Leo II was proclaimed augustus and succeeded his grandfather Leo as an infant, appointing Zeno co-augustus. Leo's younger daughter, Leontia, married first the caesar Patricius, son of the magister militum Aspar, and then Marcianus, son of the augustus Anthemius (r. 467–472). When Leo II died in the year of his grandfather's death, Zeno remained augustus in the Byzantine Empire.

Verina's brother Basiliscus, aided by her relative Armatus the magister militum, usurped the unpopular rule of Zeno in 475, though Zeno recovered the imperial capital Constantinople the following year with the connivance of Armatus. Leontia's husband Marcianus, the grandson of the augustus Marcian (r. 450–457) through his mother Marcia Euphemia, also attempted a usurpation of Zeno, together with his brothers Procopius Anthemius and Romulus.

When Zeno died, Ariadne married the silentarius Anastasius Dicorus and he was acclaimed and crowned augustus. Anastasius's brother Paulus's daughter Irene was married to Olybrius Junior, the grandson of the augustus Olybrius through his mother, the patricia Anicia Juliana and thus the most significant descendant of the Valentinianic–Theodosian imperial line and ignored in the succession on the death of Zeno. Anastasius was the final emperor of the Leonid dynasty, and on his death the administration passed to Justin I (r. 518–527), who with his nephew Justinian the Great (r. 527–565) founded the Justinian dynasty (r. 518–602). Under Justinian, Anastasius's nephews, Hypatius, Pompeius, and Probus were considered imperial candidates during the 532 Nika revolt in Constantinople, in which the Byzantines sought to depose Justinian.

== Members ==
Other members of the House of Leo were:

- Leo I "the Thracian" (Valerius Leo) (401–474, ruled 457–474) – soldier
  - Verina, wife of Leo I
    - Basiliscus ( ? – c. 477, ruled 475–476) – usurper; brother of Verina brother-in-law of Leo I
    - Armatus, magister militum, nephew of Basiliscus and Verina
    - Julius Nepos, married a niece of Leo I.
  - Leontia, daughter of Leo I, wife of Marcianus
  - Ariadne, daughter of Leo I, mother of Leo II, wife of Zeno and then of Anastasius I
  - Zeno, (425–491, ruled 474–475 and 476–491) – son-in-law of Leo I; orig. Tarasicodissa, an Isaurian
    - Leo II, (467–474, ruled 474) – grandson of Leo I, son of Zeno
  - Anastasius I, (430–518, ruled 491–518) – silentiarius; son-in-law of Leo I, elevated by selection by Zeno's widow Ariadne
  - Paulus, brother of Anastasius I
    - Probus, son of Paulus and nephew of Anastasius I
    - Hypatius, a nephew of Anastasius I and an influential Greens senator, was placed as the candidate to the purple during the Nika riots against the later emperor Justinian I.
    - Pompeius, a nephew of Anastasius I

== Family tree ==
1.(wife)	Marcian emperor of the East; 450–457	2.Pulcheria; THEODOSIAN DYNASTY
Basiliscus emperor of the East; 475–476 ∞ Zenonis	Verina	Leo I emperor of the East; 457–474	(1) Marcia Euphemia	Anthemius emperor of the West; 467–472
Vigilantia	Justin I emperor of the Romans; 518–527	(sibling)	(sibling)	2.Anastasius I Dicorus emperor of the Romans; 491–518	Ariadne	1.Zeno emperor of the East; 474–475; emperor of the Romans; 476–491	Leontia	Marcianus usurper
Justinian I emperor of the Romans; 527–565; JUSTINIAN DYNASTY	Theodora	(daughter)	Irene ∞ Olybrius consul 491; Valentinianic–Theodosian dynasty	Leo II emperor of the East; 474
(illeg.); Theodora	Anastasius consul 517
