= Procopius Anthemius (son of Anthemius) =

Son of Western Roman Emperor Anthemius

Procopius Anthemius (Greek: Προκόπιος Άνθέμιος; fl. 469–515 AD) was a politician of the Eastern Roman Empire, son of Western Roman Emperor Anthemius. After the death of the Eastern Roman Emperor Leo I, Procopius sided with his brother Marcianus's attempt to overthrow Zeno. When Marcianus's rebellion failed, Procopius fled to Thrace and then to Rome, returning to Constantinople after the death of Zeno and accession of Anastasius I. After his return to Constantinople, he was consul in 515.

== Biography ==
Procopius was the son of Anthemius and of Marcia Euphemia, daughter of the Eastern Roman Emperor. His brothers were Anthemiolus, Marcianus and Romulus; he also had a sister, Alypia.

He lived at Constantinople, at Eastern Emperor Leo I's court, while his father later ruled the Western Roman Empire (467-472), unsuccessfully trying to restore Roman power in the Western provinces beyond Italy and Gaul. During this time, his brother Anthemiolus died while leading an attack against the Visigoths (in 471) and his sister Alypia married Ricimer, the powerful magister militum of barbarian origin.

In 474, Leo died. He had left no sons and two daughters, the elder Ariadne, born before Leo was raised to the throne and married to the Isaurian general Zeno, and the younger Leontia, born when Leo was already emperor and married to Procopius' brother, Marcian.

The people of Constantinople despised the Isaurians, whom they considered barbarians; furthermore, Leontia's status as porphyrogenita gave her some sort of precedence to the throne, according to the faction that opposed Zeno. Marcian, helped by Procopius and Romulus, accordingly brought a force of citizen and foreign soldiers to Constantinople with the intent to seize power. The rebels gathered in the house of a Caesarius, south of the Forum of Theodosius, then began simultaneous attacks on the imperial palace and on the house of Illus, an Isaurian general who supported Zeno. With the help of civilian sympathizers they overwhelmed the loyalist troops and almost captured the emperor. After nightfall, Illus succeeded in moving an Isaurian unit quartered in nearby Chalcedonia into Constantinople and in corrupting Marcian's soldiers, who allowed Zeno to flee. On the following morning Marcian, understanding that his situation was desperate and that reinforcements under the Gothic general Theodoric Strabo would not arrive in time, took refuge in the church of the Holy Apostles, but was then arrested with his brothers.

They were sent to Caesarea in Cappadocia. With the help of some monks, they tried to escape, but Marcian failed, while Procopius fled to Theodoric Strabo in Thrace, – where the latter refused to hand him to Zeno – and then to Rome.

Later Procopius returned to Constantinople, during the reign of Anastasius I (491-518). Empress Ariadne asked Anastasius, whom she had married after Zeno's death, to appoint Procopius praetorian prefect. Anastasius refused, saying that the office required more learning than Procopius had. Nonetheless, Procopius was appointed consul for 515.

Procopius might be the Anthemius who was married to Herais and father of a Zeno betrothed to a nephew of Emperor Zeno; this Anthemius was probably a patricius.

== Bibliography ==
- Martindale, John R., ed. (1980). The Prosopography of the Later Roman Empire: Volume II, AD 395–527. Cambridge: Cambridge University Press. ISBN 0-521-20159-4.
- Mathisen, Ralph W., "Anthemius (12 April 467 - 11 July 472 A.D.)", De Imperatoribus Romanis

Political offices
Preceded by Cassiodorus	Roman consul 515 with Florentius	Succeeded by Petrus
