= Marcianus (son of Anthemius) =

Roman rebel

- Usurper of the Roman Empire
- Reign: c.Some point in 479 and 484
- Successor: Leontius (in 484)
- Born: Unknown
- Died: After 484 AD
- Spouse: Leontia Porphyrogenita
Regnal name
- Imperator Caesar Flavius Marcianus Augustus
- Father: Anthemius
- Mother: Marcia Euphemia
- Occupation: Roman Consul (469) (472)

Flavius Marcianus (Greek: Μαρκιανός, fl. AD 469–484) was a member of the Leonid dynasty. The son of the Western emperor Anthemius, Marcianus married Leontia, the daughter of the Eastern Roman emperor Leo I. He was consul twice, and in 479 unsuccessfully attempted to overthrow the emperor Zeno. After his capture he was forced to become a monk; he escaped and raised an army but was defeated and recaptured by Flavius Appalius Illus Trocundes. In 484, when the Isaurian general Illus revolted against Zeno, Marcianus was freed and Illus proclaimed him emperor, before deposing him in favour of Leontius.

== Biography ==
Marcianus was a member of several Roman imperial families. His father was Anthemius, Western Roman emperor between 467 and 472, who descended from Procopius, usurper in 365–366 against Emperor Valens and relative of Emperor Julian's (360-363). Marcianus's mother was Marcia Euphemia, daughter of Marcian (Eastern Roman Emperor in 450–457) with an unknown woman. Marcianus had three brothers - Anthemiolus, who died in Gaul in 471, Procopius Anthemius and Romulus - and a sister, Alypia, wife of the Western magister militum Ricimer.

To strengthen the bonds between the Western and Eastern Roman empires, Marcianus married Leontia, daughter of the Eastern Roman Emperor Leo I and his wife Verina (the elder sister of Leontia's, Ariadne, had married the powerful general Zeno), and was chosen as consul without colleague twice, in 469 and 472.

At the death of Leo I, he was succeeded by Marcianus' nephew Leo II, son of Zeno and Ariadne, but the young Emperor died that same year at the age of 7. Zeno, who had been proclaimed joint emperor with his son, became the only Eastern Roman Emperor, but his succession was not welcomed by many. The people of Constantinople considered him a barbarian because of his Isaurian origin (he had even changed his original name, Tarasicodissa, to the Greek Zeno), while some preferred Marcianus to him as his wife, Ariadne, was born while Leo I was an obscure soldier, while Leontia was born while Leo was Emperor. Zeno's power was challenged by Basiliscus, Verina's brother, who succeeded in overthrowing Zeno in 475 and held power for one year before Zeno took back the throne.

In 479 Marcianus tried to overthrow Zeno. With the help of his brothers Procopius Anthemius and Romulus, he gathered troops composed of both citizens and foreigners in the house of a Caesarius, south of the Forum of Theodosius in Constantinople, and from there they marched simultaneously on the Imperial palace and on the house of Illus, an Isaurian general who supported Zeno. The Emperor almost fell into the hands of the rebels, who, during the day, overwhelmed the imperial troops, who were attacked also by the citizens from the roofs of their houses. During the night, however, Illus brought an Isaurian unit quartered in nearby Chalcedonia into the city and corrupted Marcianus's soldiers, who allowed Zeno to flee. On the following morning Marcianus, understanding that his situation was desperate and that the reinforcements of the Gothic general Theodoric Strabo would not arrive in time, took refuge in the church of the Holy Apostles, but was arrested with his brothers.

He was sent to Caesarea in Cappadocia with his brothers. With the help of some monks, he tried to escape, but, while his brothers succeeded, he was captured and obliged to become a monk in Tarsus (Cilicia), or imprisoned in Isauria, in the fortress of Papurius. He tried to escape a second time, and this time he succeeded, but, after gathering new troops and attacking Ancyra, he was defeated and captured by Trocundes, Illus' brother.

In 484 Illus organised a revolt against Zeno. As he did not want to take the purple for himself, he freed Marcianus and proclaimed him Emperor. Illus freed Verina, too (Zeno had previously exiled her), but then decided to depose Marcianus and elevate Leontius to the throne; Marcianus was then sent to Italy to ask for Odoacer's help.

== Bibliography ==
- Evagrius Scholasticus, Historia ecclesiastica, 3.26.
- John of Antioch, fragment 211.3-4, 214.2.
- Theodorus Lector, 116.10-19.
- Theophanes the Confessor, 126.35-127.11.
- John Bagnall Bury, "X.2 The Revolts of Marcian and Illus (A.D. 479‑488)", in History of the Later Roman Empire, Dover Books [1923], 1958. pp. 395, 397–398.
- Mathisen, Ralph W., "Anthemius (12 April 467 - 11 July 472 A.D.)", De Imperatoribus Romanis
- Smith, Dictionary of Greek and Roman Biography and Mythology, v. 1, pp.

Political offices
Preceded by Anthemius Augustus II	Roman consul 469 with Zeno	Succeeded by Messius Phoebus Severus; Iordanes
