= Marcia Euphemia =

- Augusta
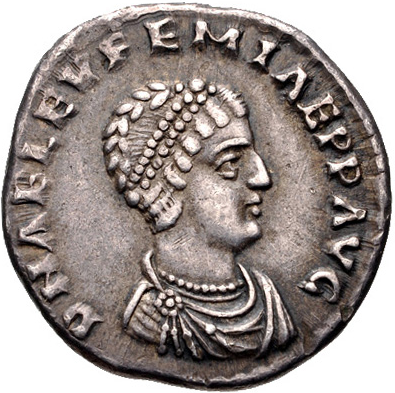
- Reproduction of a coin depicting Marcia Euphemia

Roman empress
- Tenure: 467 – 472
- Born: Constantinople (modern-day Istanbul, Turkey)
- Spouse: Anthemius
- Issue: Alypia; Anthemiolus; Marcianus; Procopius Anthemius; Romulus
- Dynasty: Theodosian dynasty
- Father: Marcian

Marcia Euphemia, also known as Aelia Marcia Euphemia (Greek: Μαρκία Εύφημία), was the wife of Anthemius, Western Roman Emperor.

== Family ==
Marcia Euphemia was the only known daughter of Marcian, Eastern Roman emperor; her mother's identity is not preserved. Ancient sources variously identify Euphemia's paternal ancestry as Thracian (Evagrius Scholasticus, quoting Priscus) or Illyrian (Theodorus Lector). Her stepmother was Pulcheria, with whom Marcian had contracted a political marriage to link himself to the Theodosian dynasty. As Pulcheria had taken a religious vow of chastity, the marriage was never consummated and Euphemia never had younger half-siblings.

== Marriage ==
In or around the year 453, Euphemia married Anthemius, the son of Procopius, magister utriusque militiae ("Master of Soldiers of both armies", commander of both cavalry and infantry) of the Eastern Roman Empire from 422 to 424. The marriage had political implications; as the daughter of Marcian, Euphemia "added imperial grandeur to the illustrious lineage of Anthemius himself".

Marcian granted his new son-in-law a series of honors and responsibilities, seemingly intended to prepare Anthemius for eventual elevation to the imperial office. Following the marriage Anthemius was appointed a Comes rei militaris and sent to fortify the Danube frontier, still in disarray following the death of Attila the Hun. He returned to Constantinople in 454 and was rewarded by Marcian with the offices of magister militum and Patrician. In 455 he served as co-consul with Valentinian III. John Malalas states that Marcian took the final step and named Anthemius emperor of the Western Roman Empire, but this is considered an anachronism of the chronicler.

== Death of Marcian ==
In January 457 Marcian succumbed to a disease, allegedly gangrene, and was survived by Euphemia and Anthemius.

With the death of her father, Euphemia was no longer a member of the imperial family. Anthemius continued to serve as magister militum under Marcian's successor, Leo I.

== Empress consort ==
According to Priscus, Geiseric, King of the Vandals, having exhausted Sicily and Italia with a decade of raiding, began to expand his activities into the Eastern empire. The Western throne had been vacant since 465, and Leo decided to deal with the new threat by appointing a Western Roman Emperor to face Geiseric.

Leo chose Anthemius, who journeyed to Rome and was proclaimed emperor on 12 April 467. Euphemia was featured as an Augusta in Roman currency from c. 467 to 472. In acknowledgement of her vital role in linking Anthemius with the Theodosian Dynasty, her coins spell out her name with unusual thoroughness. These coins are the sole evidence for her role as Empress, as the literary accounts cease mentioning her by the point Anthemius moved to Italia. According to the fragmentary chronicle of John of Antioch, a 7th-century monk tentatively identified with John of the Sedre, in 472 Anthemius was slain in a civil war. Whether Euphemia survived her husband is unknown.

== Children ==
Euphemia and Anthemius had five known children, one daughter and four sons:

- Alypia, wife of Ricimer.
- Anthemiolus
- Marcianus, married to Leontia, younger daughter of Leo I and Verina. The couple led a failed revolt against Zeno in 478–479. They were exiled to Isauria following their defeat.
- Procopius Anthemius
- Romulus

Royal titles
Preceded by Licinia Eudoxia	Western Roman Empress consort c. 467–472	Succeeded by Placidia
