= Pusaeus =

Roman politician

Pusaeus (Greek: Πουσαίος; fl. 465–467) was a politician of the Roman Empire.

== Biography ==
Pusaeus was a pupil of the Neoplatonist philosopher Proclus, at his school in Alexandria. Other noteworthy figures belonged to the same pagan circle and studied with Pusaeus, such as Pamprepius (poet and supporter of Illus' usurpation), Marcellinus (later semi-independent military commander of Illyricum), Anthemius (consul and western emperor), and Messius Phoebus Severus (Consul and praefectus urbi).

In 465 Pusaeus was praetorian prefect of the East. In 467, while his old friend Anthemius sat on the Western throne, he held the consulate.

An inscription in Latin, surrounded by Greek inscriptions, and walled in the walls of Constantinople (near the fifth tower), reads: "Pusaeus, no less than the great Anthemius, strengthened towers and walls".

== Bibliography ==
- O'Meara, Dominic, Platonopolis: Platonic Political Philosophy in Late Antiquity, Oxford University Press, 2003, ISBN 0-19-925758-2, p. 21.

Preceded by Leo Augustus III; Tatianus (in Gaul)	Roman consul 467 with Iohannes	Succeeded by Anthemius Augustus II
