= Chronica Gallica =

Chronica Gallica may refer to:

- Chronica Gallica of 452
- Chronica Gallica of 511
