= Hormidac =

Military leader of the Huns

Hormidac (fl. 466/467) was a military leader of the Huns, who commanded an expedition against the Eastern Roman Empire in the winter of 466/467. He raided Dacia mediterranea before being defeated by Anthemius.

== Biography ==
Taking advantage of the fact that the Danube had frozen over, Hormidac and his Huns descended on the city of Serdica (modern Sofia) so suddenly that they were able to enter it before the defenders could close its doors.

The emperor of the East Marcian then sent the magister militum Anthemius, future emperor of the West, with an army, which put the city under siege. The devastation of the countryside surrounding Serdica was such that it was difficult for Anthemius to find enough food and drink for his troops; the fact that it was winter could only make the situation worse. However, the fact that even the Huns were not in better conditions, locked up to defend themselves inside a city after they had foreseen a raid, played to the advantage of Anthemius; Hormidac then decided to break the delay and went out with his army to face Anthemius.

Shortly before the start of the battle, the commander of the cavalry of Anthemius (perhaps a "barbarian") passed to Hormidac's side, who therefore found himself facing a Roman army without cavalry. Despite the advantage, the Roman infantry had the upper hand over the troops of Hormidac, who was forced to ask Anthemius for peace; the Roman general agreed to have the Hun contingent removed, on condition that he would receive the traitor. The defector was then put to death in the sight of both armies.

== Etymology ==
Otto Manchen-Helfen thought the name be probably of Iranian origin, though with the Huns etymology and ethnicity rarely go hand in hand. Walter Bruno Henning connected it to Hormizdak, a popular Middle Persian name in Sassanian times. Iranologists Mary Boyce and Ilya Gershevitch thought the name could not be etymologized.
