= Romanus (usurper) =

- Usurper of the Western Roman Empire
- Reign: 470
- Predecessor: Anthemius
- Successor: Anthemius
- Died: 470; Rome, Italia

Romanus (died 470) was a Roman usurper in the Western Roman Empire who unsuccessfully rebelled against the Emperor Anthemius in 470 before being executed at Rome.

== Career ==
Romanus was a Roman Senator and a Patrician who had achieved the rank of Magister officiorum during the final decades of the Western Roman Empire. A known supporter of Ricimer, the Magister militum, this brought him into conflict with the Emperor Anthemius, who both distrusted and disliked Ricimer.

In 470, Anthemius fell seriously ill, and it was rumored that sorcery had been used to afflict the emperor. Ricimer saw an opportunity to install a new puppet emperor, and began to lay the groundwork for the accession of Romanus to the imperial throne. However, Anthemius eventually recovered, and accused a number of Ricimer's supporters of using sorcery to try to bring about his death, including Romanus, whom he also accused of seeking to usurp his throne. He had the senator beheaded in 470, an act which he hoped would secure his throne.

In fact, it did the opposite. Ricimer became furious about the death of Romanus, and was the trigger which he used to move against Anthemius, whom he deposed in 472.

== Sources ==
- Mathisen, Ralph W., "Anthemius (12 April 467 – 11 July 472 A.D.)", De Imperatoribus Romanis, 1998
- MacGeorge, Penny, Late Roman Warlords, Oxford University Press, 2002
- Martindale, John R., ed. (1980). "Romanus 4". The Prosopography of the Later Roman Empire: Volume II, AD 395–527. Cambridge: Cambridge University Press. p. 947. ISBN 0-521-20159-4.
