= Romulus (son of Anthemius) =

Son of Western Roman Emperor Anthemius

Romulus (Greek: Ρωμήλος, fl. 469–479 AD) was a son of Western Roman Emperor Anthemius.

== Biography ==
Romulus was the son of Anthemius (Western Roman Emperor in 467–472) and of Marcia Euphemia. His brothers were Anthemiolus, Marcianus and Procopius Anthemius, his sister was Alypia. His maternal grandfather, the Eastern Emperor Marcian, had married Pulcheria, granddaughter of Theodosius I.

In 479, Romulus and his brother Marcianus and Procopius rebelled against the new Eastern Emperor, Zeno. They asked for the help of Theodoric Strabo, then gathered in Constantinople troops composed by both citizens and foreigners in the house of a Caesarius, south of the Forum of Theodosius, and from there they marched at the same time on the imperial palace and on the house of Illus, an Isaurian general supporter of Zeno. The emperor almost fell in the hands of the rebels, who, during the day, overwhelmed the imperial troops, who were hit also by the citizens from the roofs of their houses. During the night, however, Illus succeeded in moving inside Constantinople an Isaurian unit whose quarters were in the nearby Chalcedonia and in corrupting Marcianus's soldiers, who allowed Zeno to flee. On the following morning Romulus and his brothers, understanding that his situation was desperate and that the reinforcements of the Gothic general Theodoric Strabo would have not arrive in time, took refuge in the church of the Holy Apostles, but were arrested.

They were sent to Caesarea in Cappadocia. With the help of some monks, they tried to escape, but Marcianus failed, while Romulus and Procopius fled to Rome

== Bibliography ==
- Evagrius Scholasticus, Historia ecclesiastica, 3.26.
- Theodorus Lector, 4209.
- Theophanes the Confessor, AM 5971
- John Bagnall Bury, "X.2 The Revolts of Marcian and Illus (A.D. 479‑488)", in History of the Later Roman Empire, Dover Books [1923], 1958. pp. 395, 397-398
- Martindale, John R., ed. (1980). "Romulus 3". The Prosopography of the Later Roman Empire: Volume II, AD 395–527. Cambridge: Cambridge University Press. p. 949. ISBN 0-521-20159-4.
- Mathisen, Ralph W., "Anthemius (12 April 467 - 11 July 472 A.D.)", De Imperatoribus Romanis
- Smith, Dictionary of Greek and Roman Biography and Mythology, "Illus"
