= Procopius (magister militum) =

Roman patrician and military leader (fl. 420s)

- Title: Patrician
- Children: Anthemius
- Family: Procopius (ancestor)
- Military career
- Service: Late Roman army
- Commands: Orientem
- Conflicts: Roman–Sasanian War

Procopius (Greek: Προκόπιος; fl. 420s) was a Roman patrician and military leader.

Descended from a Roman usurper, the same-named Procopius, Procopius was and married to the daughter of Flavius Anthemius, and the father of Anthemius, the Roman emperor.

In the Roman–Sasanian War of 421–422, Procopius commanded soldiers of the late Roman army (possibly as a dux or comes rei militaris) and secured the rescue of Roman units that were ambushed by Zhayedan forces. In 422, he was an envoy in the conflict-ending negotiations. For these successes, Procopius was awarded the title of patrician and made magister militum per Orientem (possibly by Theodosius II to succeed Ardabur), a post he held through at least 424.
