= Alypia (daughter of Anthemius) =

- Augusta

Roman empress
- Tenure: 467 – 472? (with Marcia Euphemia)
- Died: After 472
- Spouse: Ricimer
- Dynasty: Theodosian dynasty
- Father: Anthemius
- Mother: Marcia Euphemia

Alypia (fl. 467–472 AD) was a noblewoman of the Western Roman Empire, daughter of the Western Roman Emperor Anthemius.

== Life ==
Alypia was the only daughter of Anthemius and Aelia Marcia Euphemia, and granddaughter of the Eastern Roman Emperor Marcian.

The Eastern Roman Emperor Leo I appointed Anthemius Western Emperor in 467, and so Alypia's marriage became an important moment in Anthemius' rule. Anthemius married his daughter to Ricimer, the magister militum of the West and power behind the throne; the aim of this bond was to strengthen the relationship between Anthemius and his magister militum, who had already deposed three Western Emperors.

However, Alypia's marriage did not bring peace between the Emperor and his general, possibly because the two of them had no children. In April 472, Ricimer appointed Olybrius as Emperor, in opposition to Anthemius, who, together with his family, was besieged in Rome. Around the middle of July, Anthemius and his family were captured by Ricimer; Anthemius was beheaded, while Alypia's subsequent history is unknown.

In the numismatic collection of Dumbarton Oaks, there is a coin (a solidus) on which Euphemia and Alypia are depicted. Here Alypia's figure is smaller than her mother's, as a sign of respect, but the two women dress using the same vestments, those typical of the Augusta; it is therefore possible that both Euphemia and Alypia were appointed Augustae.
