= Leo I (emperor) =

Eastern Roman emperor from 457 to 474

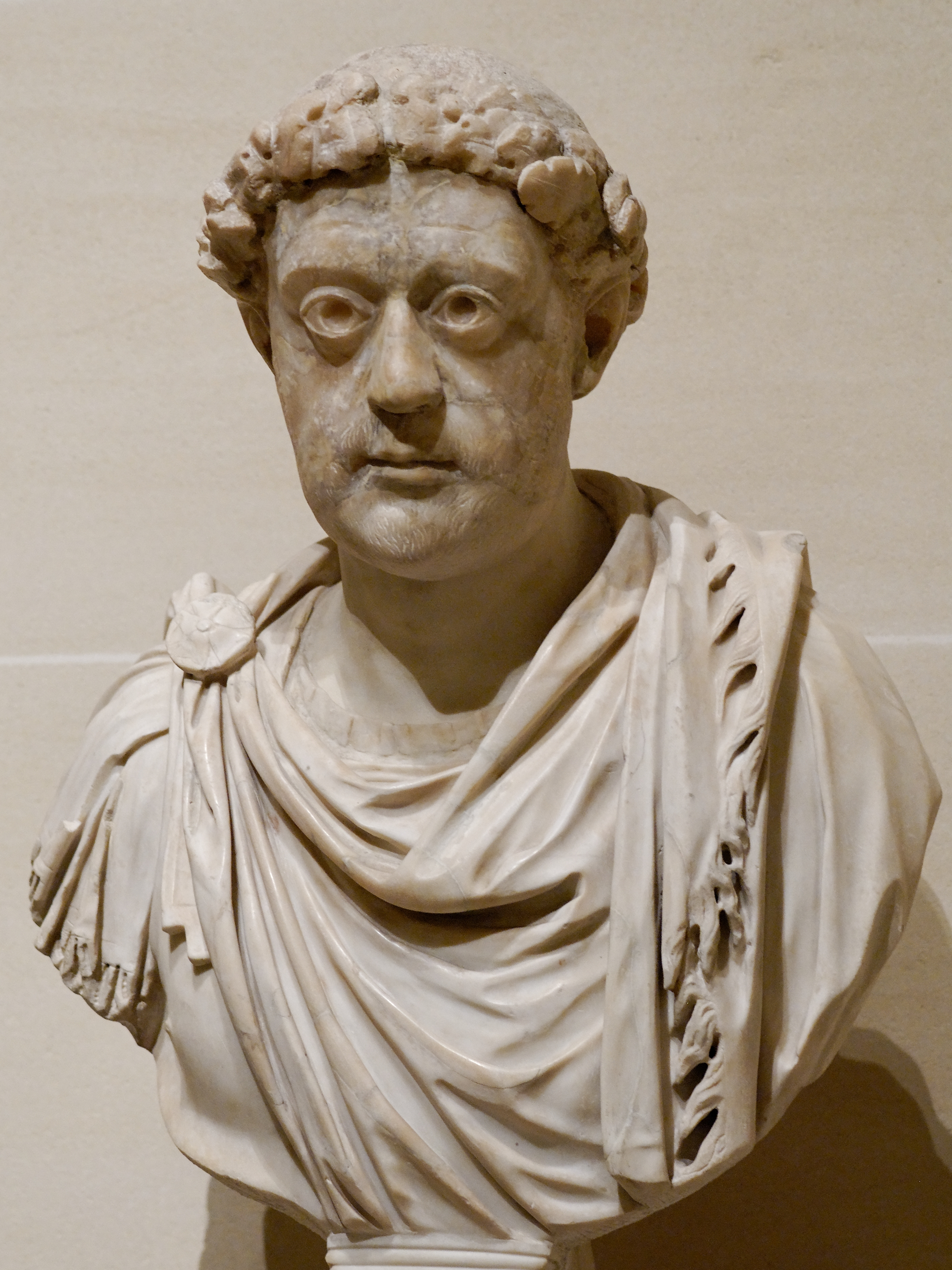
- Alabaster head of an emperor set in a modern bust, Louvre. The head wears a civic crown. (Note: The traditional identification with Leo I is not certain. The head depicts the emperor with a short beard, which matches some coins of Leo I.)

Roman emperor of the East
- Reign: 7 February 457 – 18 January 474
- Coronation: 7 February 457
- Predecessor: Marcian
- Successor: Leo II
- Western emperors: Majorian (457–461); Libius Severus (461–465); Anthemius (467–472); Olybrius (472); Glycerius (473–474)
- Born: c. 401; Thracia or Dacia Aureliana, Eastern Roman Empire
- Died: 18 January 474 (aged 73); Constantinople
- Spouse: Verina
- Issue: Ariadne, Leontia, unnamed son
Regnal name
- Latin: Imperator Caesar Flavius Leo Augustus; Ancient Greek: Αὐτοκράτωρ καῖσαρ Φλάβιος Λέων αὐγουστος (Note: Leo's full name is commonly given as Flavius Valerius Leo, but this is not corroborated by either The Prosopography of the Later Roman Empire nor the Oxford Dictionary of Byzantium.)
- Dynasty: Leonid
- Religion: Chalcedonian Christianity

Saint Leo the Great
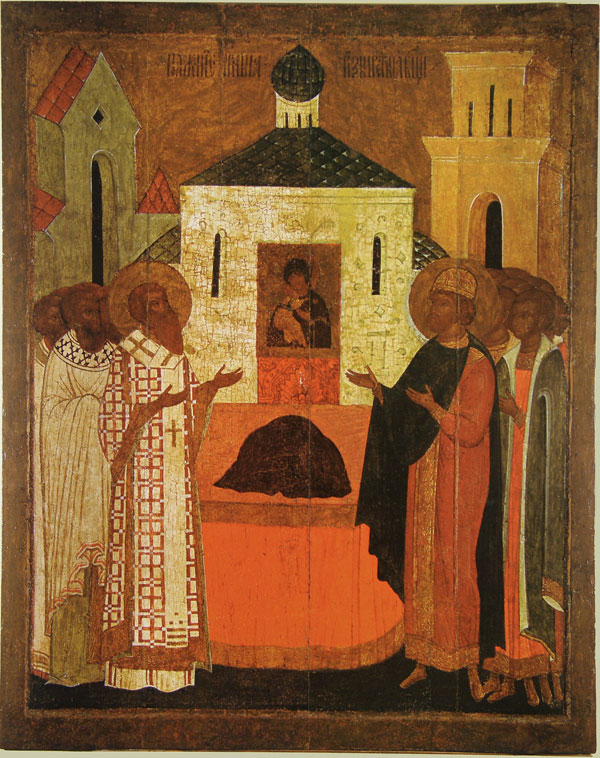
- 16th cent. Russian icon depicting St. Leo's enshrinement of the Robe of the Theotokos in Sts. Peter and Mark church, Blachernae

Holy and Right-Believing Emperor of the Romans
- Venerated in: Eastern Orthodox Church; Catholic Church
- Feast: 20 January
- Attributes: Imperial attire

Leo I (Latin: Leo; Ancient Greek: Λέων, romanized: Leōn; c. 401 – 18 January 474), also known as the Thracian (Latin: Thrax; Ancient Greek: ὁ Θρᾷξ, romanized: ō Thrâix), (Note: Despite the regular use of the nickname Thrax by modern sources, this was not used by contemporary writers. Ancient sources rather call him the Butcher (Latin: Macellus; Ancient Greek: Μακέλλης, romanized: Makellēs), referencing the murder of Aspar and his son.) was Eastern Roman emperor from 457 to 474. He was a native of Dacia Aureliana near historic Thrace. He is sometimes surnamed with the epithet the Great (Latin: Magnus; Ancient Greek: ὁ Μέγας, romanized: ō Mégas), probably to distinguish him from his young grandson and co-augustus Leo II (Ancient Greek: ὁ Μικρός, romanized: ō Mikrós, lit. 'the Small'). (Note: Bury 1958, Chapter X: the reign of Leo I, p. 323, note 1. "After the coronation of the child the two Leos would be distinguished as Λέων ὁ Μέγας and Λέων ὁ Μικρός, and this I believe, must be the origin of the designation of Leo as 'the Great'; just as reversely Theodosius II. was called 'the Small', because in his infancy he had been known as ὁ μικρός βασιλεύς to distinguish him from Arcadius. Leo never did anything which could conceivably earn him the title of Great in the sense in which it was bestowed by posterity on Alexander or Constantine.")

During his 17-year rule, he oversaw a number of ambitious political and military plans, aimed mostly at aiding the faltering Western Roman Empire and recovering its former territories. He is notable for being the first Eastern Emperor to legislate in Koine Greek rather than Late Latin. He is commemorated as a saint in the Eastern Orthodox Church, with his feast day on 20 January.

== Early life ==
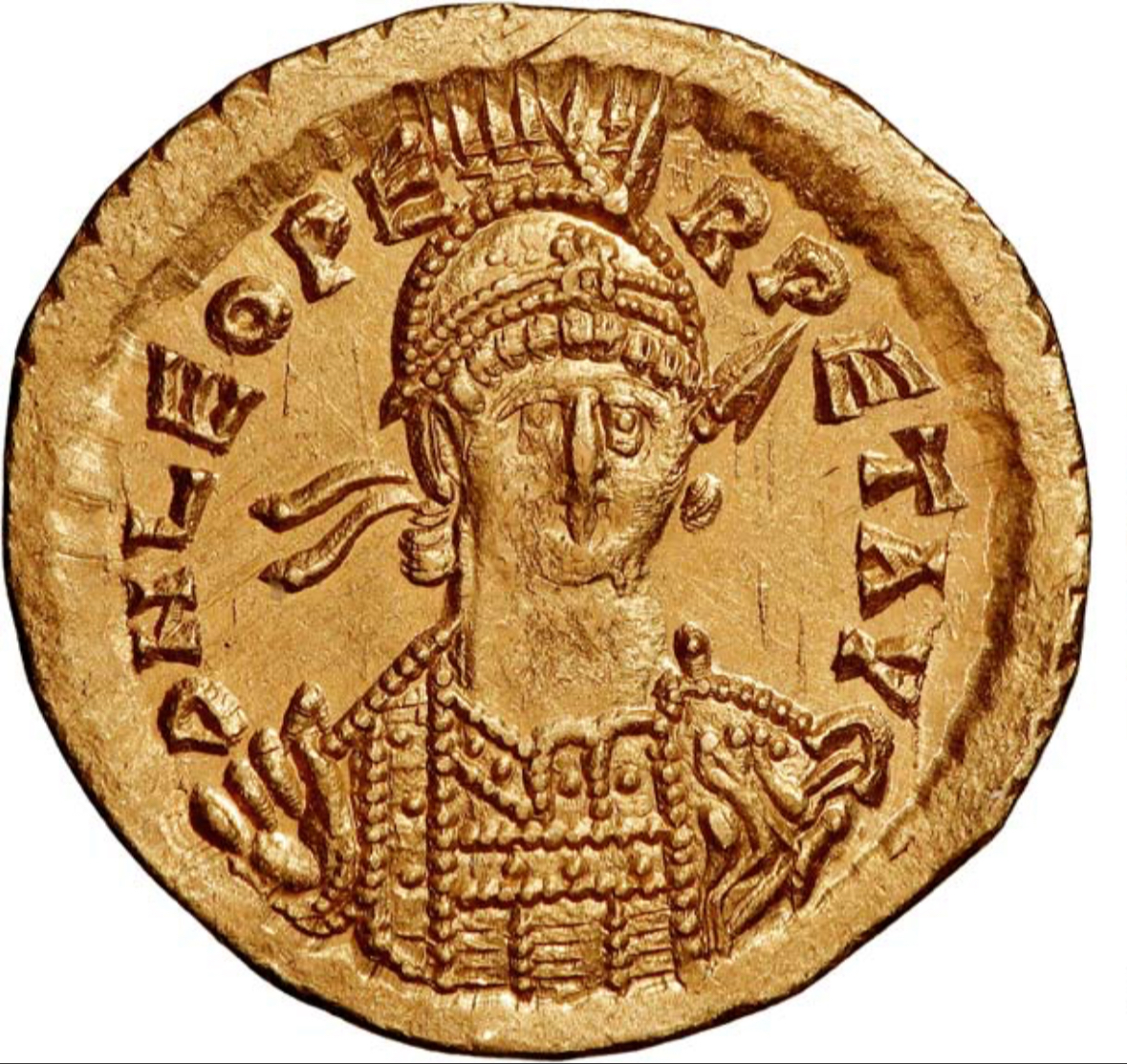
Solidus of Leo I from 457 the first year of his reign

He was born in Thracia or in Dacia Aureliana province in the year 401 to a Thraco-Roman family. His Dacian origin is mentioned by Candidus Isaurus, while John Malalas believes that he was of Bessian Thracian stock.

According to the Patria of Constantinople he had one sister, Euphemia, who never married; Leo is said to have visited her in Constantinople on a weekly basis, and she later erected a statue in his honor. The late and not particularly reliable source for Euphemia leaves her existence open to doubt.

Leo served in the Roman army, rising to the rank of comes rei militaris.

== Reign ==
He was the last of a series of emperors placed on the throne by Aspar, the Alan serving as commander-in-chief of the army, who thought Leo would be an easy puppet ruler. Instead, Leo became more and more independent from Aspar, causing tension that would culminate in Aspar's assassination.

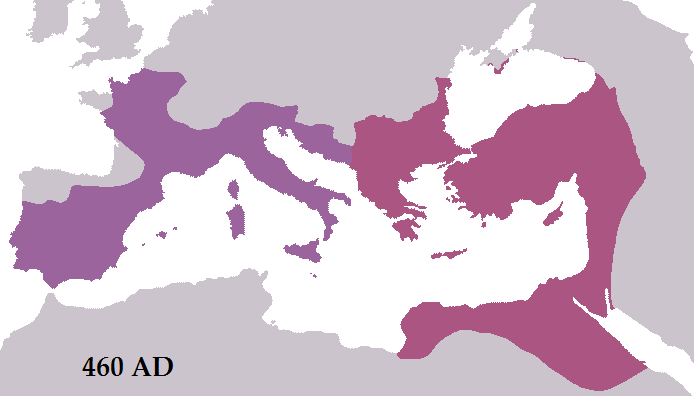
The Roman Empire in 460 during the reign of Leo

Leo's coronation as emperor on 7 February 457 was the first to add a Christian element to the traditional Roman procedure. Though he was already crowned by the campidoctor in the official coronation ceremony at Hebdomon, he went to Hagia Sophia and deposited his crown at the altar. As he left the church, the Patriarch of Constantinople placed the crown back on his head, a fact which symbolized the transformation of Roman imperial traditions into Medieval Roman and Christian ones. This Christian coronation ritual was later imitated by courts all over Europe.

His coronation adventus gave a key role to Aspar, who rode with Leo in his chariot during the procession in Constantinople and offered him a golden crown when they arrived at the Forum of Constantine.

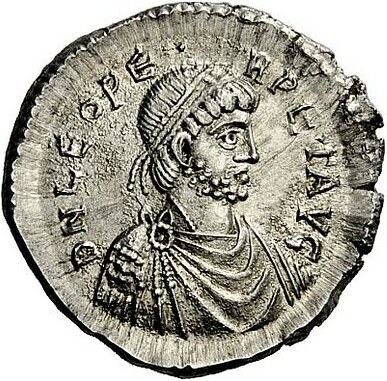
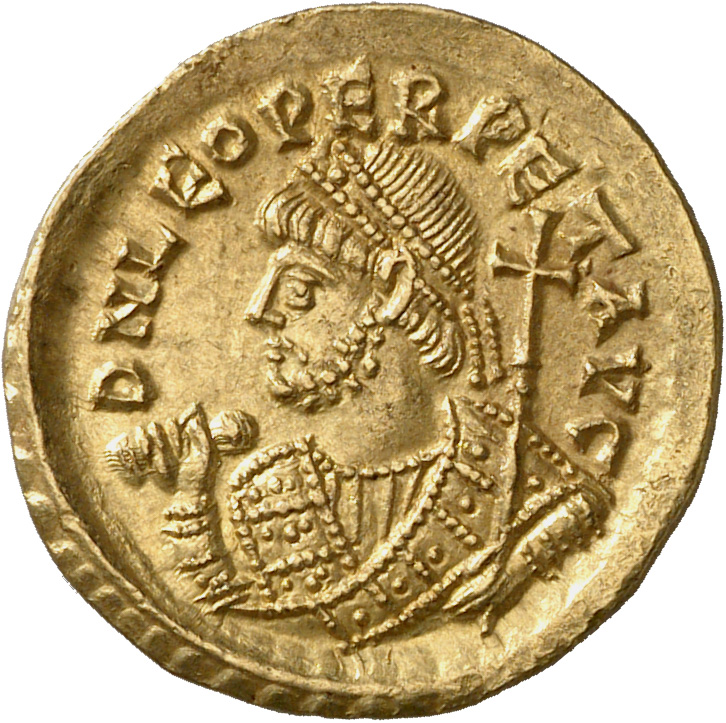
A rare miliarense (left; from Constantinople), and a solidus (right; Thessaloniki) of Leo, both from 474

Leo I made an alliance with the Isaurians and was thus able to eliminate Aspar. The price of the alliance was the marriage of Leo's daughter to Tarasicodissa, leader of the Isaurians, who, as Zeno, became emperor in 474. In 469, Aspar attempted to assassinate Zeno and very nearly succeeded. Finally, in 471, Aspar's son Ardabur was implicated in a plot against Leo but was killed by palace eunuchs acting on Leo's orders.

Leo sometimes overestimated his abilities and made mistakes that threatened the internal order of the Empire. The Balkans were ravaged by the Ostrogoths, after a disagreement between the Emperor and the young chief Theodoric the Great, who had been raised at Leo's court in Constantinople, where he was steeped in Roman government and military tactics. There were also some raids by the Huns. However, none of these attackers had the siege engines necessary to capture Constantinople, whose walls had been rebuilt and reinforced in the reign of Theodosius II.

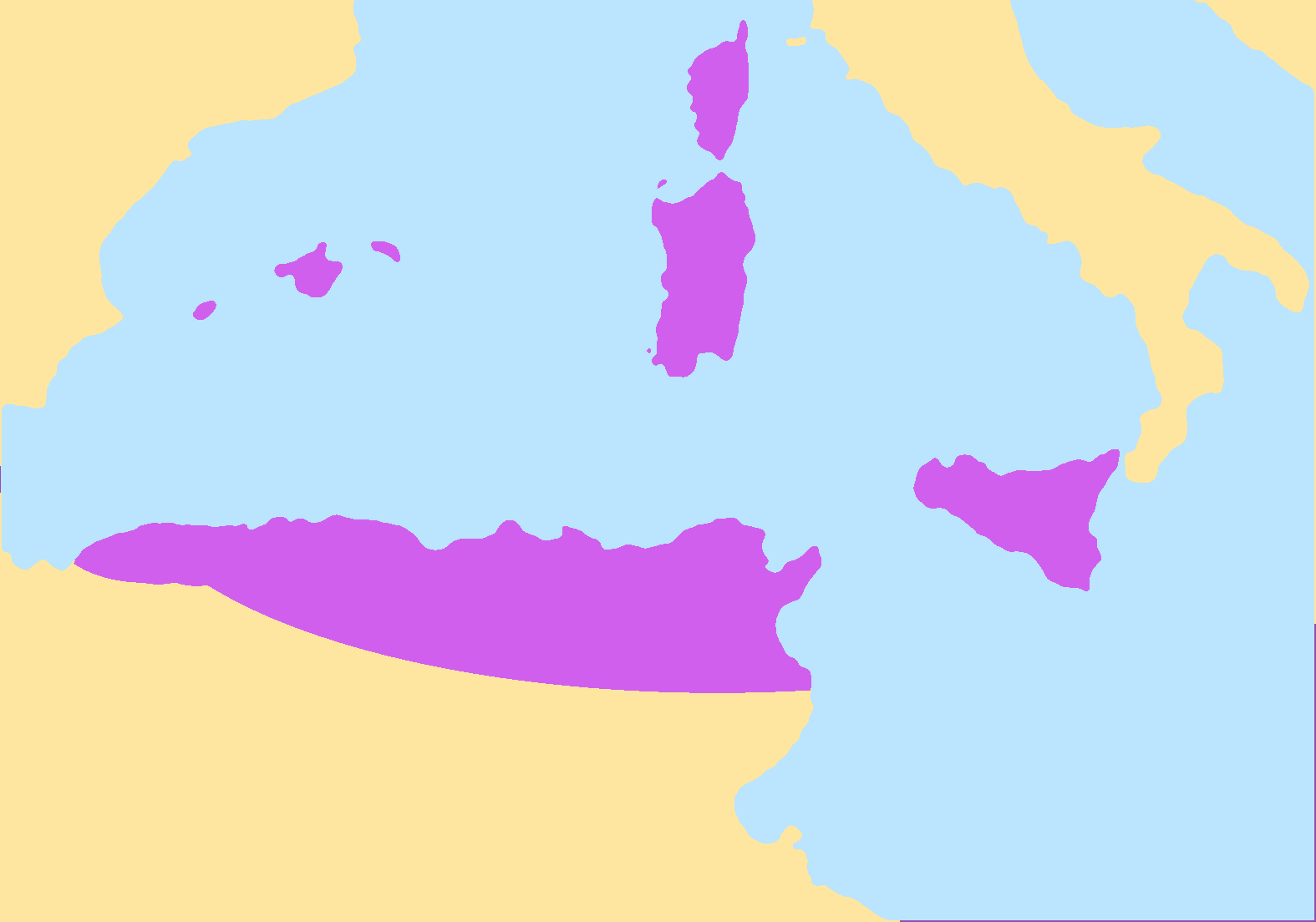
The Vandal Kingdom at its maximum extent in the 470s

Leo's reign was also noteworthy for his influence in the Western Roman Empire, marked by his appointment of Anthemius as Western Roman emperor in 467. He attempted to build on this political achievement with an expedition against the Vandals in 468. 1,113 ships carrying 100,000 men participated in the expedition, which ended in defeat because of bad leadership from Leo's brother-in-law Basiliscus. This disaster drained the Empire of men and money. Procopius estimated the costs of the expedition to be 130,000 pounds of gold; John the Lydian estimated the costs to be 65,000 pounds of gold and 750,000 pounds of silver.

In 472, Leo issued an edict which stipulated that high-ranking officers who permitted pagan sacrifices on their land were to be demoted and have their possessions confiscated. Lower-ranking offenders were to be tortured and condemned to labour in the mines.

Leo died of dysentery at the age of 73 on 18 January 474.

== Marriage and children ==
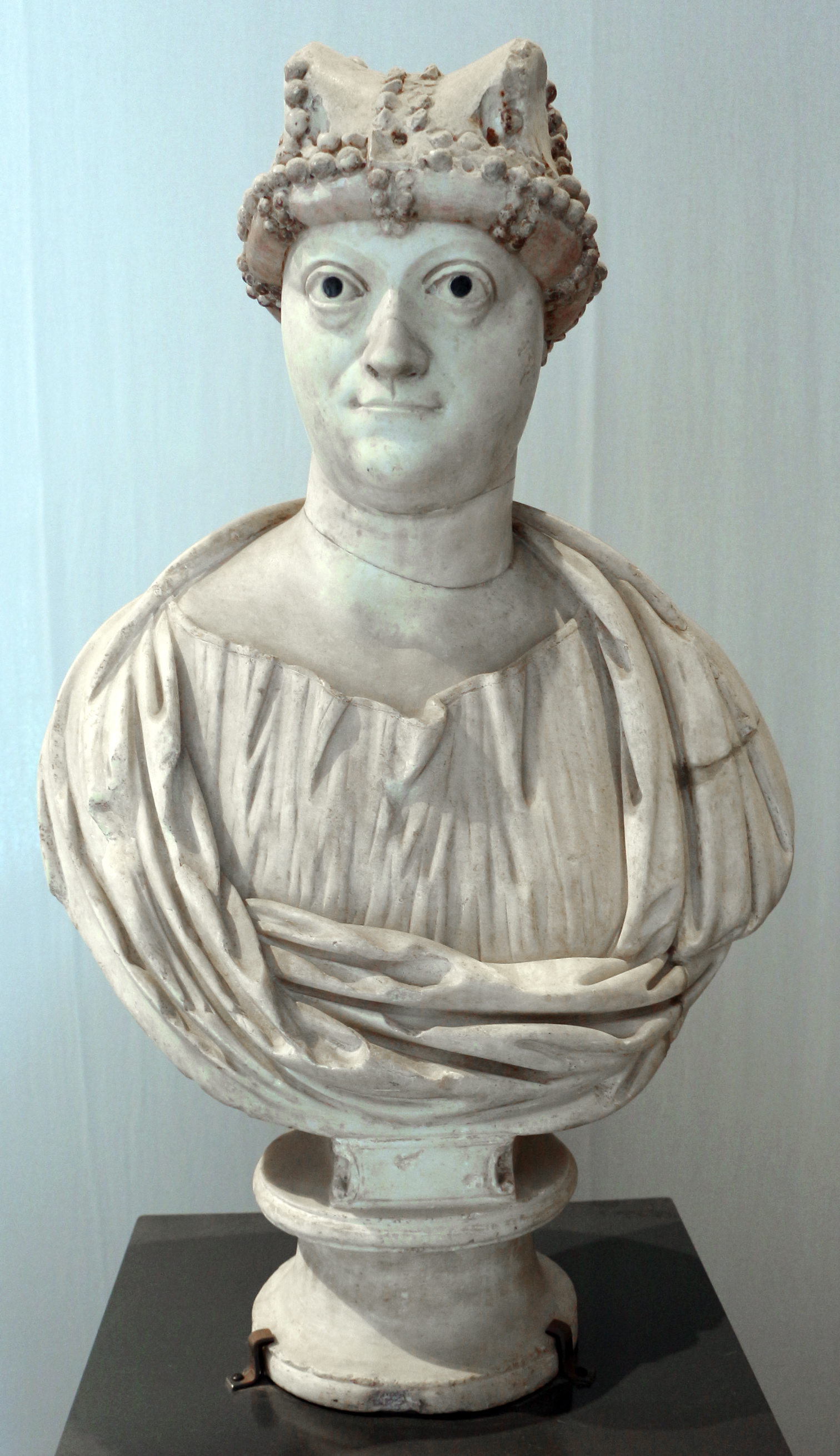
Probable portrait head of Ariadne on an antique but unrelated bust, Museo della Basilica di S. Giovanni in Laterano

Leo and Verina had three children. Their eldest daughter Ariadne was born prior to the death of Marcian (reigned 450–457). Ariadne had a younger sister, Leontia. Leontia was first betrothed to Patricius, a son of Aspar, but their engagement was probably annulled when Aspar and another of his sons, Ardabur, were assassinated in 471. Leontia then married Marcian, a son of Emperor Anthemius and Marcia Euphemia. The couple led a failed revolt against Zeno in 478–479. They were exiled to Isauria following their defeat.

An unknown son was born in 463. He died five months following his birth. The only sources about him are a horoscope by Rhetorius and a hagiography of Daniel the Stylite.

The Georgian Chronicle, a 13th-century compilation drawing from earlier sources, reports a marriage of Vakhtang I of Iberia to Princess Helena of Byzantium, identifying her as a daughter of the predecessor of Zeno. This predecessor was probably Leo I, the tale attributing a third daughter to Leo. Cyril Toumanoff identified two children of this marriage: Mithridates of Iberia; and Leo of Iberia. This younger Leo was father of Guaram I of Iberia. The accuracy of the descent is unknown.

== See also ==
- Church of St. Mary of the Spring (Istanbul)
- Life-giving Spring
- List of Byzantine emperors

== Sources ==
- Ostrogorsky, George (1956). History of the Byzantine State. Oxford: Basil Blackwell.
- Bury, John Bagnell (1958). History of the Later Roman Empire: from the death of Theodosius I to the death of Justinian. Dover books. Vol. 1. Dover Publications.
- Friell, Gerard (1998). The Rome That Did Not Fall: The Survival of the East in the Fifth Century. Ancient history. London: Taylor & Francis. ISBN 978-0-415-15403-1.
- Meyendorff, John (1989). Imperial unity and Christian divisions: The Church 450–680 A.D. The Church in history. Vol. 2. Crestwood, NY: St. Vladimir's Seminary Press. ISBN 978-0-88-141056-3.
- Thomas F. Madden (Presenter) (2006). Empire of Gold: A History of the Byzantine Empire; Lecture 2: Justinian and the Reconquest of the West, 457–565 (Audio book). Prince Frederick: Recorded Books. ISBN 978-1-4281-3267-2.
- Martindale, John R., ed. (1980). The Prosopography of the Later Roman Empire: Volume II, AD 395–527. Cambridge: Cambridge University Press. p. 663. ISBN 0-521-20159-4.
- Kazhdan, A. P.; Talbot, Alice-Mary Maffry; Cutler, Anthony; Gregory, Timothy E.; Ševčenko, Nancy Patterson, eds. (1991). The Oxford Dictionary of Byzantium. New York: Oxford University Press. p. 1206. ISBN 978-0-19-504652-6.
- Williams, Stephen; Friell, Gerard (1999). The Rome that Did Not Fall: The Survival of the East in the Fifth Century. London ; New York: Routledge. ISBN 978-0-415-15403-1.
- Rösch, Gerhard (1978). Onoma Basileias: Studien zum offiziellen Gebrauch der Kaisertitel in spätantiker und frühbyzantinischer Zeit. Byzantina et Neograeca Vindobonensia (in German). Verlag der österreichischen Akademie der Wissenschaften. ISBN 978-3-7001-0260-1.

Leo I (emperor) Leonid dynasty Born: 400 / 401 Died: 18 January 474
Regnal titles
Preceded by Marcian	Eastern Roman emperor 457–474	Succeeded by Leo II
Political offices
Preceded by Constantinus; Rufus	Roman consul 458 with Majorian Augustus	Succeeded by Ricimer; Patricius
Preceded by Severinus; Dagalaifus	Roman consul 462 with Libius Severus Augustus	Succeeded by Caecina Decius Basilius; Vivianus
Preceded by Hermenericus; Basiliscus	Roman consul 466 with Tatianus (Gallia)	Succeeded by Pusaeus; Iohannes
Preceded by Messius Phoebus Severus; Iordanes	Roman consul 471 with Caelius Aconius Probianus	Succeeded by Rufius Postumius Festus; Marcianus
Preceded by Rufius Postumius Festus; Marcianus	Roman consul 473	Succeeded by Leo junior Augustus
