= Leontia Porphyrogenita =

Daughter of Emperor Leo I

Leontia (Greek: Λεοντία, 457 – after 479) was the daughter of the Eastern Roman Emperor Leo I.

== Biography ==
Leontia was the daughter of Emperor Leo I and his wife Verina; she was younger sister of Ariadne, but, unlike her, she could claim to be porphyrogenita, "born in the purple", because she was born during the first year of reign of her father (457).

Leo, who ascended the throne for military merits and had no family ties with the Roman aristocracy, used the marriage of his daughters to strengthen his position: as Ariadne had been married to the Isaurian general Zeno, the marriage of Leontia was designed to bind him to the other component of the army, the Germanic one represented by the Alan magister militum Aspar. It happened, however, that at the announcement of the marriage between the son of Aspar, Julius Patricius, and Leontia popular riots broke out (470): for the clergy and people of Constantinople it was in fact not acceptable for an Arian as Patricius to have the possibility of becoming emperor. The riots stopped only when Aspar and Leo promised to the bishops that Patricius would convert to Orthodoxy before becoming emperor, and that only after the conversion he would have married Leontia.

In 471 Julius Patricius disappears from the chronicles: his father Aspar and his brother Ardabur were murdered in this year by order of Leo. Leontia was then married to Marcian, the son of the Western Emperor Anthemius: the marriage linked the two royal houses of the West and the East. However, in 472 Anthemius died and was succeeded by Olybrius, and with Leo's death in 474, Zeno ascended to the throne of the East. Ousted from both thrones, Marcianus and Leontia plotted a revolt against Zeno in 479, which was based on Leontia's right of precedence over her sister as porphyrogenita. However, the revolt was quelled.

== Bibliography ==
- Alemany, Agustí, Sources on the Alans: A Critical Compilation, Brill Academic Publishers, 2000, ISBN 90-04-11442-4, p. 114.
- Amory, Patrick, People and Identity in Ostrogothic Italy, 489-554, Cambridge University Press, 1997, ISBN 0-521-52635-3, p. 284, 288.
- Bury, John Bagnall, "X.1 Leo I (A.D. 457‑474)", History of the Later Roman Empire, 1958, Dover Books, pp. 389–395
- Thiele, Andreas, Erzählende genealogische Stammtafeln zur europäischen Geschichte Band III Europäische Kaiser-, Königs- und Fürstenhäuser Ergänzungsband, R.G. Fischer Verlag 1994 Tafel 490
- Williams, Stephen, The Rome That Did Not Fall: the survival of the East in the fifth century, Routledge, 1999, ISBN 0-415-15403-0, p. 180.
