= Anthemiolus =

Son of Emperor Anthemius

- Born: Unknown
- Died: c. 471 AD; Near Arelate, Gaul
- Relatives: Anthemius (father), Marcia Euphemia (mother), Marcian (grandfather)
- Military career
- Allegiance: Western Roman Empire
- Conflicts: Conflict against the Visigoths

Anthemiolus (died c. 471 AD) was the son of the Western Roman Emperor Anthemius (467–472) and Marcia Euphemia, daughter of the Eastern Roman emperor Marcian.

== Name ==
His name means "little Anthemius" and is a diminutive of his and his father's name Anthemius, in order to distinguish them both.

== Life ==
His life is known only from the Chronica Gallica of 511. He was sent by his father to Gaul with a powerful army, accompanied by three generals — Thorisarius, Everdingus, and Hermianus — in order to oppose the Visigoths then occupying Provence and threatening to conquer the Auvergne. He and his generals were defeated by the Visigothic king Euric near Arles and all four of them lost their lives. The Chronica, in entry 649, states:

Antimolus a patre Anthemio imperatore cum Thorisario, Everdingo et Hermiano com. stabuli Arelate directus est, quibus rex Euricus trans Rhodanum occurrit occisisque ducibus omnia vastavit

Antimolus was sent by his father, Emperor Anthemius, to Arles, with Thorisarius, Everdingus and Hermanius, comes [or comites] stabuli: King Euric met them on the far side of the Rhone and, having killed the duces, laid everything waste.

According to the Chronica, this event falls between the succession of Euric (467) and the war between Anthemius and Ricimer (471–472). It can probably be further narrowed to the period when Anthemius is known to have been organising a concerted effort to remove the Visigoths from Gaul between 468 and 471, a period during which an army led by the Briton Riothamus was defeated near Déols. It is not impossible that Anthemiolus' army was sent to reinforce Riothamus and that Euric defeated both forces in turn, probably in either 470 or 471.

== Sources ==
- Burgess, R. "The Gallic Chronicle of 511: A New Critical Edition with a Brief Introduction." Society and Culture in Late Antique Gaul: Revisiting the Sources. edd. R. W. Mathisen and D. Shantzer. Aldershot, 2001. pp. 85–100.
- Barnwell, P.S. "Emperors, Prefects & Kings: The Roman West, 395-565". University of North Carolina Press, 1992. pp. 38
