= Ostrogothic Kingdom =

493–553 kingdom centered in Italy

Kingdom of Italy Regnum Italiae (Latin)
- 493–553
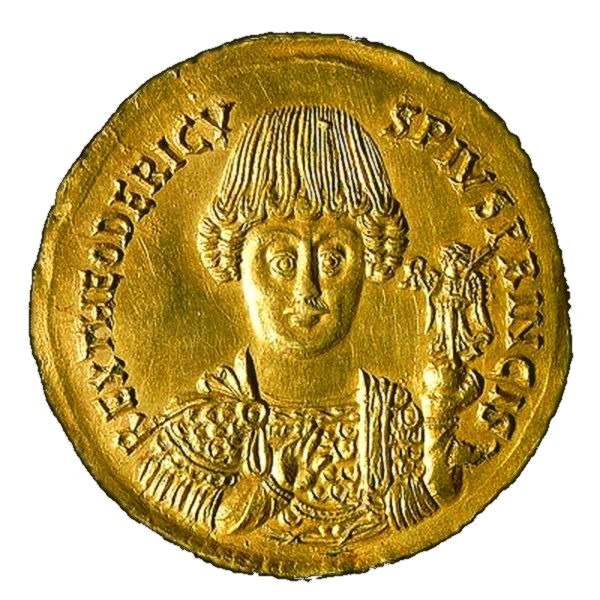
- Ostrogoth coin depicting Theodoric the Great

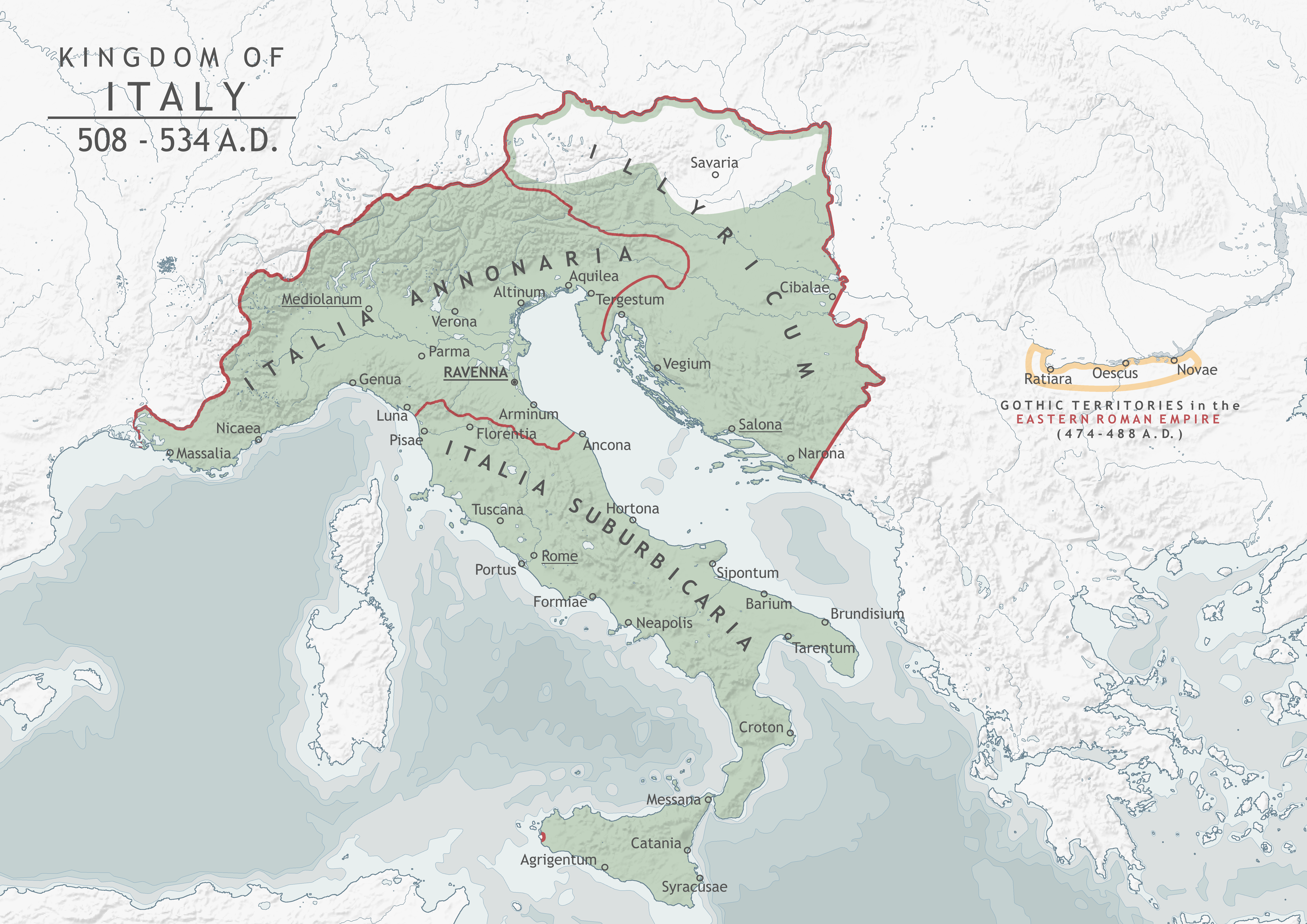
- The Ostrogothic Kingdom between 508 and 534 AD
- Capital: Ravenna (493–540); Pavia (540–553)
- Common languages: Gothic, Vulgar Latin, Pannonian Latin
- Religion: Official: Arian Christianity; Chalcedonian Christianity; Minority: Judaism; Pelagian Christianity; Roman Paganism; Manichaeism
- Government: Monarchy
- King
  - 493–526: Theodoric (first)
  - 552–553: Teia (last)
- Legislature: Roman Senate
- Historical era: Late antiquity
  - Battles of Isonzo and Verona: 489
  - Fall of Ravenna: 493
  - Start of the Gothic War: 535
  - Battle of Mons Lactarius: 553
Preceded by
Kingdom of Odoacer
Hunnic Empire
Succeeded by
Byzantine Empire under the Justinian dynasty
Exarchate of Ravenna
Duchy of Rome
Avar Khaganate

The Ostrogothic Kingdom, officially the Kingdom of Italy (Latin: Regnum Italiae), was a barbarian kingdom established by the Germanic Ostrogoths that controlled Italy and neighbouring areas between 493 and 553. Led by Theodoric the Great, the Ostrogoths killed Odoacer, a Germanic soldier and erstwhile leader of the foederati. Odoacer had previously become the de facto ruler of Italy following Odoacer's deposition of Romulus Augustulus, the final emperor of the Western Roman Empire, in 476. Under Theodoric, the Ostrogothic kingdom reached its zenith, stretching from Southern France in the west to Western Serbia in the southeast. Most of the social institutions of the late Western Roman Empire were preserved during his rule. Theodoric called himself "King of the Goths and Romans" (Latin: Gothorum Romanorumque Rex), demonstrating his desire to be a leader for both peoples.

After Theodoric, several other Ostrogoths ruled Italy for shorter periods of time, of which the first ones were still members of the Amal dynasty like Theodoric. Under Justinian I, however, the Byzantine Empire embarked on a campaign to reconquer Italy in 535. Witiges, who was the Ostrogothic ruler at that time, could not defend the kingdom successfully and was captured when the capital Ravenna fell. The Ostrogoths rallied around a new leader, Totila, and largely managed to reverse the conquest, but were eventually defeated. The last king of the Ostrogothic Kingdom was Teia.

== History ==
=== Background ===
==== Ostrogoths ====
The Ostrogoths were the eastern branch of the Goths. They settled and established a powerful state in Dacia, but during the late 4th century, they came under the dominion of the Huns. After the collapse of the Hunnic empire in 454, large numbers of Ostrogoths were settled by Emperor Marcian in the Roman province of Pannonia as foederati. Unlike most other foederati formations, the Goths were not absorbed into the structure and traditions of the Roman military but retained a strong identity and cohesion of their own. In 460, during the reign of Leo I, because the payment of annual sums had ceased, they ravaged Illyricum. Peace was concluded in 461, whereby the young Theodoric Amal, son of Theodemir of the Amals, was sent as a hostage to Constantinople, where he received a Roman education.

In previous years, a large number of Goths, first under Aspar and then under Theodoric Strabo, had entered service in the Roman army and were a significant political and military power in the court of Constantinople. The period 477–483 saw a complex three-way struggle among Theodoric the Amal, who had succeeded his father in 474, Theodoric Strabo, and the new Eastern Emperor Zeno. In this conflict, alliances shifted regularly, and large parts of the Balkans were devastated by it.

In the end, after Strabo's death in 481, Zeno came to terms with Theodoric. Parts of Moesia and Dacia ripensis were ceded to the Goths, and Theodoric was named magister militum praesentalis and consul for 484. Barely a year later, Theodoric and Zeno fell out, and again Theodoric's Goths ravaged Thrace. It was then that the thought occurred to Zeno and his advisors to direct Theodoric against another troublesome neighbour of the Empire – the Italian kingdom of Odoacer.

==== Kingdom of Odoacer (476–493) ====
In 476, Odoacer, leader of the foederati in the West, had staged a coup against the rebellious magister militum Orestes, who was seeking to have his son Romulus Augustulus recognized as Western Emperor in place of Emperor Julius Nepos. Orestes had reneged on the promise of land in Italy for Odoacer's troops, a pledge made to ensure their neutrality in his attack on Nepos. After executing Orestes and putting the teenage usurper in internal exile, Odoacer paid nominal allegiance to Nepos (now in Dalmatia) while effectively operating autonomously, having been raised to the rank of patrician by Zeno. Odoacer retained the Roman administrative system, cooperated actively with the Roman Senate, and his rule was efficient and successful. He evicted the Vandals from Sicily in 477, and in 480 he occupied Dalmatia after the murder of Julius Nepos.

=== Conquest of Italy by the Goths (488–493) ===
An agreement was reached between Zeno and Theodoric, stipulating that Theodoric, if victorious, was to rule in Italy as the emperor's representative. Theodoric with his people set out from Moesia in the autumn of 488, passed through Dalmatia and crossed the Julian Alps into Italy in late August 489. The first confrontation with the army of Odoacer was at the river Isonzo (the battle of Isonzo) on August 28. Odoacer was defeated and withdrew towards Verona, where a month later another battle was fought, resulting in a bloody, but crushing, Gothic victory.

Odoacer fled to his capital at Ravenna, while the larger part of his army under Tufa surrendered to the Goths. Theodoric then sent Tufa and his men against Odoacer, but he changed his allegiance again and returned to Odoacer. In 490, Odoacer was thus able to campaign against Theodoric, take Milan and Cremona and besiege the main Gothic base at Ticinum (Pavia). At that point, however, the Visigoths intervened, the siege of Ticinum was lifted, and Odoacer was decisively defeated at the river Adda on 11 August 490. Odoacer fled again to Ravenna, while the Senate and many Italian cities declared themselves for Theodoric.

==== Theodoric kills Odoacer (493) ====
The Goths now turned to besiege Ravenna, but since they lacked a fleet and the city could be resupplied by sea, the siege could be endured almost indefinitely, despite privations. It was not until 492 that Theodoric was able to procure a fleet and capture Ravenna's harbours, thus entirely cutting off communication with the outside world. The effects of this appeared six months later, when, with the mediation of the city's bishop, negotiations started between the two parties.

An agreement was reached on 25 February 493, whereby the two should divide Italy between them. A banquet was organised in order to celebrate this treaty. It was at this banquet, on March 15, that Theodoric, after making a toast, killed Odoacer with his own hands. A general massacre of Odoacer's soldiers and supporters followed. Theodoric and his Goths were now masters of Italy.

=== Reign of Theodoric the Great (493–526) ===
==== Theodoric's rule ====
"... Theodoric was a man of great distinction and of good-will towards all men, and he ruled for thirty-three years. Under his rule, Italy for thirty years enjoyed such good fortune that his successors also inherited peace. For whatever he did was good. He so governed two races at the same time, Romans and Goths, that although he himself was of the Arian sect, he nevertheless made no assault on the Catholic religion; he gave games in the circus and the amphitheatre, so that even by the Romans he was called a Trajan or a Valentinian, whose times he took as a model; and by the Goths, because of his edict, in which he established justice, he was judged to be in all respects their best king."
Anonymus Valesianus, Excerpta II 59–60

Like Odoacer, Theodoric was ostensibly a patricius and subject of the emperor in Constantinople, acting as his viceroy for Italy, a position recognized by the new Emperor Anastasius in 497. At the same time, he was the king of his own people, who were not Roman citizens. In reality, he acted as an independent ruler, although unlike Odoacer, he meticulously preserved the outward forms of his subordinate position.

The administrative machinery of Odoacer's kingdom, in essence that of the former Empire, was more or less retained by the Ostrogoths. According to the analysis of Jonathan J. Arnold, Theodoric presented himself – and was more or less accepted as – a Roman emperor. But despite this rhetoric, Italy had undergone significant structural changes in the fifth century, which required that Roman administrative traditions had to be adapted by Theodoric's court. The Senate continued to function normally and was consulted on civil appointments, and the laws of the Empire were still recognized as ruling the Roman population, though Goths were ruled under their own traditional laws. Indeed, as a subordinate ruler, Theodoric did not possess the right to issue his own laws (leges) in the system of Roman law, but merely edicts (edicta), or clarifications on certain details.

The continuity in administration is illustrated by the fact that several senior ministers of Odoacer, like Liberius and Cassiodorus the Elder, were retained in the new kingdom's top positions. The close cooperation between Theodoric and the Roman elite began to break down in later years, especially after the healing of the ecclesiastical rift between Rome and Constantinople (see below), as leading senators conspired with the Emperor. This resulted in the arrest and execution of the magister officiorum Boethius and his father-in-law, Symmachus, in 524.

On the other hand, the army and all military offices remained the exclusive preserve of the Goths. The Goths were settled mostly in northern Italy, and kept themselves largely apart from the Roman population, a tendency reinforced by their different faiths: the Goths were mostly Homoian Christians (''Arians"), while the people they ruled over were adherents of Chalcedonian Christianity. Despite this fact, Theoderic enjoyed good relations with the Roman church, although questions of relative jurisdiction, especially in controversies involving clerics, remained potentially fraught. Jews in Theoderic's kingdom were both disadvantaged and protected as they had been under Roman law, which among other things, provided legal protections for their places of worship. Theodoric's view was clearly expressed in his letters to the Jews of Genoa: "The true mark of civilitas is the observance of law. It is this which makes life in communities possible, and which separates man from the brutes. We therefore gladly accede to your request that all the privileges which the foresight of antiquity conferred upon the Jewish customs shall be renewed to you..." and "We cannot order a religion, because no one can be forced to believe against his will."

==== Relations with the Germanic states of the West ====
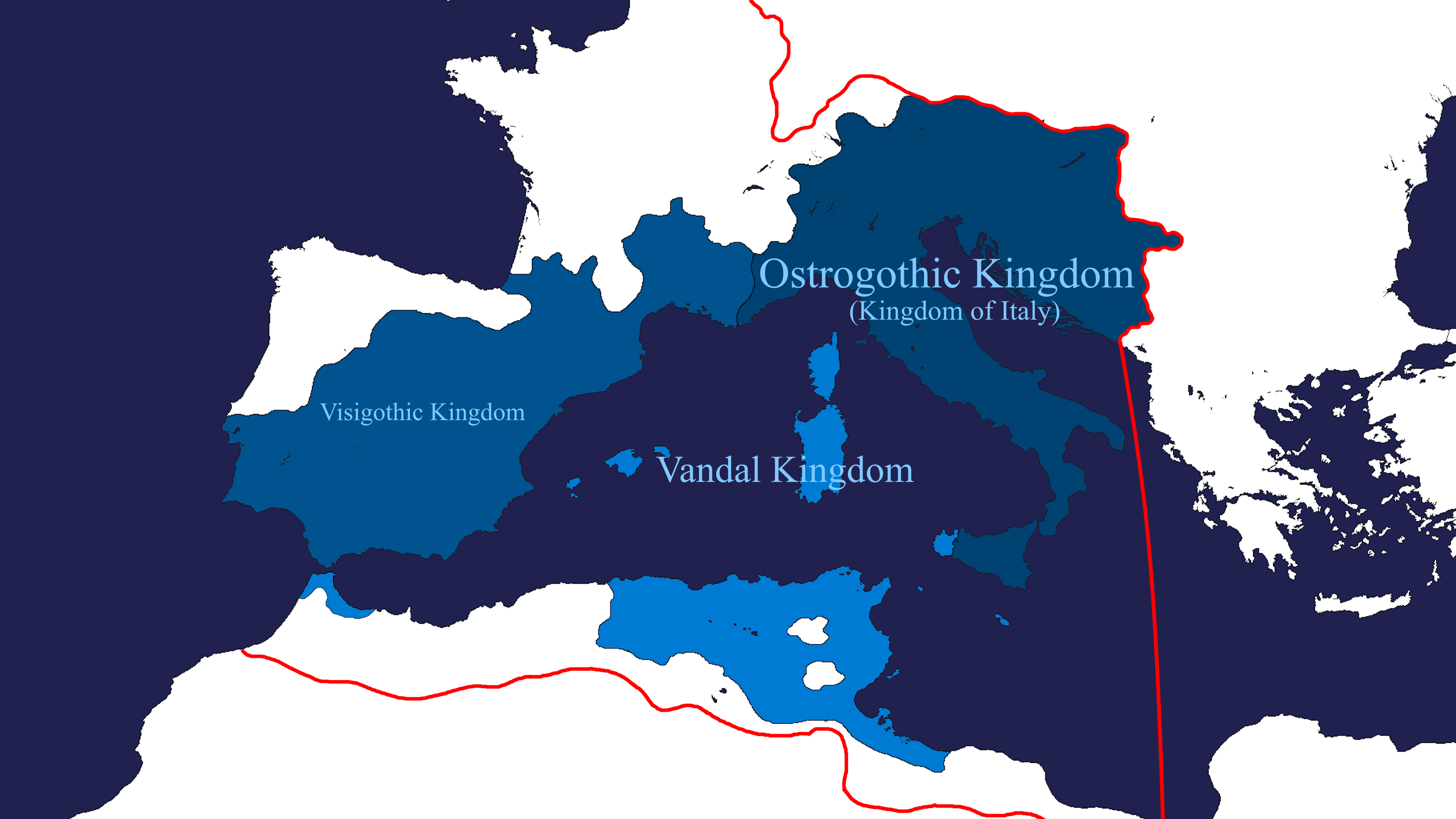
Theodoric's empire at the height of its power in 523, with territory marked in blue ruled directly by Theodoric and light blue areas under his hegemony

It is in his foreign policy rather than domestic affairs that Theodoric appeared and acted as an independent ruler. By means of marriage alliances, he sought to establish a central position among the barbarian states of the West. As Jordanes states: "...there was no race left in the western realms which Theodoric had not befriended or brought into subjection during his lifetime." This was in part meant as a defensive measure, and in part as a counterbalance to the influence of the Empire. His daughters were wedded to the Visigothic king Alaric II and the Burgundian prince Sigismund, his sister Amalfrida married the Vandal king Thrasamund, while he himself married Audofleda, sister of the Frankish king Clovis I.

These policies were not always successful in maintaining peace: Theodoric found himself at war with Clovis when the latter attacked the Visigoth dominions in Gaul in 506. The Franks were rapidly successful, killing Alaric in the Battle of Vouillé and subduing Aquitania by 507. However, starting in 508, Theodoric's generals campaigned in Gaul, and were successful in saving Septimania for the Visigoths, as well as extending Ostrogothic rule into southern Gaul (Provence) at the expense of the Burgundians. There in 510 Theodoric reestablished the defunct praetorian prefecture of Gaul. Now Theodoric had a common border with the Visigothic kingdom, where, after Alaric's death, he also ruled as regent of his infant grandson Amalaric.

Family bonds also served little with Sigismund, who as a staunch Chalcedonian Christian cultivated close ties to Constantinople. Theodoric perceived this as a threat and intended to campaign against him, but the Franks acted first and invaded Burgundy in 523, quickly subduing it. Theodoric could only react by expanding his domains in the Provence north of the river Durance up to the Isère.

The peace with the Vandals, secured in 500 with the marriage alliance with Thrasamund, and their common interests as Arian powers against Constantinople, collapsed after Thrasamund's death in 523. His successor Hilderic showed favour to the Nicaean Christians, and when Amalfrida protested, he had her and her entourage murdered. Theodoric was preparing an expedition against him when he died.

==== Relations with the Empire ====
"It behoves us, most clement Emperor, to seek for peace, since there are no causes for anger between us. [...] Our royalty is an imitation of yours, modelled on your good purpose, a copy of the only Empire; and insofar as we follow you do we excel all other nations. Often you have exhorted me to love the senate, to accept cordially the laws of past emperors, to join together in one all the members of Italy. [...] There is moreover that noble sentiment, love for the city of Rome, from which two princes, both of whom govern in her name, should never be disjoined."
Letter of Theodoric to Anastasius
Cassiodorus, Variae I.1

Theodoric's relations with his nominal suzerain, the Eastern Roman Emperor, were always strained, for political as well as for religious reasons. Especially during the reign of Anastasius, these led to several collisions, none of which however escalated into general warfare. In 504–505, Theodoric's forces launched a campaign to recover Pannonia and the strategically important town of Sirmium, formerly parts of the praetorian prefecture of Italy, which were now occupied by the Gepids.

The campaign was successful, but it also led to a brief conflict with imperial troops, where the Goths and their allies were victorious. Domestically, the Acacian schism between the patriarchates of Rome and Constantinople, caused by imperial support for the Henotikon, as well as Anastasius' Monophysite beliefs, played into Theodoric's hands, since the clergy and the Roman aristocracy of Italy, headed by Pope Symmachus, vigorously opposed them.

Thus, for a time, Theodoric could count on their support. The war between the Franks and Visigoths led to renewed friction between Theodoric and the Emperor, as Clovis successfully portrayed himself as the champion of the Western Church against the "heretical" Arian Goths, gaining the Emperor's support. This even led to the dispatch of a fleet by Anastasius in 508, which ravaged the coasts of Apulia.

With the accession of Justin I in 518, a more harmonious relationship seemed to be restored. Eutharic, Theodoric's son-in-law and designated successor, was appointed consul for the year 519, while in 522, to celebrate the healing of the Acacian schism, Justin allowed both consuls to be appointed by Theodoric. Soon, however, renewed tension would result from Justin's anti-Arian legislation, and tensions grew between the Goths and the Senate, whose members, as Chalcedonians, now shifted their support to the Emperor.

The suspicions of Theodoric were confirmed by the interception of compromising letters between leading senators and Constantinople, which led to the imprisonment and execution of Boethius in 524. Pope John I was sent to Constantinople to mediate on the Arians' behalf, and, although he achieved his mission, on his return he was imprisoned and died shortly after. These events further stirred popular sentiment against the Goths.

=== Death of Theodoric and dynastic disputes (526–535) ===
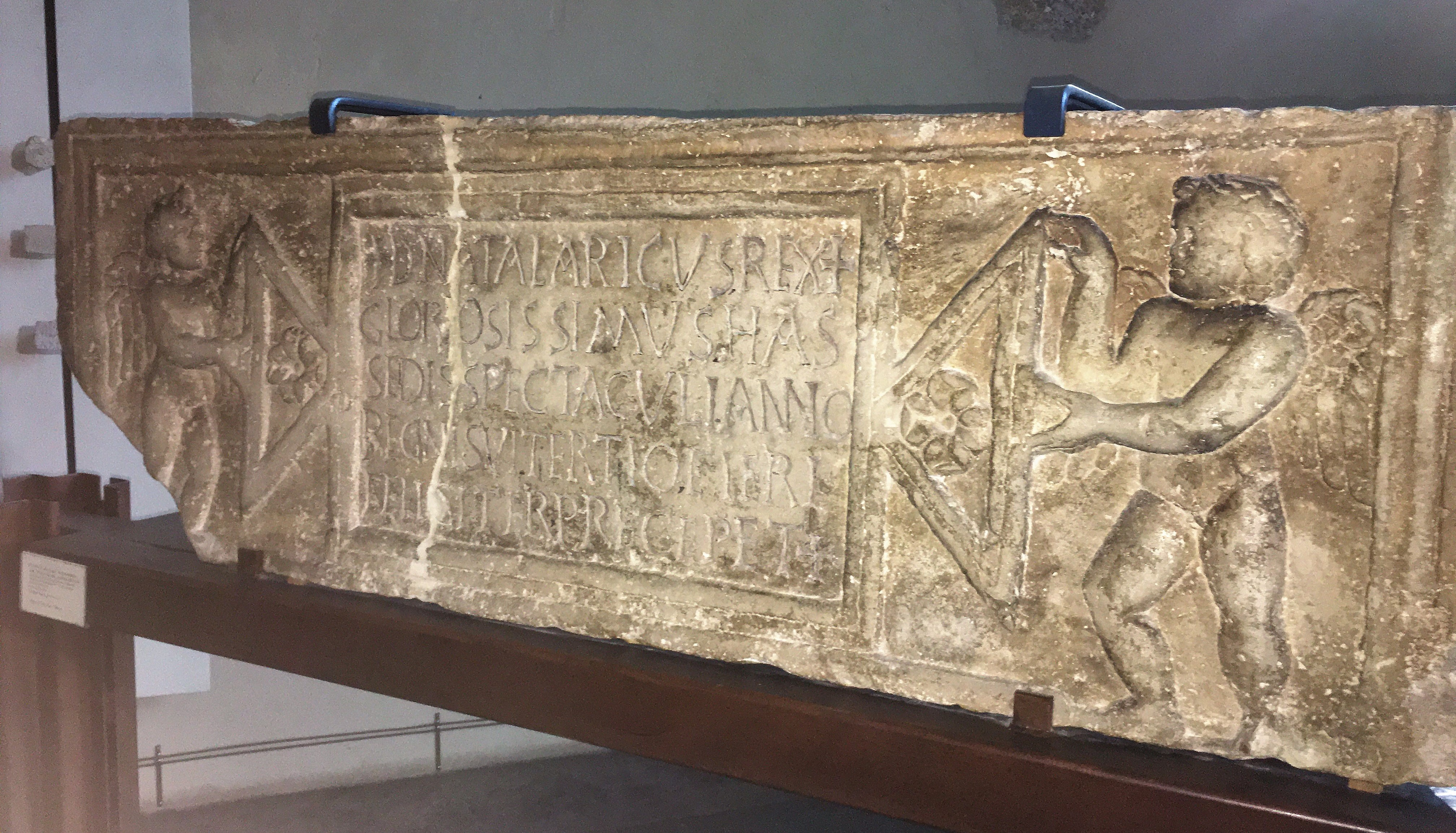
Epigraph originally placed at the Pavia amphitheater in which the restorations carried out between 528 and 529 by Athalaric at the amphitheater are mentioned, Pavia Civic Museums

After the death of Theodoric on 30 August 526, his achievements began to collapse. Since Eutharic had died in 523, Theodoric was succeeded by his infant grandson Athalaric, supervised by his mother, Amalasuntha, as regent. The lack of a strong heir caused the network of alliances that surrounded the Ostrogothic state to disintegrate: the Visigothic kingdom regained its autonomy under Amalaric, the relations with the Vandals turned increasingly hostile, and the Franks embarked again on expansion, subduing the Thuringians and the Burgundians and almost evicting the Visigoths from their last holdings in southern Gaul. The position of predominance which the Ostrogothic Kingdom had enjoyed under Theodoric in the West now passed irrevocably to the Franks.

This dangerous external climate was exacerbated by the regency's weak domestic position. Amalasuntha was Roman-educated and intended to continue her father's policies of conciliation between Goths and Romans. To that end, she actively courted the support of the Senate and the newly ascended Emperor Justinian I, even providing him with bases in Sicily during the Vandalic War. However, these ideas did not find much favour with the Gothic nobles, who in addition resented being ruled by a woman. They protested when she resolved to give her son a Roman education, preferring that Athalaric be raised as a warrior. She was forced to discharge his Roman tutors, but instead Athalaric turned to a life of dissipation and excess, which would send him to a premature death.

"[Amalasuntha] feared she might be despised by the Goths on account of the weakness of her sex. So after much thought she decided [...] to summon her cousin Theodahad from Tuscany, where he led a retired life at home, and thus she established him on the throne. But he was unmindful of their kinship and, after a little time, had her taken from the palace at Ravenna to an island of the Bulsinian lake where he kept her in exile. After spending a very few days there in sorrow, she was strangled in the bath by his hirelings."
Jordanes, Getica 306

Eventually, a conspiracy started among the Goths to overthrow her. Amalasuntha resolved to move against them, but as a precaution, she also made preparations to flee to Constantinople, and even wrote to Justinian asking for protection. In the event she managed to execute the three leading conspirators, and her position remained relatively secure until, in 533, Athalaric's health began to seriously decline.

Amalasuntha then turned for support to her only relative, her cousin Theodahad, while at the same time sending ambassadors to Justinian and proposing to cede Italy to him. Justinian indeed sent an able agent of his, Peter of Thessalonica, to carry out the negotiations, but before he had even crossed into Italy, Athalaric had died (on 2 October 534), Amalasuntha had crowned Theodahad as king in an effort to secure his support, and he had deposed and imprisoned her. Theodahad, who was of a peaceful disposition, immediately sent envoys to announce his ascension to Justinian and to reassure him of Amalasuntha's safety.

Justinian immediately reacted by offering his support to the deposed queen, but in early May 535, she was executed. This crime served as a perfect pretext for Justinian, fresh from his forces' victory over the Vandals, to invade the Gothic realm in retaliation. Theodahad tried to prevent the war, sending his envoys to Constantinople, but Justinian was already resolved to reclaim Italy. Only by renouncing his throne in the Empire's favour could Theodahad hope to avert war.

=== Gothic War and end of the Ostrogothic Kingdom (535–554) ===
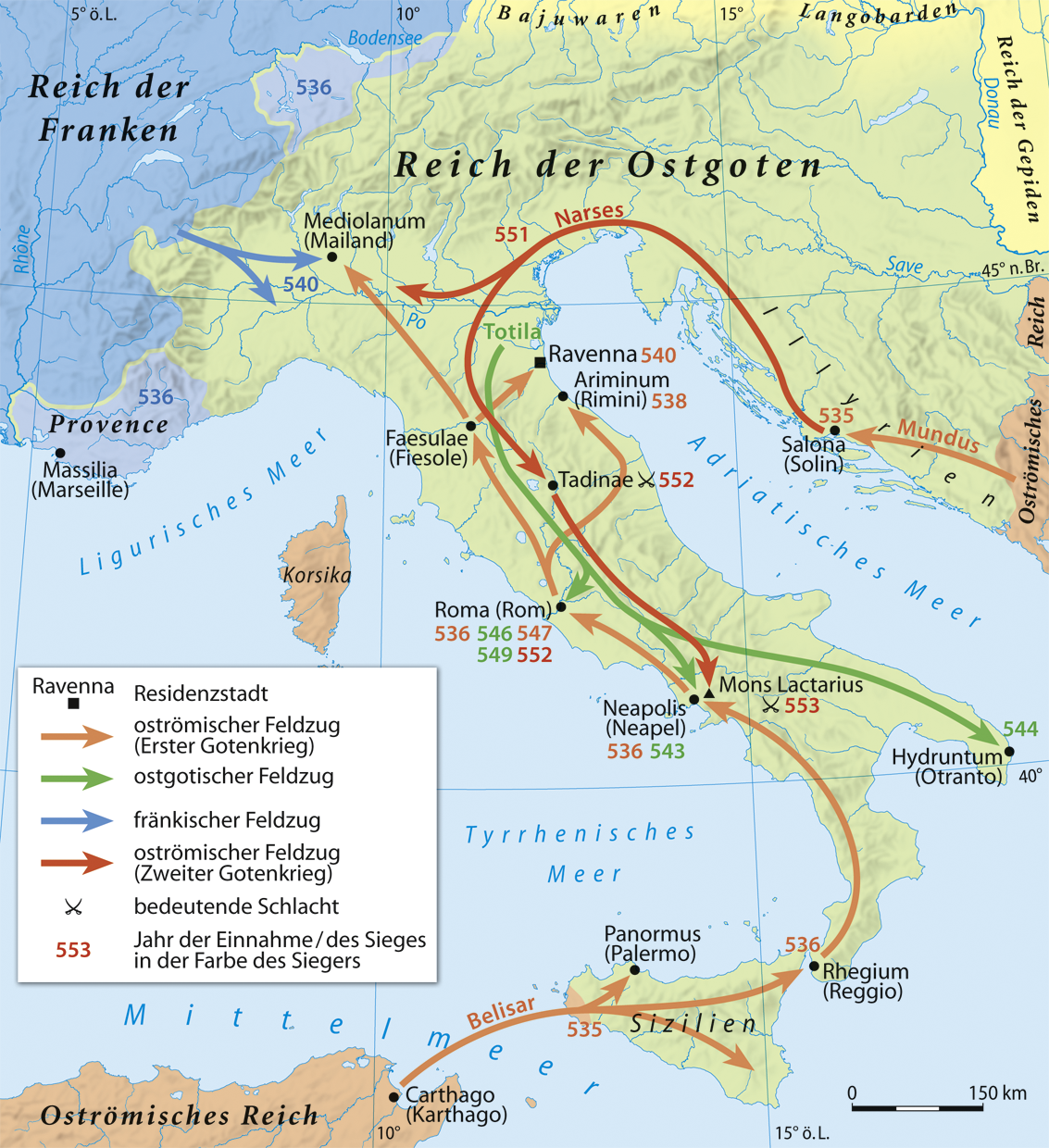
First and second Gothic war.

The Gothic War between the Eastern Roman Empire and the Ostrogothic Kingdom was fought from 535 until 554 in Italy, Dalmatia, Sardinia, Sicily and Corsica. It is commonly divided into two phases. The first phase lasted from 535 to 540 and ended with the fall of Ravenna and the apparent reconquest of Italy by the Byzantines. With the fall of Ravenna, the capital of the kingdom was brought to Pavia, which it became the last centres of Ostrogothic resistance that continued the war and opposed Eastern Roman rule.

During the second phase (540/541–553), Gothic resistance was reinvigorated under Totila and put down only after a long struggle by Narses in the Battle of Taginae and later in the Battle of Mons Lactarius. In 554, at the Battle of the Volturno, Narses also repelled a joint contingent of Franks and Alemanni, who had been invited by the Goths. In the same year, Justinian promulgated the Pragmatic Sanction which prescribed Italy's new government. The lands and cities across the River Po were still held by Franks and Goths, and it was not until 562 that their last strongholds, the cities of Verona and Brixia, were subjugated.

The war had its roots in the ambition of Justinian to recover the provinces of the former Western Roman Empire, which had been lost to invading barbarian tribes in the previous century (the Migration Period). By the end of the conflict Italy was devastated and considerably depopulated. As a consequence, the victorious Byzantines found themselves unable to resist the invasion of the Lombards in 568, which resulted in the loss of large parts of the Italian Peninsula.

== Rulers ==
Image	Name	Reign	Succession & notes
	Valamir	468(?)-469	General; Served as a vassal to Attila and after Attila's death, defeated Dengizich in the Battle of Bassianae. Died after falling from his horse during a raid.
	Theodemir	469-475	Brother of Valamir; ruled alongside his brother until his death. Consolidated the remaining Gothic realms in Pannonia and was able to defend his realm from a Roman army in 469.
	Theodoric "the Great"	471-526	Son of Theodemir; Was taken as a hostage as a child by the Byzantine Empire and received a education in Constantinople during his formative years. At the behest of then emperor Zeno he began his invasion against Odoacer in 489 and was able to defeat and murder him in 493, making Theodoric king. He oversaw the rebuilding and restoration of several Roman cities, most notably Rome itself as well as several legal reforms. Died of natural causes.
	Athalaric	526-534	Son of Eutharic, a Iberian nobleman and Amalasuintha, a daughter of Theodoric. Was effectively controlled by his mother and was known for his hedonistic lifestyle. Died from complications from diabetes.
	Amalasuintha	534-535	Youngest daughter of Theodoric; De facto ruler since 526. Was killed by their cousin Theodahad.
	Theodahad	534-536	Cousin of Amalasuintha; Saw the beginning of the Gothic War. Was an unpopular ruler and was deposed and put to death by Vitiges.
	Vitiges	536-540	General; proclaimed king in opposition of Theodahad. Lost Rome in 538 and Ravenna in 540. Was captured by the Byzantines after the fall of Ravenna and remained a captive in Constantinople for the rest of his life.
	Ildibad	540-541	General; proclaimed king after the capture of Vitiges. Was able to rebuild the army as well and defeated the Byzantines at Treviso. Was murdered by his bodyguard at a royal banquet.
	Eraric "the Rugian"	541	Rugii commoner; was elected king by the Ostrogoths. Attempted to make peace with the Byzantines but was opposed by the Ostrogoths. Was murdered by the followers of Totila after a reign of five months.
	Totila	541-552	Cousin of Ildibad; proclaimed king in opposition to Eraric. Was able to recapture Naples in 543, and Rome in 546 and again in 550. Was killed in the Battle of Taginae.
	Teia	552	General; served as a second-in-command to Totila. Proclaimed king after Totila's death. Was killed in the Battle of Mons Lactarius. His death marks the end of the Ostrogothic Kingdom.

== Culture ==
=== Architecture ===
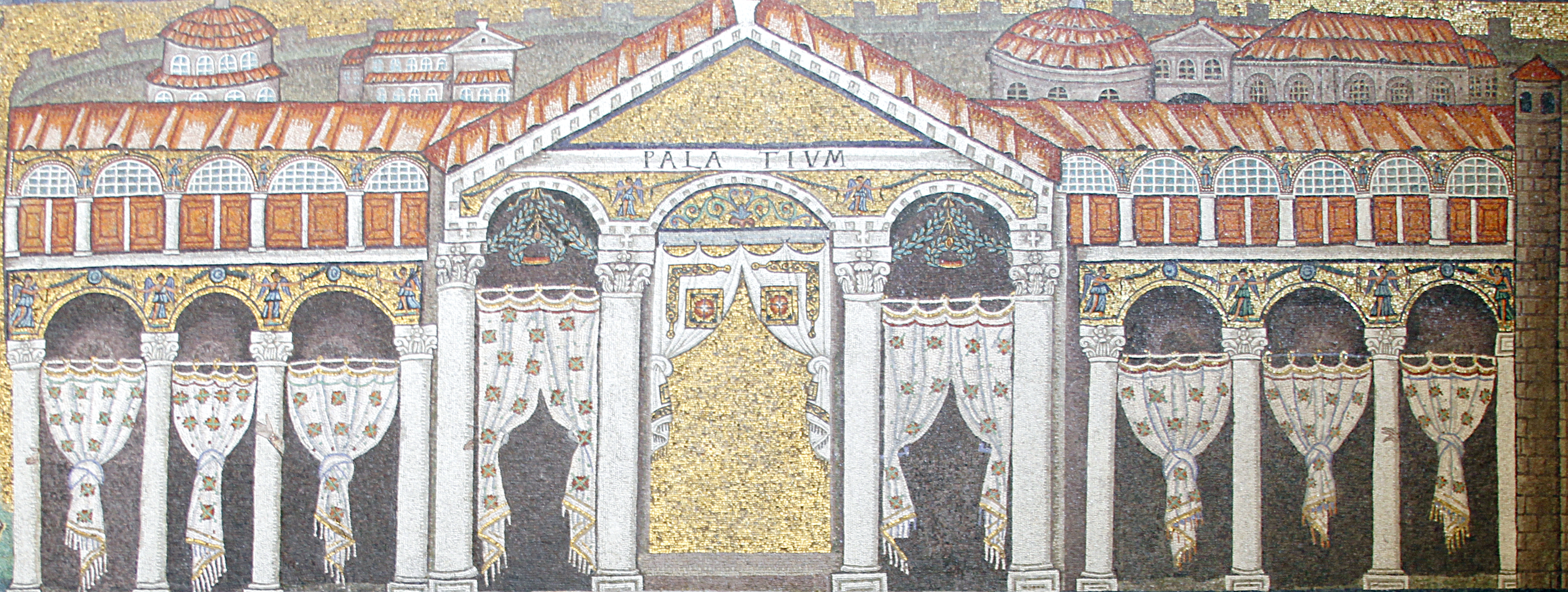
The Palace of Theodoric, as depicted on the walls of St. Apollinare Nuovo. The figures between the columns, representing Theodoric and his court, were removed after the East Roman conquest.

Because of the kingdom's short history, no fusion of the two peoples and their art was achieved. However, under the patronage of Theodoric and Amalasuntha, large-scale restoration of ancient Roman buildings was undertaken, and the tradition of Roman civic architecture continued. In Ravenna, new churches and monumental buildings were erected, several of which survive.

The Basilica of Sant'Apollinare Nuovo, its baptistry, and the Archiepiscopal Chapel follow the typical late Roman architectural and decorative motifs, but the Mausoleum of Theodoric displays purely Gothic elements, such as its construction not from the usual brick, but of massive slabs of Istrian limestone, or the 300-ton single-piece roof stone.

Maintenance, restoration, and in some cases new construction of functioning water systems in many cities outside of Ravenna also occurred in the Ostrogothic Kingdom. An official, the comes formarum was appointed to oversee the kingdom's aqueducts, which were of particular importance to Theodoric. Public bathing culture also continued in earnest under Ostrogothic administration, and there are numerous instances of Theodoric encouraging the practice through the restoration and construction of bathhouses in cities such as Verona and Pavia, and even subsidization of admission fees in the case of the public baths in Spoleto.

=== Literature ===
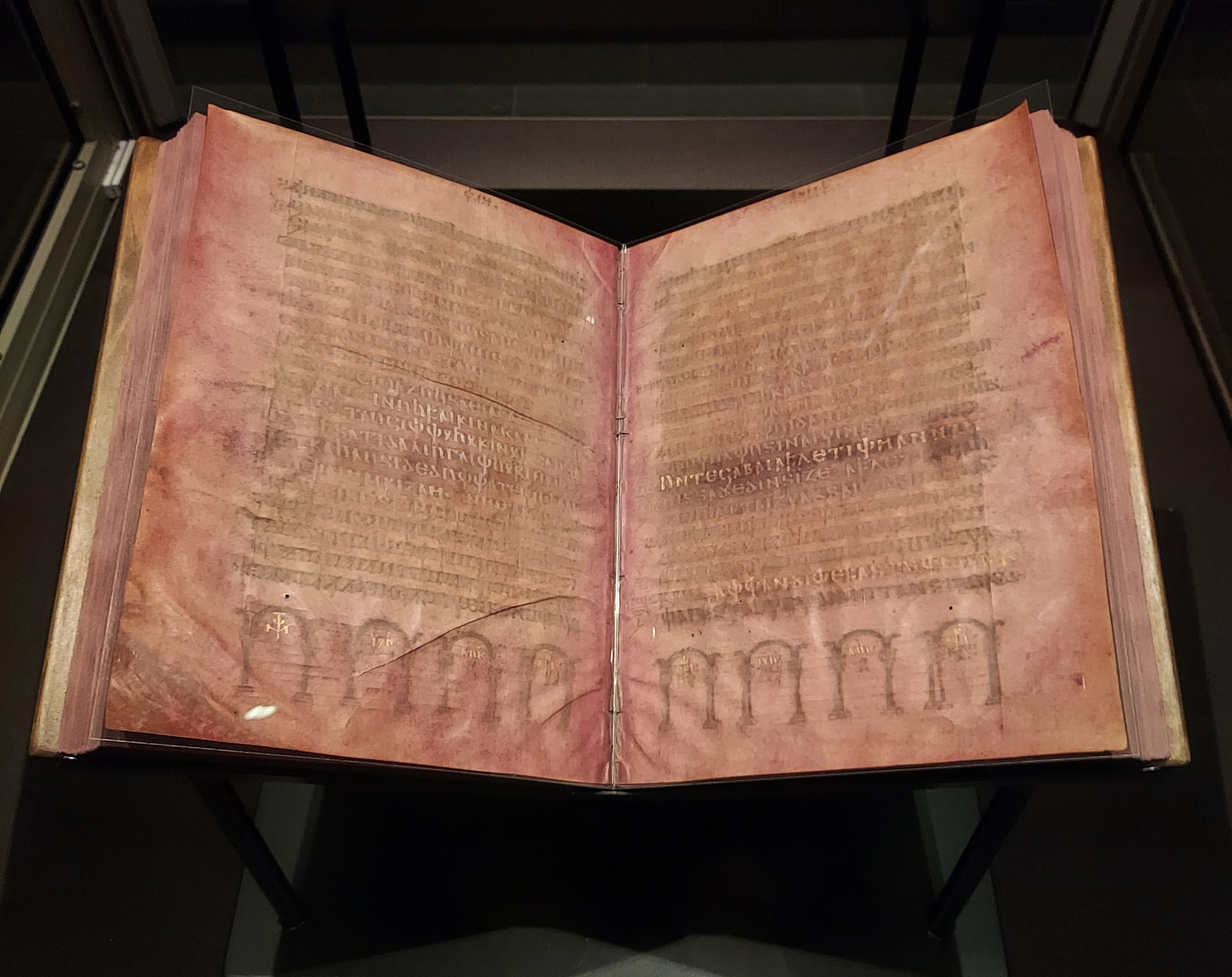
The Codex Argenteus, a 6th-century Gothic manuscript

Some older works were copied in Greek and Gothic (e.g. the Codex Argenteus), and the literature is solidly in the Greco-Roman tradition. Cassiodorus, hailing from a distinguished background, and himself entrusted with high offices (consul and magister officiorum) represents the Roman ruling class. Like many others of his background, he served Theodoric and his heirs loyally and well, something expressed in the writings of the period.

In his Chronica, used later by Jordanes in his Getica, as well as in the various panegyrics written by him and other prominent Romans of the time for the Gothic kings, Roman literary and historical tradition is put in the service of their Gothic overlords. His privileged position enabled him to compile the Variae Epistolae, a collection of state correspondence, which gives great insight into the inner workings of the Gothic state. Boethius is another prominent figure of the period. Well-educated and also from a distinguished family, he wrote works on mathematics, music and philosophy. His most famous work, Consolatio philosophiae, was written while imprisoned on charges of treason.

In Germanic languages, King Theodoric inspired countless legends of questionable veracity.

=== Population ===
Ostrogothic Italy between 489 and 553: Main area of Ostrogothic settlements. Ostrogothic kingdom before the conquest of Theodoric the Great.

Historians have proposed widely varying estimates for the population that accompanied Theodoric into Italy in 489 CE, ranging from approximately 100,000 to 250,000 individuals. The incoming Goths constituted a minority relative to the established Italo-Roman population, while maintaining a distinct political and social identity during the early Ostrogothic kingdom. Following the defeat of Odoacer, many of his former soldiers, drawn from groups such as the Sciri, Rugii, Heruli, Turcilingi, Alans, and other contingents, were integrated into the new political and military order. The Goths were particularly prominent in the western Po Valley, the Alpine region, and areas corresponding to modern Veneto, Trentino, Friuli and Marche. Major cities across northern and central Italy show evidence of Ostrogothic presence, including Milan, Tortona, Trento, Aquileia, and Rome, as well as in the locations that served as the seat of Theodoric’s court: Ravenna, Pavia, and Verona. Gothic military garrisons are also extensively documented further south, near Naples and in Campania. To these settlements, others were likely added in territories bordering Italy, such as Noricum, Dalmatia, and Provence.

Between 503 and 504, Theodoric the Great took the Alemanni, or at least the majority of them, under his protection and settled them in northern Italy and Raetia, particularly around the Lake Constance region and the Alpine Rhine, territories that were officially part of the Ostrogothic Kingdom of Italy, where they served as a frontier garrison against the Franks. For the same reason, between 523 and 526, he also ordered the relocation of much of the Gepid population in southern Pannonia to Provence. The 6th-century historian Procopius states that, following the Gothic War (535–554), the Ostrogoths and their allies were permitted to remain in Italy under Byzantine sovereignty. Subsequently, these Goths joined the Lombards during their invasion of Italy in 568 AD. (Note: De Bello Gothico IV 32, pp. 241–245; this reference stems from the pen of the Byzantine historian, Procopius, who accompanied Justinian's leading general, Belisarius, on his exploits between 527 and 540. This included the campaigns against the Ostrogoths, which is the subject of De Bello Gothico.)

Approximately fifty archaeological sites in Italy and Dalmatia have yielded richly furnished burials containing objects associated with the military and political elites of Ostrogothic Kingdom. Significant concentrations of these finds are distributed throughout the Picenum region, northern Samnium, the Po Valley, the areas around Ravenna, and the Alpine foothills. Although it is not possible to attribute these objects with certainty to well-defined ethnic groups, their presence at Italian sites remains compelling evidence that populations from the region between the Balkans and the Carpathians arrived on the peninsula. In those regions, in fact, such objects were produced and used as symbols of social rank among Germanic, Hunnic, and Alanic populations, as well as among groups of Pannonian and Thracian Goths (along with Rugians and Gepids) who, in 488, joined Theodoric in the conquest of Italy.

The settlement of Goths in the countryside does not appear to have been particularly disruptive to the existing population and much of the land on which Goths settled was likely requisitioned from Odoacer's men, not Romans. It has been hypothesized that, given the severe depopulation of Italy that began in the late classical period, the settlement of the Goths may have even been welcomed in many areas, which, from that point on, were cultivated and protected by a permanently stationed military element. These lands were located primarily in the Po Valley and in the Apennine region spanning Emilia, Umbria, and Tuscany. Once settled on the lands they had received, it is likely that the Ostrogothic aristocrats and free individuals further subdivided them, allocating portions of varying sizes to their relatives as well as to their own dependents, whether free or enslaved. Initially, most Goths lived confined to specific areas, remaining separate from the Italic populations and maintaining the characteristics of a closed, militarized group. However, contact between the Ostrogoths and the Italic population likely took place at the royal seats of Ravenna, Pavia, and Verona.

Goths and Romans enjoyed an equal status in the kingdom, but there was a strict legal dichotomy dictating their roles within society. Goths, who were charged with protecting the civil order of the kingdom, represented the military elite bound to service in times of peace and war, and were thus given the right to bear arms. Romans, who were themselves prohibited from carrying weapons, controlled the kingdom's civil administration and maintained their monopoly on trade and culture. The dual nature of the kingdom's society, in which Romans were responsible for maintaining civil society and Goths the military, ensured administrative stability, security, and cooperation of the two peoples now bound by mutual benefit.

Some have viewed the presence of blond hair and blue-eyes among ethnic Italians in the modern era as part of the Gothic (including Ostrogothic) and Lombardic legacy and a Germanic genetic footprint in Italy along with a cultural footprint, and that the Germanic Goths and later Lombards intermarried heavily with Mediterranean women. As one source states: “The traces of Gothic conquest were more permanent in Italy, and may be traced today in the blue eyes and fair hair of the Lombards. The unions of the virile northmen with the cultured women of imperial Rome gave birth to the spirit of chivalry, and from the fragments of the Roman Empire arose the feudalism of the Middle Ages.”

=== Economics and slavery ===
Villas that existed in the countryside would be abandoned or repurposed. Agriculture also became more diversified with woodland crops and animal husbandry becoming more common. Inland cities during the Ostrogothic period became more cut off from the outside world and became more reliant on local production areas. Cities along the Italian coast still received their trade from North Africa and places on the Eastern Mediterranean.

In the Ostrogothic Kingdom chattel slavery was practiced, primarily in rural areas, just as it had been in the Roman Empire. Slaves had a harsh life enjoying little rights or privileges and "could be transferred at will from one estate to another." A slave could be killed by their owner if they had sexual relations with a widow or caused a fire. They could not legally marry people and were not allowed to be assigned to peasants. Slavery would continue in Italy after the Ostrogoths.

The Ostrogothic Kingdom substantially protected landowners from violations of their property rights. There are numerous examples of the government intervening in instances in which smaller landowners' holdings were seized illegally by larger landholders and forcing the violators to compensate their victims. Surviving letters from the royal chancellery evidence the importance of protecting people of humble status (humiles) from those with wealth and power, in part due to the personal sympathies of Theodoric himself towards freeholders of lesser means.

== In popular culture ==
- The 1876 historical novel A Struggle for Rome by Felix Dahn (and its two-part screen adaptation in 1968 and 1969) focuses on the struggle among the Byzantines, the Ostrogoths and the native Italians over control of Italy after Theodoric's death.
- The 1938 historical novel Count Belisarius by Robert Graves describes the campaigns of the Byzantine general Belisarius to conquer the Ostrogothic Kingdom during the reign of Justinian.
- In the 1941 alternate history novel Lest Darkness Fall by L. Sprague de Camp, a modern archaeologist is transported through time to Ostrogothic Italy, helps to stabilise it after Theodoric's death, and averts its conquest by Justinian.
- Guy Gavriel Kay's Sarantine Mosaic series takes place in a setting based on Ostrogothic Italy and the East Roman Empire, just before the Gothic War.
- Gary Jennings' 1993 novel Raptor documents the rise of Theodoric the Great and the Ostrogothic Kingdom through the eyes of a fictional hermaphrodite Thorn.

== Footnotes ==
a: The exact date and circumstances surrounding Amalasuntha's execution remain a mystery. In his Secret History, Procopius proposes that Empress Theodora might have had a hand in the affair, wishing to get rid of a potential rival. Although it is generally dismissed by historians such as Gibbon and Charles Diehl, Bury (Ch. XVIII, pp. 165–167) considers that the story is corroborated by circumstantial evidence.

== Sources ==
=== Primary sources ===
- Procopius, De Bello Gothico, Volumes I–IV
- Jordanes, De origine actibusque Getarum ("The Origin and Deeds of the Goths"), translated by Charles C. Mierow.
- Cassiodorus, Chronica
- Cassiodorus, Varia epistolae ("Letters"), at the Project Gutenberg
- Anonymus Valesianus, Excerpta, Pars II

=== Secondary sources ===
- Amory, Patrick (2003). People and Identity in Ostrogothic Italy, 489–554. Cambridge University Press. ISBN 978-0-521-52635-7.
- Arnold, Jonathan J. (2014). Theoderic and the Roman Imperial Restoration. Cambridge: Cambridge University Press. doi:10.1017/cbo9781107294271. ISBN 978-1-107-05440-0.
- Barnwell, P. S. (1992). Emperor, Prefects & Kings: The Roman West, 395–565. UNC Press. ISBN 978-0-8078-2071-1.
- Burns, Thomas S. (1984). A History of the Ostrogoths. Boomington.
- Bury, John Bagnell (1923). History of the Later Roman Empire Vols. I & II. Macmillan & Co., Ltd.
- Cohen, Samuel (2016). "Religious Diversity". In Arnold, Jonathan J.; Bjornlie, M. Shane; Sessa, Kristina (eds.). A Companion to Ostrogothic Italy. Brill's Companions to European History. Vol. 9. Leiden and Boston: Brill. pp. 503–532. doi:10.1163/9789004315938_020. ISBN 978-90-04-31593-8. LCCN 2015008190.
- Gibbon, Edward. History of the Decline and Fall of the Roman Empire. Vol. IV.. Chapters 41 & 43
- Heather, Peter (1998). The Goths. Blackwell Publishing. ISBN 978-0-631-20932-4.
- Sardella, Teresa (2011). "Variations on Religious Otherness through Throne, Altar, and Monastic School (Ostrogoth Italy, 6th century)". In Berthelot, Katell; Morgenstern, Matthias (eds.). The Quest for a Common Humanity: Human Dignity and Otherness in the Religious Traditions of the Mediterranean. Numen Book Series. Vol. 134. Leiden and Boston: Brill. pp. 179–197. doi:10.1163/9789004211124_011. ISBN 978-90-04-21112-4. LCCN 2010052752.
- Syvänne, Ilkka (2021). Military History of Late Rome 518–565. Yorkshire, PA: Pen and Sword Military. ISBN 978-1-4738-9530-0.
- Wolfram, Herwig; Dunlap, Thomas (1997). The Roman Empire and its Germanic peoples. University of California Press. ISBN 978-0-520-08511-4.
