= Ostrogoths =

5th–6th-century Germanic ethnic group

- People
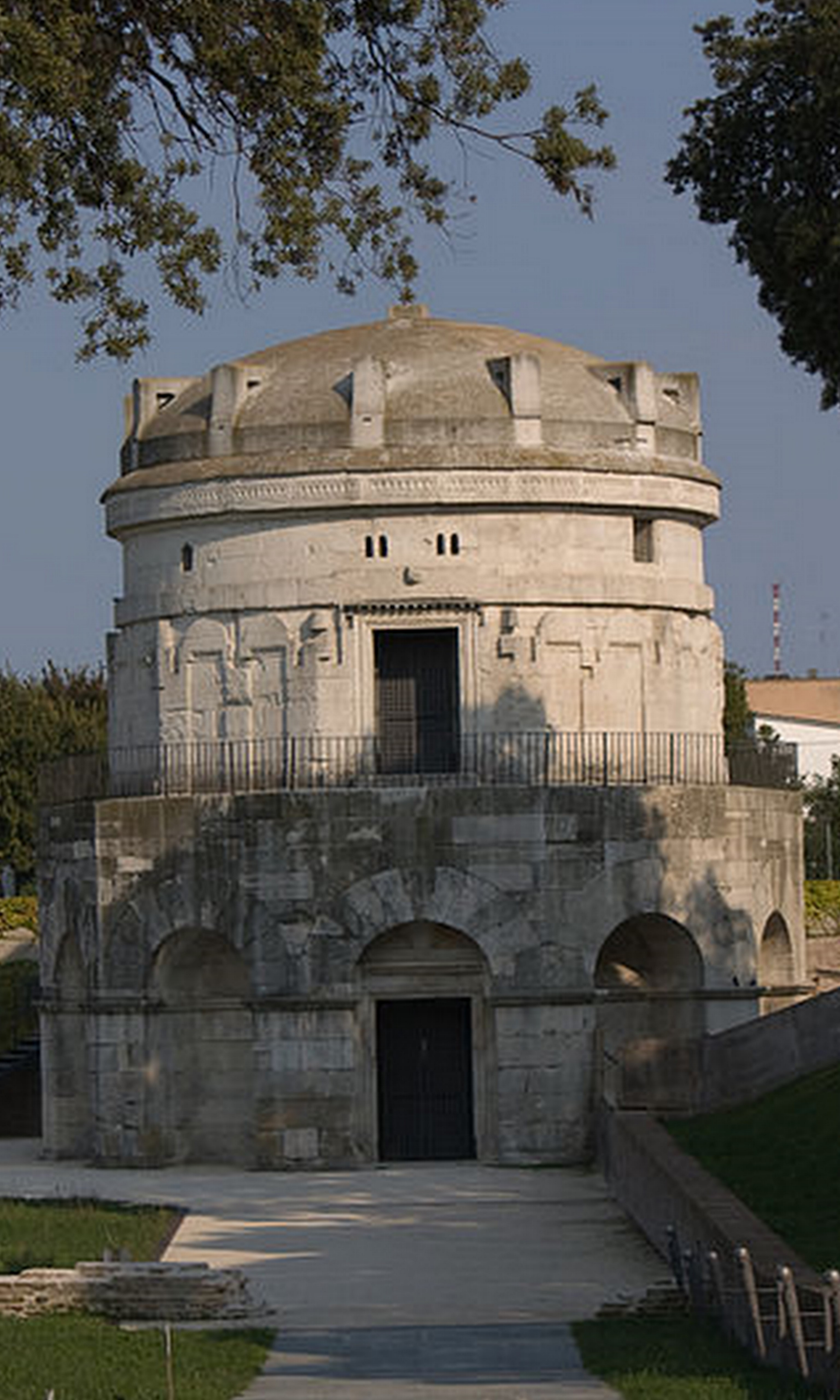
- The Mausoleum of Theodoric in Ravenna, Italy
- Ethnicity: Germanic
- Location: Balkans, Black Sea, Italian peninsula
- Language: Gothic

The Ostrogoths (Latin: Ostrogothi, Austrogothi) were a Roman-era Germanic people who, in the 5th and 6th centuries, established one of the two major Gothic kingdoms within the Western Roman Empire. The Ostrogoths were associated with the earlier Greuthungi mentioned by Roman authors such as Ammianus Marcellinus, and later identified by the historian Jordanes with the realm of Ermanaric in the 4th century. Ancient sources often referred to them simply as "Goths," but modern scholarship distinguishes them as one of the two main branches of the Gothic peoples, alongside the Visigoths. They drew on large Gothic populations settled in the Balkans and rose to prominence under Theodoric the Great, who in 493 founded the Ostrogothic Kingdom in Italy after defeating Odoacer.

Theodoric belonged to the Amal dynasty, which had gained power in Pannonia after the collapse of Attila's Hunnic empire. Backed by the Byzantine emperor Zeno, Theodoric invaded Italy and established his rule from Ravenna, preserving Roman administration, law, and culture while governing Goths and Romans under parallel systems. His reign marked the height of Ostrogothic power and stability in Italy. After Theodoric's death in 526, dynastic instability weakened the kingdom. In 535, Emperor Justinian I launched the Gothic War (535–554), aiming to restore imperial authority in the West. The Ostrogoths, revitalized under Totila, temporarily regained much of Italy, but Totila was killed at the Battle of Taginae in 552. The protracted war devastated the peninsula, and the Ostrogothic state collapsed by 554. Survivors were absorbed into the Lombards, who established their own kingdom in Italy by 568.

== Goths ==
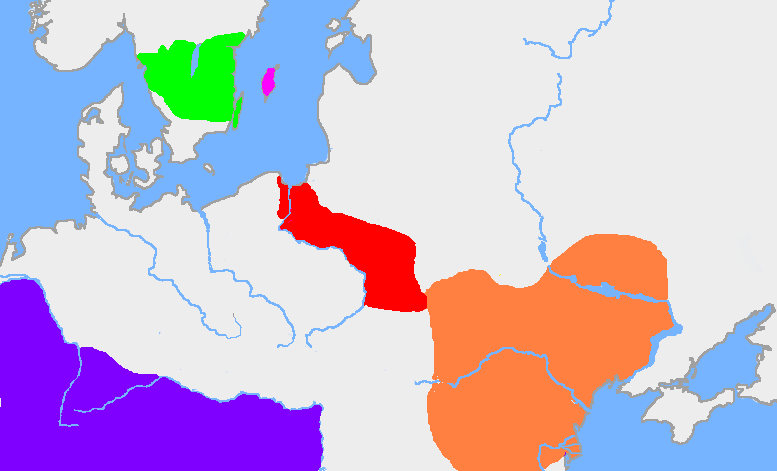
Land of the Geats (Götaland) Island of Gotland Wielbark culture, early 3rd century Chernyakhov culture, early 4th century Roman Empire

The Ostrogoths were one of several peoples referred to more generally as Goths. The Goths appear in Roman records starting in the third century, in the regions north of the Lower Danube and Black Sea. They competed for influence and Roman subsidies with peoples who had lived longer in the area, such as the Carpi, and various Sarmatians, and they contributed men to the Roman military. Based on their Germanic language and material culture, it is believed that their Gothic culture derived from cultures from the direction of the Vistula river in the north, now in Poland and originally from Götaland (in English Western and Eastern Gothlands) and Gotland in present-day Sweden. By the third century, the Goths were already composed of sub-groups with their own names, because the Tervingi, who bordered on the Roman Empire and the Carpathian Mountains, were mentioned separately on at least one occasion.

The Ostrogoths, not mentioned until later, are associated with the Greuthungi who lived further east. The dividing line between the Tervingi and the Greuthungi, was reported by Ammianus to be the Dniester River, and to the east of the Greuthungi were Alans living near the River Don.

=== Gothic language ===
The Ostrogoths in Italy used a Gothic language that had both spoken and written forms, and which is best attested today in the surviving translation of the Bible by Ulfilas. Goths were a minority in all the places they lived within the Roman empire, and no Gothic language or distinct Gothic ethnicity has survived. On the other hand, the Gothic language texts the Ostrogothic kingdom helped preserve are the only eastern Germanic language with "continuous texts" surviving, and the earliest significant remnants of any Germanic language. (Note: A language related to Gothic was still spoken sporadically in Crimea as late as the 16th and 17th centuries (Crimean Gothic language). Much of the disappearance of the Gothic language is attributable to the Goths' cultural and linguistic absorption by other European peoples during the Middle Ages.)

=== Etymology ===
The first part of the word "Ostrogoth" comes from a Germanic root *auster- meaning 'eastern'. According to the proposal of Wolfram, this was originally a boastful tribal name meaning "Goths of the rising sun", or "Goths glorified by the rising sun". (Note: Wolfram cites Moritz Schönfeld's (1911) work, Wörterbuch der altgermanischen personen- und Völkernamen as his principal naming source. See: p. 39. According to linguist Václav Blažek, this ethnonym shows several written forms in mediaeval records: Austrogoti; Austorgoti; Obstrogoti; Ostrogothi; Ostrogotus; Histrogotus; (H)ostrogothae (or Hostrogothae, Hostrogothi, Hostrogothae, Hostrogothae, Hostrogothi, Ostrogothi, Hostrogothae, Ostrogothi and Ostrogothi—these from the same record, Jordanes's Getica), and Ostrogotthi. See: Blažek, Václav. "Visigothae versus Ostrogothae". In: Graeco-Latina Brunensia vol. 17, iss. 2. 2012. pp. 17–18.) By the 6th century, however, Jordanes, for example, believed that the Visigoths and Ostrogoths were two contrasting names simply meaning western and eastern Goths.

== History ==
=== The Greuthungi and Ostrogothi before the Huns ===
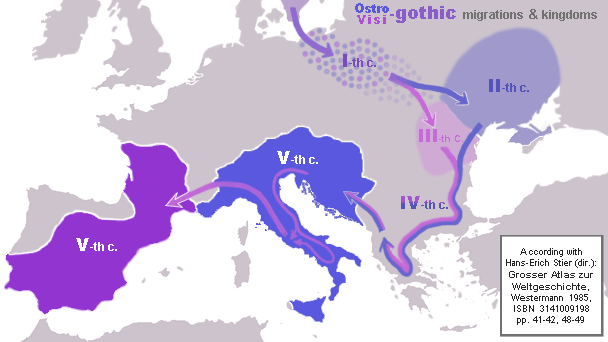
Map of the Gothic migrations and kingdoms

The nature of the divisions of the Goths before the arrival of the Huns is uncertain, but throughout all their history the Ostrogoths are only mentioned by that name very rarely, and normally in very uncertain contexts. Among other Gothic group names, however, they are associated with the Greuthungi. Scholarly opinions are divided about this connection. Historian Herwig Wolfram sees these as two names for one people as will be discussed below. Peter Heather, in contrast, has written that:

Ostrogoths in the sense of the group led by Theodoric to Italy stand at the end of complex processes of fragmentation and unification involving a variety of groups—mostly but not solely Gothic it seems—and the better, more contemporary, evidence argues against the implication derived from Jordanes that Ostrogoths are Greuthungi by another name.

Some historians go much further than Heather, questioning whether we can assume any single ethnicity, even Gothic, which united the Ostrogoths before they were politically united by the Amal clan. (Note: Heather (2007) explains Heather's position in contrast to those of Amory (1997). Also see Kulikowski (2002).)

Europe in 230 AD

One dubious early mention of the Ostrogoths is found in the Historia Augusta, which was written centuries later, and is known to contain fabricated materials. It can be interpreted as distinguishing the Ostrogoths and Greuthungi. In the article for Emperor Claudius Gothicus (reigned 268–270), the following garbled list of "Scythian" peoples is given who had been conquered by the emperor when he earned his title "Gothicus": "peuci trutungi austorgoti uirtingi sigy pedes celtae etiam eruli". These words are traditionally edited by modern scholars to include well-known peoples: "Peuci, Grutungi, Austrogoti, Tervingi, Visi, Gipedes, Celtae etiam et Eruli" (emphasis added). However, this work is not considered reliable, especially for contemporary terminology.

The first record of a Gothic sub-group acting in its own name, specifically the Tervingi, was dated from 291. The Greuthungi, Vesi, and Ostrogothi are all attested no earlier than 388.

Gothic raids in the 3rd century

The Ostrogoths were first definitely mentioned more than one hundred years later than the Tervingi in 399, and this is the only certain mention of this name at all before the Amals created their kingdom of Italy. A poem by Claudian describes Ostrogoths who are mixed with Greuthungi and settled in Phrygia together as a disgruntled barbarian military force, who had once fought against Rome, but were now supposed to fight for it. Claudian only uses the term Ostrogoth once in the long poem, but in other references to this same group he more often calls them Greuthungi or "Getic" (an older word used poetically for Goths in this period). These Goths came to be led into rebellion by Tribigild, a Roman general of Gothic background. Much later Zosimus also described Tribigild and his rebellion against the eunuch consul Eutropius. Gainas, the aggrieved Gothic general sent to fight Tribigild, openly joined forces with him after the death of Eutropius. Zosimus believed that was conspiracy between the two Goths from the beginning. (Note: Claudian, Against Eutropius, 2.141; Zosimus, New History, Book 5. For commentary see Wolfram (1988, pp. 24, 387fn52), Christensen (2002, pp. 216–217) and Cameron, Long & Sherry (1993). Note Wolfram describes this as a poem to 392, though as Christensen and Cameron et al. note, it was written after the death of Eutropius the consul (died 399). On the dating of Claudian's poem see Long (1996, ch.5).) It is generally believed by historians that this Phrygian settlement of Greuthingi, referred to as including Ostrogoths, were part of the Greuthungi-led force led by Odotheus in 386, and not the Greuthungi who had entered the empire earlier, in 376 under Alatheus and Saphrax. Starting with the 6th century writer Jordanes, whose Getica is a history of the Ostrogothic Amal dynasty, there is a tradition of simply equating the Greuthungi with the Ostrogothi. Jordanes does not mention the Greuthungi at all by that name, but he identified the Ostrogothic kings of Italy, the Amal dynasty, as the heirs and descendants of king Ermanaric. Ermanaric was described by Roman soldier and historian Ammianus Marcellinus as a king of the Greuthungi; however, the family succession described by the two classical authors is completely different, and Ammianus is considered to be the more reliable source. (Note: Christensen summarizes the field's position: "There has never been any doubt that of these two conflicting accounts, the one by Ammianus Marcellinus was to be preferred". Christensen especially cites Peter Heather.) Jordanes also specified that around 250 (the time of Emperor Philip the Arab who reigned 244–249) the Ostrogoths were ruled by a king called Ostrogotha and they either derived their name from this "father of the Ostrogoths", or else the Ostrogoths and Visigoths got these names because they meant eastern and western Goths.

Europe in 305 AD

Modern historians agree that Jordanes is unreliable, especially for events long before his time, but some historians such as Herwig Wolfram defend the equation of the Greuthungi and Ostrogoths. Wolfram follows the position of Franz Altheim that the terms Tervingi and Greuthungi were older geographical identifiers used by outsiders to describe these Visigoths and Ostrogoths before they crossed the Danube, and that this terminology dropped out of use around 400, when many Goths had moved into the Roman empire. According to Wolfram, the terms "Vesi" and "Ostrogothi" were used by the peoples themselves to boastfully describe themselves, and thus remained in use. In support of this, Wolfram argues that it is significant that Roman writers either used terminology contrasting Tervingi and Greuthungi, or Vesi/Visigoths and Ostrogoths, and never mixed these pairs—for example they never contrasted Tervingi and Ostrogoths. As described above, there are two examples of Roman texts that mix Wolfram's proposed geographical and boastful terminologies as if these were separate peoples, and these are the only two early mentions of Ostrogoths before the Amals. For Wolfram, these ancient sources were mistaken to see these peoples as separate, but he notes that neither contrasts what he considers to be the geographical and boastful terms. As an argument for this geographical versus boastful contrast, Wolfram cites Zosimus as referring to the group of "Scythians" north of the Danube after 376, who were called "Greuthungi" by the barbarians, arguing that these were in fact Thervingi, and that this shows how the name "Greuthungi" was only used by outsiders. Nonetheless, the Greuthungi alluded to by Zosimus could be those Heather and other historians equate with the rebellious Greuthungi—mentioned later by Claudian in Phrygia in 399/400—who were, according to Claudian, mixed with Ostrogoths.

In any case, the older terminology of a divided Gothic people disappeared gradually after they entered the Roman Empire. The term "Visigoth" was an invention of the sixth century. Cassiodorus, a Roman in the service of Theodoric the Great, invented the term Visigothi to match Ostrogothi, differentiating between "western Goths" and "eastern Goths" respectively. The western–eastern division was a simplification and a literary device of sixth-century historians, where political realities were more complex. Furthermore, Cassiodorus used the term "Goths" to refer only to the Ostrogoths, whom he served, and reserved the geographical term "Visigoths" for the Gallo-Hispanic Goths. This usage, however, was adopted by the Visigoths themselves in their communications with the Byzantine Empire and was in use in the seventh century.

Other names for the Goths abounded. A "Germanic" Byzantine or Italian author referred to one of the two peoples as the Valagothi, meaning "Roman [walha] Goths". In 484, the Ostrogoths had been called the Valameriaci (men of Valamir) because they followed Theodoric, a descendant of Valamir. This terminology survived in the Byzantine East as late as the reign of Athalaric, who was called του Ουαλεμεριακου (tou Oualemeriakou) by John Malalas.

=== Hunnic invasions and the Amals ===
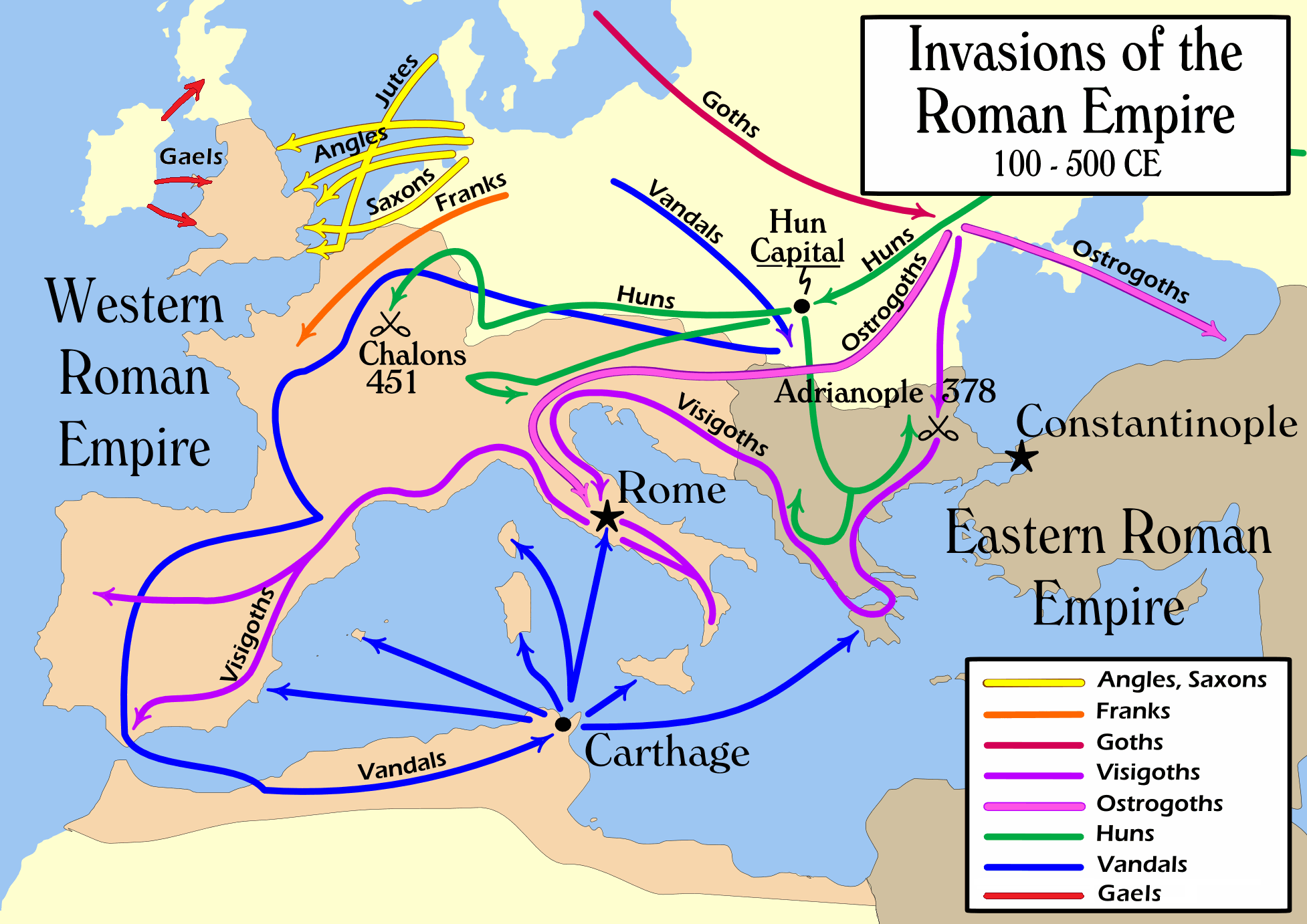
Routes taken by Germanic invaders during the Migration Period

In the late 4th century, the rise of the Huns forced many of the Goths and Alans to join them, while others moved westwards and eventually moved into Roman territory in the Balkans. Ostrogoths and Greuthungi, perhaps the same people, are believed to have been among the first Goths who were subdued by the Huns. Many Greuthungi entered the Roman Empire in 376 with Saphrax and Alatheus, and many of these Goths probably subsequently joined Alaric, contributing to the formation of the Visigothic kingdom. A group of Ostrogoths and Greuthungi were also settled in Phrygia in the 380s by the Romans. Otherwise, historical records only begin to mention the name of the Ostrogoths as the Gothic political entity that formed in the Balkans during the 5th century. The Amal-led Ostrogothic kingdom began to coalesce around the leadership of the Amal dynasty who had fought under Attila, and later settled in Pannonia. The second major component of the Amal kingdom's population were the Thracian Goths. This occurred around 483/484.

==== 5th-century Pannonian Ostrogoths ====
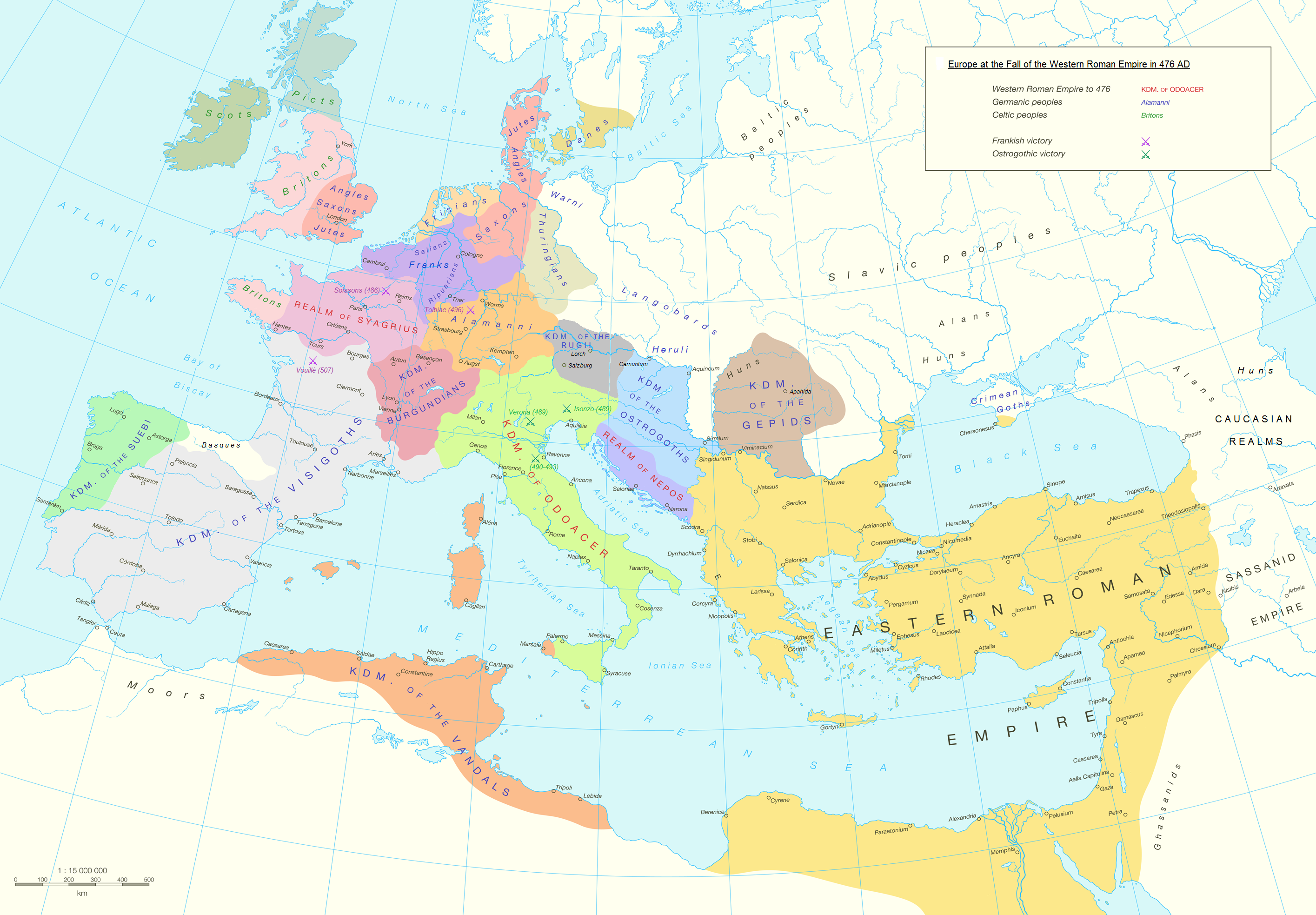
Barbarian kingdoms and tribes after the fall of the Western Roman Empire in 476

The Pannonian Ostrogoths had fought alongside both Alans and Huns. Like several other tribal peoples, they became one of the many Hunnic vassals fighting in Europe, as in the Battle of Chalons in 451, where the Huns were defeated by the Roman general Aetius, accompanied by a contingent of Alans, and Visigoths. Jordanes's account of this battle certainly cannot be trusted as he wrongly attributes a good portion of the victory to the Goths, when it was the Alans who formed the "backbone of Roman defences." More generally, Jordanes, depicts the Amals as an ancient royal family in his Getica, making them traditionally preeminent among the Goths in Ukraine, both before and during the empire of Attila. Valamir, the uncle of Theodoric the Great, is even depicted as Attila's most highly valued leader along with Ardaric of the Gepids. Modern historians such as Peter Heather believe this is an exaggeration, and point out that there were at least three factions of Goths in Attila's forces.

The recorded history of the Ostrogoths as a political entity thus begins with their independence from the remains of the Hunnic Empire following the death of Attila the Hun in 453. Under Valimir they were among the peoples who were living in the Middle Danube region by this time, and whose freedom from domination by Attila's sons was confirmed by the Battle of Nedao in 454, which was led by the Gepids. It is unclear what role the Goths played in this battle, if any, and after the battle many Goths entered Roman military service, while only some began to coalesce under the leadership of Valamir and his two brothers, Vidimir and Theodemir, the father of Theodoric the Great.

These Amal-led Goths apparently first settled in the Pannonian area of Lake Balaton and Sirmium (Sremska Mitrovica), on the Roman Danube frontier. The land they acquired between Vindobona (Vienna) and Sirmium (Sremska Mitrovica) was not well-managed, a fact which rendered the Ostrogoths dependent upon Constantinople for subsidies. They came into conflict with other Middle Danubian peoples including the Danubian Suebian kingdom of Hunimund, and the Sciri, who had arrived as part of the Hunnic empire, and this led to the death of Valimir, and eventual Gothic victory at the Battle of Bolia in 469, now under Theodemir. Theodemir, father of Theoderic, brought these Goths into East Roman territory in 473/474. The younger uncle of Theoderic, Vidimir, with his like-named son and some of the Pannonian Goths, headed to Italy and his son was eventually settled in Gaul.

Theodemir and Theoderic moved their Goths around the Balkans, while in the meantime, the Thracian Goths were the main focus of Gothic power. For some time they held a part of Macedonia, controlling part of the Via Egnatia between the major Roman cities of Durrës and Thessalonika. Theodemir died in Cyrrhus in 474, having made sure that Theoderic (the future "Great") was designated as successor. In the same year, the other Theoderic ("Strabo"), fell out of favour with the new emperor Zeno.

==== 5th-century Thracian Goths ====
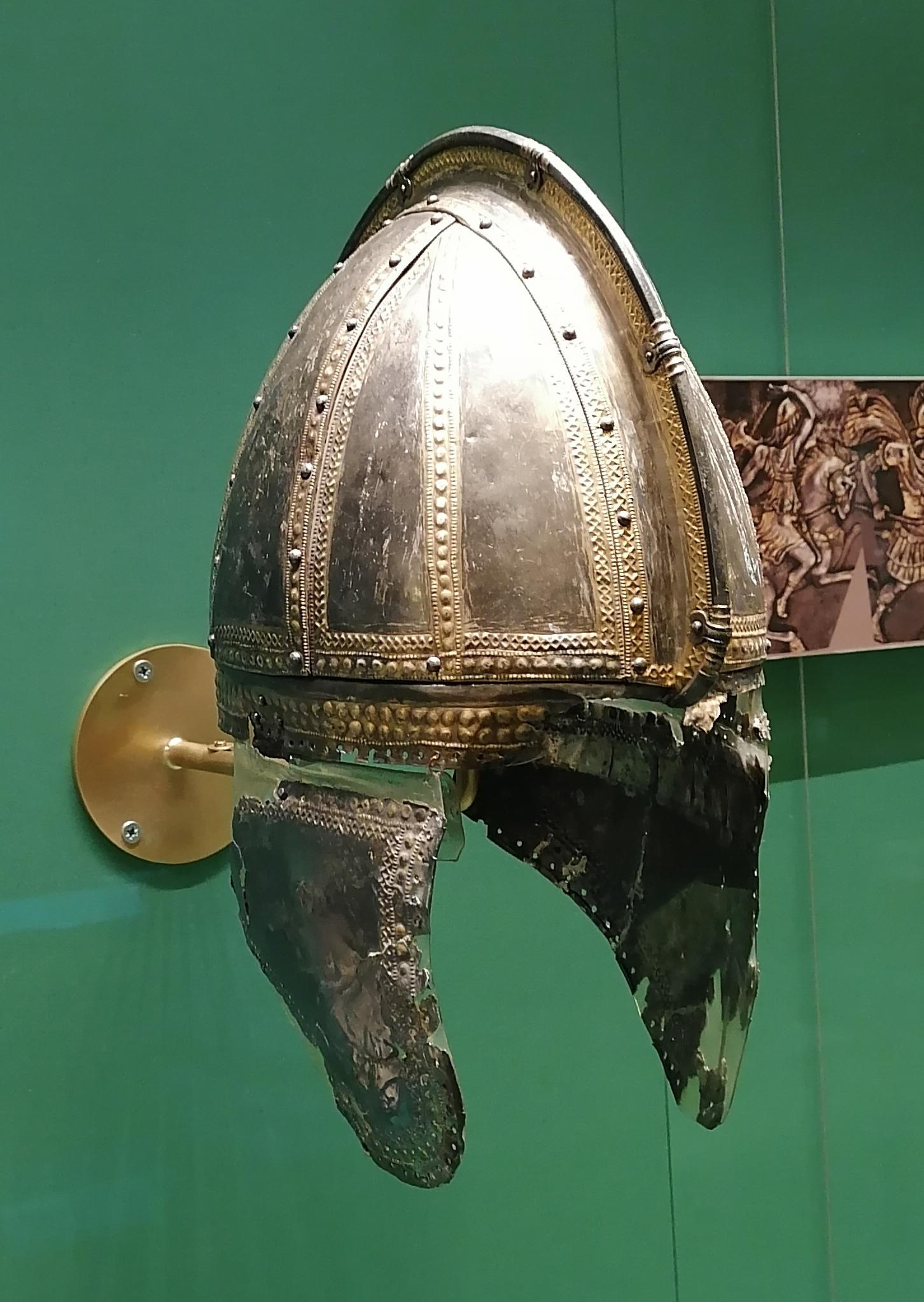
The Concesti helmet was found among the burial goods of a probable Ostrogothic Prince. Hermitage Museum.

The 5th century Thracian Goths, according to Peter Heather, had probably become unified only in about the 460s, although they probably lived in the area since the 420s when a group of Goths under Hunnic influence already in Pannonia were detached and settled there. Wolfram has proposed that Theoderic Strabo was an Amal, whose father had split with Theoderic's branch only as recently as the time of the Battle of Nadao.

They formed a military force that was loyal to Aspar, the East Roman magister militum ("master of soldiers") of Alanic-Gothic descent, who was killed in 471. Aspar's death saw a change in the East Roman approach to Gothic military forces that he had been allied to. Theoderic Strabo led a revolt in 473 and was declared king of the Goths. As Wolfram noted, "His elevation as king in Thrace in 473 parallels the elevation of Odoacer in 476. [...] A Roman federate army sought to force through its demands by making its general king". He demanded to be recognized as the "sole Gothic king to whom all deserters had to be returned [...] and he further demanded the settling of his people in Thrace as well as the surrender of the institutional and material inheritance of Aspar. It took more bloodshed and devastation before the emperor formally agreed to the demands and promised in addition to pay two thousand pounds of gold each year." In return his Goths were ready to fight for Rome, except for a campaign against the Vandal kingdom in North Africa.

With the death of Emperor Leo II, and the succession of Aspar's old rival Emperor Zeno in 474, the situation for the old Gothic party became increasingly difficult in the eastern empire, and Theoderic Strabo lost the support of the emperor. The younger Theoderic, son of Theodemir, was able to benefit from this.

==== Zeno's Gothic intrigue ====
About 476, Zeno withdrew his support from Theoderic Strabo and started to give important honours to Theoderic the Amal, the son of Theodemir. He was adopted as a "son in arms", named a friend of the emperor, and given the status of patricius and commander-in-chief. His kingdom, now based on the Lower Danube in Moesia, was recognized as a federate kingdom and granted (at least in theory) an annual subsidy. However, when Zeno forced the two Gothic groups into a confrontation in 478, Theoderic Strabo petitioned the Amal-led Goths, making a case for Gothic unity. Strabo also appealed to Zeno, but Zeno made new offers to Theoderic the Amal instead, but these were rejected. Warfare between the Goths and imperial forces ensued, and the Amal-led Goths once again became mobile, leaving Moesia. Zeno proposed a new federate kingdom for them in Dacia, north of the Danube, but instead the Goths attempted to take Durrës; however, Roman forces quickly repulsed them.

Between 479 and 481, it was the Thracian Goths under Theoderic Strabo who kept the Romans occupied, but in 481 Strabo died, when he fell from his horse and was impaled on a lance. His son Recitac was unable to retain Gothic support and was killed in 484 under orders from Theoderic the Amal, who united the two Gothic groups. Zeno was forced to conclude a treaty and Theoderic the Amal was named consul in 484. Hostilities between Theoderic the Amal's Goths and the Eastern Roman Empire began again by 487.

=== Kingdom in Italy ===
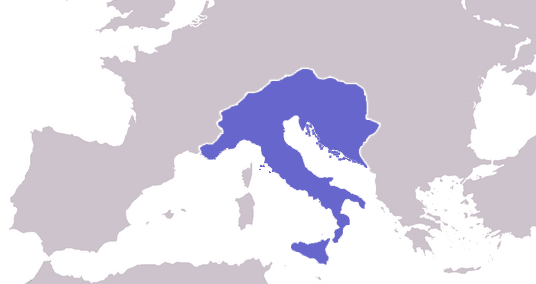
Ostrogothic Kingdom of Italy

The greatest of all Ostrogothic rulers, the future Theodoric the Great (whose Gothic name meant "leader of the people") of the Ostrogothic Kingdom (Regnum Italiae, "Kingdom of Italy") (Note: See: http://www.thelatinlibrary.com/cassiodorus/varia2.shtml Flavius Magnus Aurelius Cassiodorus Senator, Variae, Lib. II., XLI. Luduin regi Francorum Theodericus rex) was born to Theodemir in or about 454, soon after the Battle of Nedao. His childhood was spent at Constantinople as a diplomatic hostage, where he was carefully educated. The early part of his life was taken up with various disputes, intrigues and wars within the Byzantine empire, in which he had as his rival Theodoric Strabo of the Thracian Goths, a distant relative of Theodoric the Great and son of Triarius. This older but lesser Theodoric seems to have been the chief, not the king, of that branch of the Ostrogoths that had settled within the Empire earlier. Theodoric the Great, as he is sometimes distinguished, was sometimes the friend, sometimes the enemy, of the Empire. In the former case he was clothed with various Roman titles and offices, as patrician and consul; but in all cases alike he remained the national Ostrogothic king. Theodoric is also known for his attainment of support from the Catholic Church and on one occasion, he even helped resolve a disputed papal election. During his reign, Theodoric, who was an Arian, allowed freedom of religion, which had not been done before. However, he did try to appease the Pope and tried to keep his alliance with the church strong. He saw the Pope as an authority not only in the church but also over Rome itself. His ability to work well with Italy's nobles, members of the Roman Senate, and the Catholic Church all helped facilitate his acceptance as the ruler of Italy.

Ostrogothic belt buckle, Pavia Civic Museums

Theodoric sought to revive Roman culture and government and in doing so, profited the Italian people. It was in both characters together that he set out in 488, by commission from the Byzantine emperor Zeno, to recover Italy from Odoacer. In 489, the Rugii, a Germanic tribe who dwelt in the Hungarian Plain, joined the Ostrogoths in their invasion of Italy under their leader Frideric. By 493 Ravenna was taken, where Theodoric would set up his capital. It was also at this time that Odoacer was killed by Theodoric's own hand. Historian Ian Wood claims that Theodoric's reign in Italy following the fall of Odoacer reflected not a rupture from Roman traditions but their strategic appropriation. After entering Ravenna in 493, Theodoric refrained from adopting the title rex Gotorum, and instead assumed the posture of a Roman ruler. In 498, the Eastern emperor Anastasius formally returned the imperial regalia to the West and allowed Theodoric to appoint consuls, effectively granting him symbolic seniority in the imperial hierarchy. Theodoric's administration preserved Roman bureaucratic frameworks, which are extensively documented in the Variae of Cassiodorus. Rather than a distinctly "Gothic" regime, his court continued to function within the idioms of Roman law, ceremony, and governance. Ostrogothic power was fully established over Italy, Sicily, Dalmatia and the lands to the north of Italy. Around 500, Theodoric celebrated his thirtieth anniversary as King of the Ostrogoths. In order to improve their chances against the Roman Empire the Ostrogoths and Visigoths began again to unite in what became a loose confederation of Germanic peoples. The two branches of the nation were soon brought closer together; after he was forced to become regent of the Visigothic kingdom of Toulouse, the power of Theodoric was practically extended over a large part of Gaul and over nearly the whole of the Iberian Peninsula. Theodoric forged alliances with the Visigoths, Alamanni, Franks and Burgundians, some of which were accomplished through diplomatic marriages.

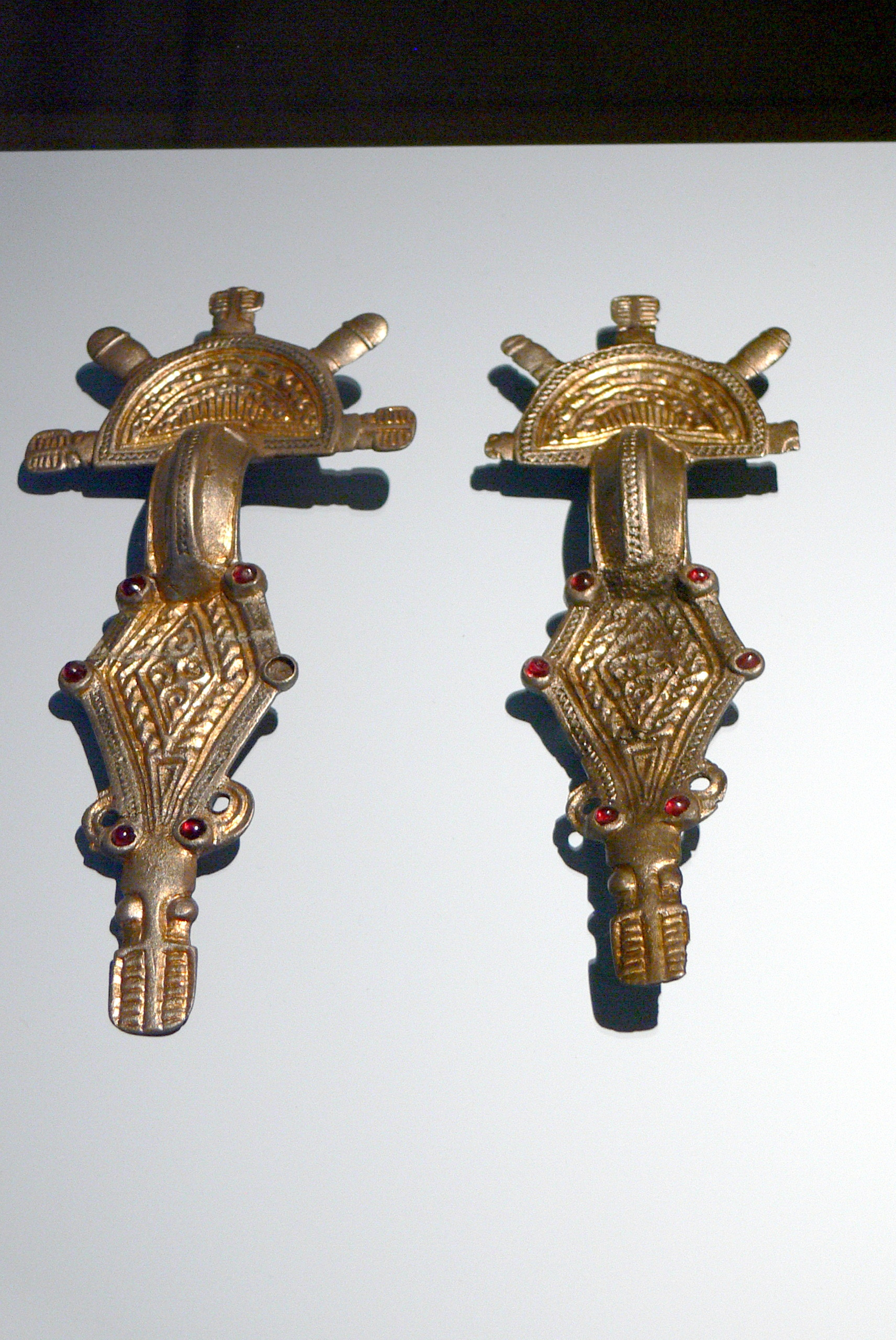
Ostrogothic bow-fibulae (c. 500) from Emilia-Romagna, Italy

The Ostrogothic dominion was once again as far-reaching and splendid as it was in the time of Hermanaric; however, it was now of a wholly different character. The dominion of Theodoric was not a barbarian but a civilized power. His twofold position ran through everything. He was at once king of the Goths and successor, though without any imperial titles, of the Western Roman emperors. The two nations, differing in manners, language and religion, lived side by side on the soil of Italy; each was ruled according to its own law, by the prince who was, in his two separate characters, the common sovereign of both. Due to his ability to foster and leverage relations among the various Germanic kingdoms, the Byzantines began to fear Theodoric's power, which led to an alliance between the Byzantine emperor and the Frankish king, Clovis I, a pact designed to counteract and ultimately overthrow the Ostrogoths. In some ways Theodoric may have been overly accommodating to both the Romans and other Gothic people as he placated Catholics and Arian Christians alike. Historian Herwig Wolfram suggests that Theodoric's efforts in trying to appease Latin and barbarian cultures in kind brought about the collapse of Ostrogothic predominance and also resulted in the "end of Italy as the heartland of late antiquity." All the years of creating a protective perimeter around Italy were broken down by the Franco-Byzantine coalition. Theodoric was able to temporarily salvage some of his realm with the assistance of the Thuringians. Realizing that the Franks were the most significant threat to the Visigothic empire as well, Alaric II, (who was the son-in-law of Theodoric) enlisted the aid of the Burgundians and fought against the Franks at the urging of the magnates of his tribe, but this choice proved an error and he allegedly met his end at the hand of the Frankish king, Clovis.

A time of confusion followed the death of Alaric II who was slain during the Battle of Vouillé. The Ostrogothic king Theodoric stepped in as the guardian of his grandson Amalaric, and preserved for him all his Iberian and a fragment of his Gallic dominion. Toulouse passed to the Franks but the Goths kept Narbonne and its district and Septimania, which was the last part of Gaul held by the Goths, keeping the name of Gothia for many years. Theodoric claimed a kind of protectorate over a large part of Italy and his Goths were embraced by the Roman population as Rome's defenders and part of its victorious army, while much fanfare was made of Theodoric's alleged "royal ancestry", which favorably cast his clan "on par with an imperial dynasty". Romans were in some ways "reinvigorated" by these new Gothic warriors as "guardians of Romanitas" who, along with their Italo-Roman neighbors created a new "Gothic aegis" for the western empire, while those outside of Theodoric's order were made into veritable "barbarians".

From 508 to 511 under Theodoric's command, the Ostrogoths marched on Gaul as the Vandal king of Carthage and Clovis made concerted efforts to weaken his hold on the Visigoths. On the death of Theodoric in 526, the eastern and western Goths were once again divided. By the late 6th century, the Ostrogoths lost their political identity and assimilated into other Germanic tribes.

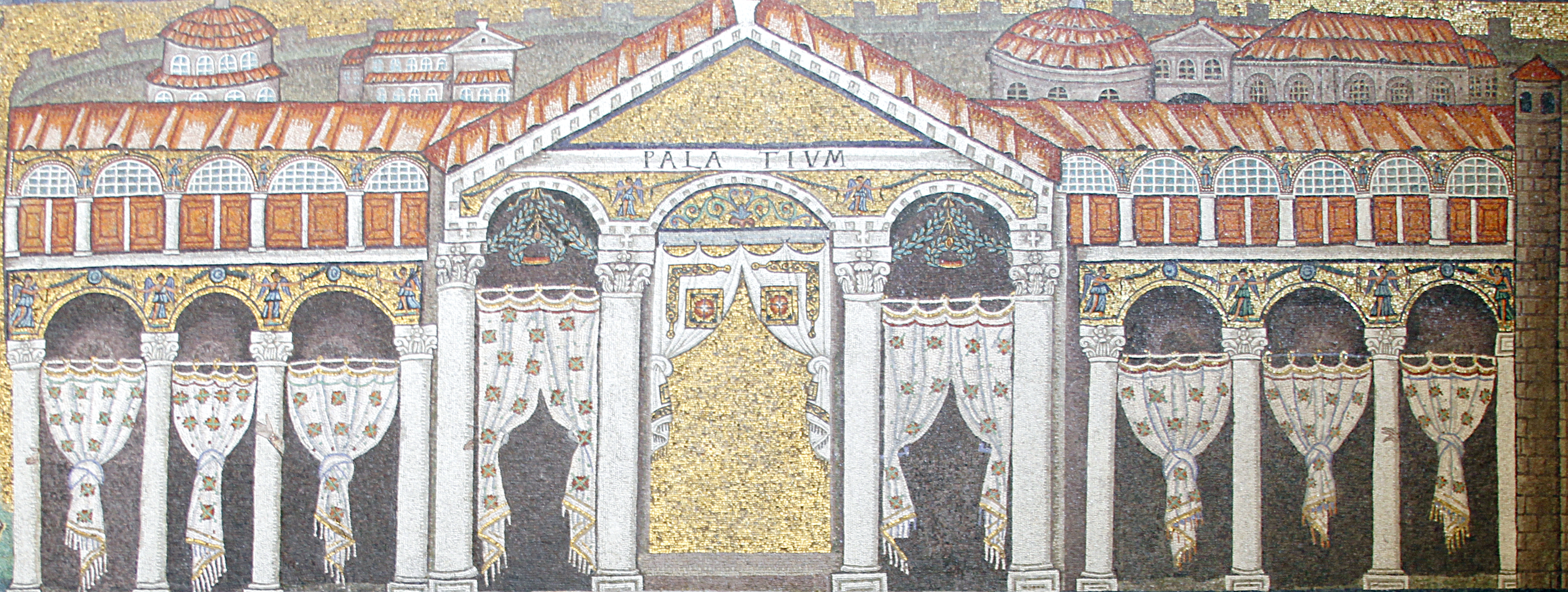
Mosaic depicting the palace of Theodoric the Great in his palace chapel of San Apollinare Nuovo

The picture of Theodoric's rule is drawn for us in the state papers drawn up, in his name and in the names of his successors, by his Roman minister Cassiodorus. The Goths seem to have been thick on the ground in northern Italy; in the south they formed little more than garrisons. Meanwhile, the Frankish king Clovis fought protracted wars against various enemies while consolidating his rule, forming the embryonic stages of what would eventually become Medieval Europe.

=== War with Byzantium (535–554) ===
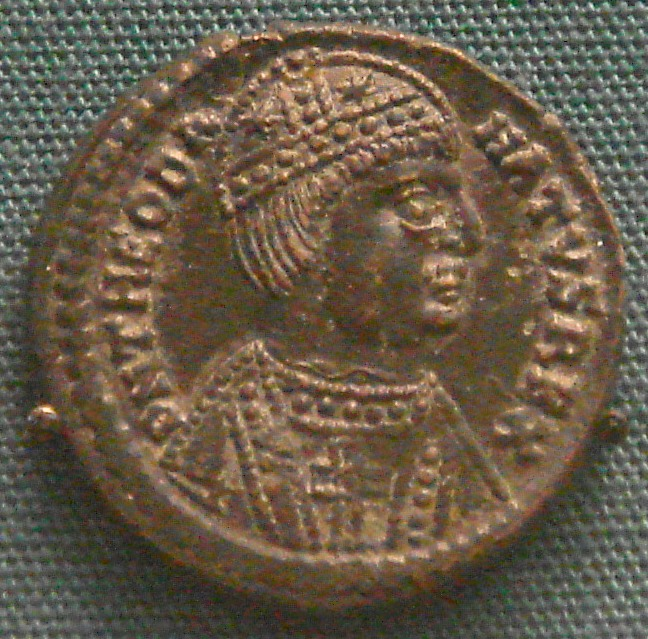
Coin of Theodahad (534–536), minted in Rome – he wears the barbaric moustache.

Absent the unifying presence of Theodoric, the Ostrogoths and Visigoths were unable to consolidate their realms despite their common Germanic kinship. The few instances where they acted together after this time are as scattered and incidental as they were before. Amalaric succeeded to the Visigothic kingdom in Iberia and Septimania. Theodoric's grandson Athalaric took on the mantle as king of the Ostrogoths for the next five years. Provence was added to the dominion of the new Ostrogothic king Athalaric and through his daughter Amalasuntha who was named regent. Both were unable to settle disputes among Gothic elites. Theodahad, cousin of Amalasuntha and nephew of Theodoric through his sister, took over and slew them; however, the usurping ushered in more bloodshed. Atop this infighting, the Ostrogoths faced the doctrinal challenges incurred from their Arian Christianity, which both the aristocracy of Byzantium and the papacy strongly opposed—so much that it brought them together.

The weakness of the Ostrogothic position in Italy now showed itself, particularly when Eastern Roman Emperor Justinian I enacted a law excluding pagans—among them Arian Christians and Jews—from public employment. The Ostrogothic King Theodoric reacted by persecuting Catholics. Nonetheless, Justinian always strove to restore as much of the Western Roman Empire as he could and certainly would not pass up the opportunity. Launched on both land and sea, Justinian began his war of reconquest. In 535, he commissioned Belisarius to attack the Ostrogoths following the success he had in North Africa against the Vandals. It was Justinian's intention to recover Italy and Rome from the Goths. Belisarius quickly captured Sicily and then crossed into Italy, where he captured Naples and Rome in December of 536. Sometime during the spring of 537, the Goths marched on Rome with upwards of 100,000 men under the leadership of Witiges and laid siege to the city, albeit unsuccessfully. Despite outnumbering the Romans by a five-to-one margin, the Goths could not loose Belisarius from the former western capital of the Empire. After recuperating from siege warfare, Belisarius marched north, taking Mediolanum (Milan) and the Ostrogoth capital of Ravenna in 540.

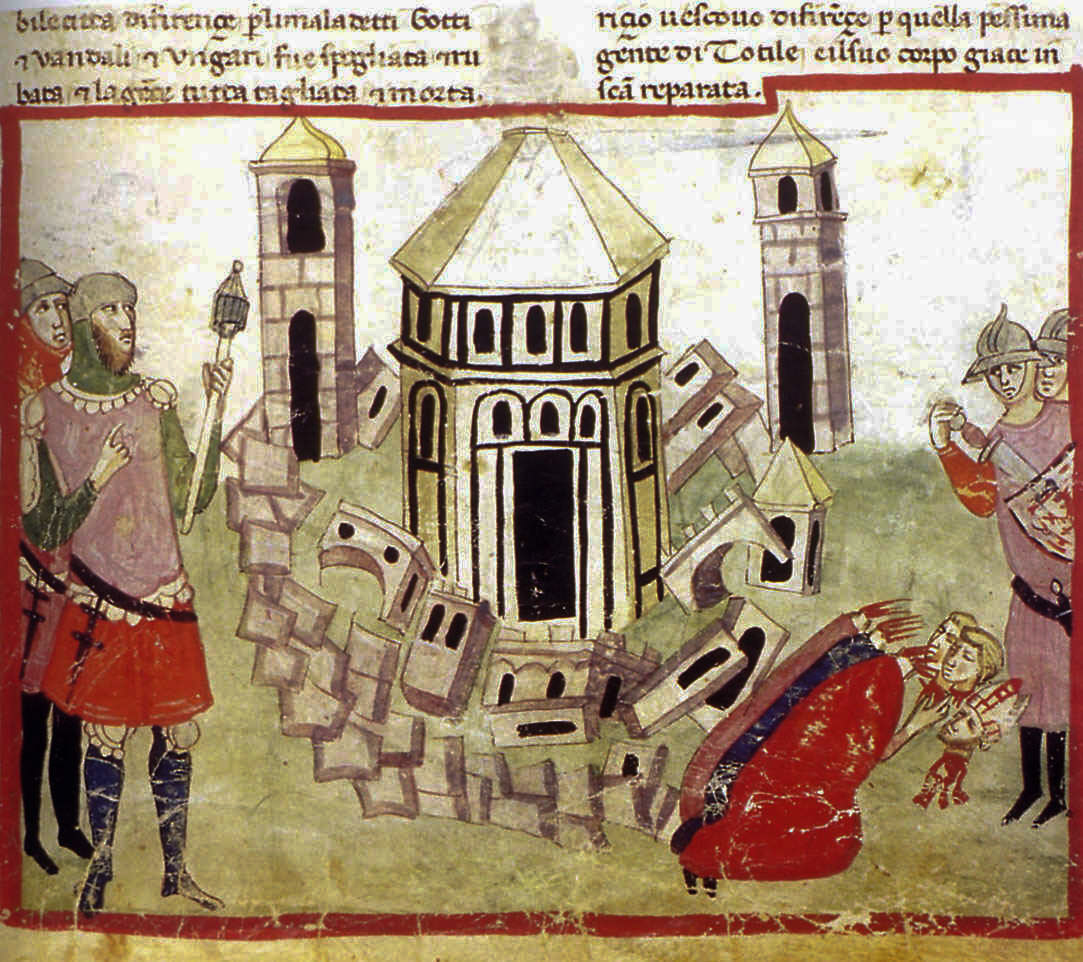
Totila razes the walls of Florence: illumination from the Chigi manuscript of Villani's Cronica

With the attack on Ravenna, Witiges and his men were trapped in the Ostrogothic capital. Belisarius proved more capable at siege warfare than his rival Witiges had been at Rome and the Ostrogoth ruler, who was also dealing with Frankish enemies, was forced to surrender, but not without terms. Belisarius refused to grant any concessions save unconditional surrender since Justinian wanted to make Witiges a vassal king in Trans-Padane Italy. This condition made for something of an impasse. A faction of the Gothic nobility pointed out that their own king Witiges, who had just lost, was something of a weakling and they would need a new one. Eraric, the leader of the group, endorsed Belisarius and the rest of the kingdom agreed, so they offered him their crown. Belisarius was a soldier, not a statesman, and still loyal to Justinian. He made as if to accept the offer, rode to Ravenna to be crowned, and promptly arrested the leaders of the Goths and reclaimed their entire kingdom—no halfway settlements—for the Empire. Fearful that Belisarius might set himself up a permanent kingship should he consolidate his conquests, Justinian recalled him to Constantinople with Witiges in tow. With the fall of Ravenna, the capital of the kingdom was brought to Pavia, which became the last center of Ostrogothic resistance against Eastern Roman rule.

As soon as Belisarius was gone, the remaining Ostrogoths elected a new king named Totila. Under the brilliant command of Totila, the Goths were able to reassert themselves to a degree. For a period of nearly ten years, control for Italy became a seesaw battle between Byzantine and Ostrogothic forces. Totila eventually recaptured all of northern Italy and even drove the Byzantines out of Rome, thereby affording him the opportunity to take political control of the city, partly by executing the Roman senatorial order. Many of them fled eastwards for Constantinople.

By 550 Justinian was able to put together an enormous force, an assembly designed to recover his losses and subdue any Gothic resistance. In 551, the Roman navy destroyed Totila's fleet and in 552 an overwhelming Byzantine force under Narses entered Italy from the north. Attempting to surprise the invading Byzantines, Totila gambled with his forces at Taginaei, where he was slain. Broken but not yet defeated, the Ostrogoths made one final stand at Campania under a chief named Teia, but when he was also killed in battle at Nuceria they finally capitulated. On surrendering, they informed Narses that evidently "the hand of God was against them" and so they left Italy for the northern lands of their fathers. After that final defeat, the Ostrogothic name wholly died. The nation had practically evaporated with Theodoric's death. The leadership of western Europe therefore passed by default to the Franks. Consequently, Ostrogothic failure and Frankish success were crucial for the development of early medieval Europe, for Theodoric had made it "his intention to restore the vigor of Roman government and Roman culture". The chance of forming a national state in Italy by the union of Roman and Germanic elements, such as those that arose in Gaul, in Iberia, and in parts of Italy under Lombard rule, was thus lost. The failures of the barbarian kingdoms to maintain control of the regions they conquered were partly the result of leadership vacuums like those that resulted from the death of Theodoric (also the lack of male succession) and Totila but additionally as a consequence of political fragmentation amid the Germanic tribes as their loyalties wavered between their kin and their erstwhile enemies. Frankish entry onto the geopolitical map of Europe also bears into play: had the Ostrogoths attained more military success against the Byzantines on the battlefield by combining the strength of other Germanic tribes, this could have changed the direction of Frankish loyalty. Military success or defeat and political legitimacy were interrelated in barbarian society.

Nevertheless, according to Roman historian Procopius of Caesarea, the Ostrogothic population was allowed to live peacefully in Italy with their Rugian allies under Roman sovereignty. They later joined the Lombards during their conquest of Italy. (Note: De Bello Gothico IV 32, pp. 241–245; this reference stems from the pen of the Byzantine historian, Procopius, who accompanied Justinian's leading general, Belisarius, on his exploits between 527 and 540. This included the campaigns against the Ostrogoths, which is the subject of De Bello Gothico.)

== Culture ==
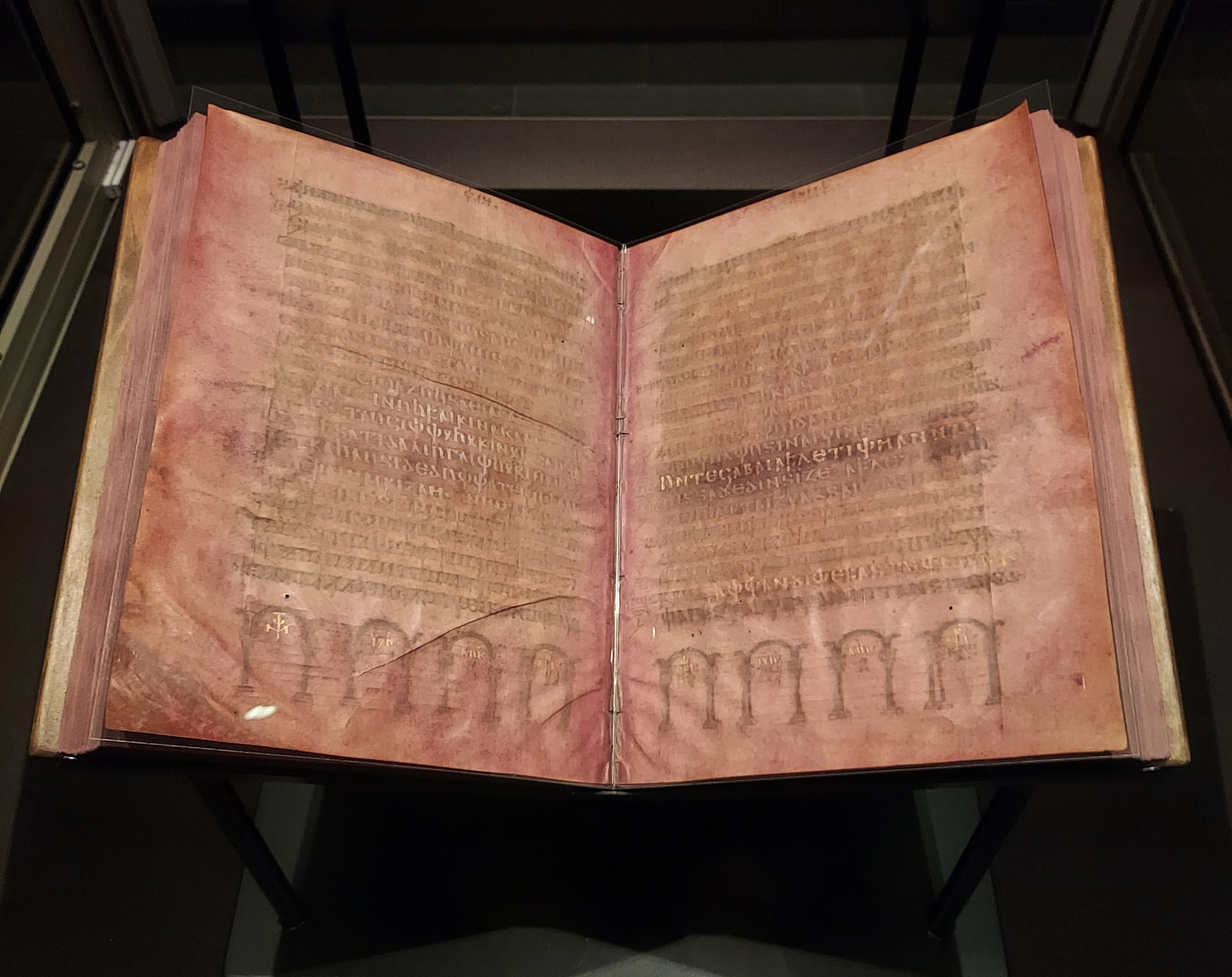
The Codex Argenteus, a 6th-century Gothic manuscript

=== Written records ===
Surviving Gothic writings in the Gothic language include the Ulfilas Bible translation and other religious writings and fragments. In terms of Gothic legislation in Latin, one finds the edict of Theodoric from around the year 500, and the Variae of Cassiodorus, which may also pass as a collection of the state papers of Theodoric and his immediate successors. Among the Visigoths, written laws had already been codified by Euric. Alaric II published a Breviarium of Roman law for his Roman subjects; but the great collection of Visigothic laws dates from the later days of the monarchy, being promulgated by the Visigothic King Reccaswinth about 654. This code gave occasion to some well-known comments by Montesquieu and Gibbon, and has been discussed by Savigny (Geschichte des römischen Rechts, ii. 65) and by various other writers. They are printed in the Monumenta Germaniae, leges, tome i. (1902).

Amid Gothic histories that remain, besides that of the frequently quoted Jordanes, there is the Gothic history of Isidore, archbishop of Seville, a special source of the history of the Visigothic kings down to Suinthila (621–631). But all the Latin and Greek writers contemporary with the days of Gothic predominance also made their contributions. Not for special facts, but for a general estimate, no writer is more instructive than Salvian of Marseilles in the 5th century, whose work, De Gubernatione Dei, is full of passages contrasting the vices of the Romans with the virtues of the "barbarians", especially of the Goths. In all such pictures one must allow a good deal for exaggeration both ways, but there must be a groundwork of truth. The chief virtues that the Roman Catholic presbyter praises in the Arian Goths are their chastity, their piety according to their own creed, their tolerance towards the Catholics under their rule, and their general good treatment of their Roman subjects. He even ventures to hope that such good people may be saved, notwithstanding their heresy. This image must have had some basis in truth, but it is not very surprising that the later Visigoths of Iberia had fallen away from Salvian's somewhat idealistic picture.

=== Art ===
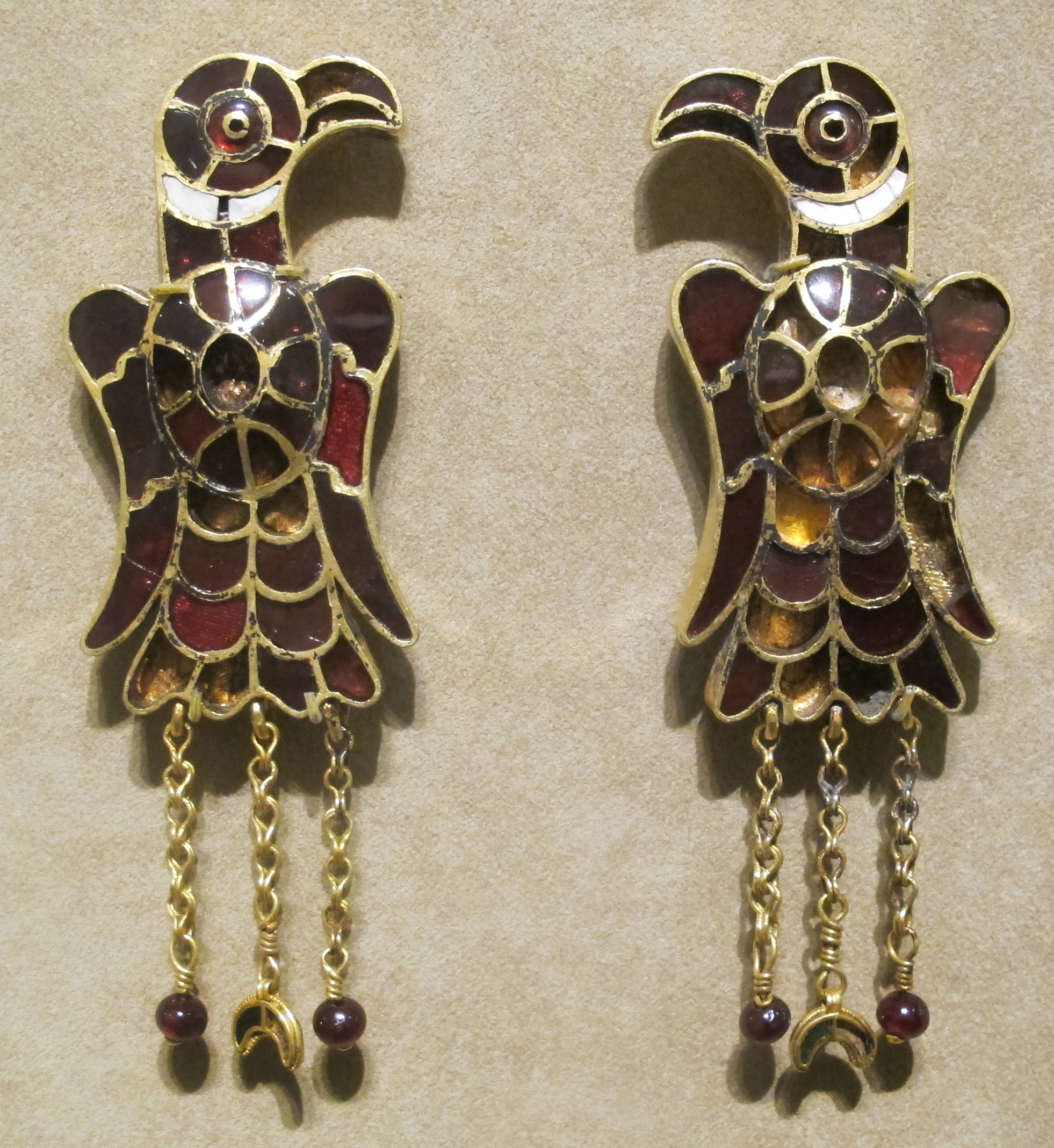
Ostrogoth ear jewels, Metropolitan Museum of Art

One historiographical tradition from the early 20th century credited the Ostrogoths with assimilating Greek and Asian artistic influences in the Pontic steppe, inventing runes there, and ultimately producing distinctive decorative art in Italy. During their two centuries in southern Russia, they may have helped shape what became Teutonic art before the Hunnic invasions of 376. However, modern scholars are less certain about such influences and claim instead that early Ostrogothic art primarily featured utilitarian objects and jewellery, with ornamental patterning and animal style comparable to other migration-period work and little is known about their work prior to their settlement on the Italian Peninsula.

The Ostrogothic king of Italy, Theodoric—ruling from the historic heart of the empire like his Frankish contemporaries and later Lombard successors—adapted Roman architecture, imagery, and ceremonial not only to legitimize his rule but also to express an enduring Ostrogothic artistic identity. He also chose a tomb design that connected him to the artistic commemoration of rulers like Constantine, founder of the Christian Empire, and the Honorian dynasty, his Italian predecessors. This reflected the Ostrogothic synthesis of Roman imperial artistic forms with Germanic tradition. This is not to suggest that Theodoric and the Ostrogoths under his command were merely aping the Romans, since "in all known artistic representations" of the Germanic king, "the princeps stands independently". This implied to onlookers that the glory and dominion represented by Theodoric's likeness were his alone and "did not complement" the Eastern emperor's greater authority, despite claims otherwise.

== 6th-century Scandinavian Ostrogoths (Jordanes) ==
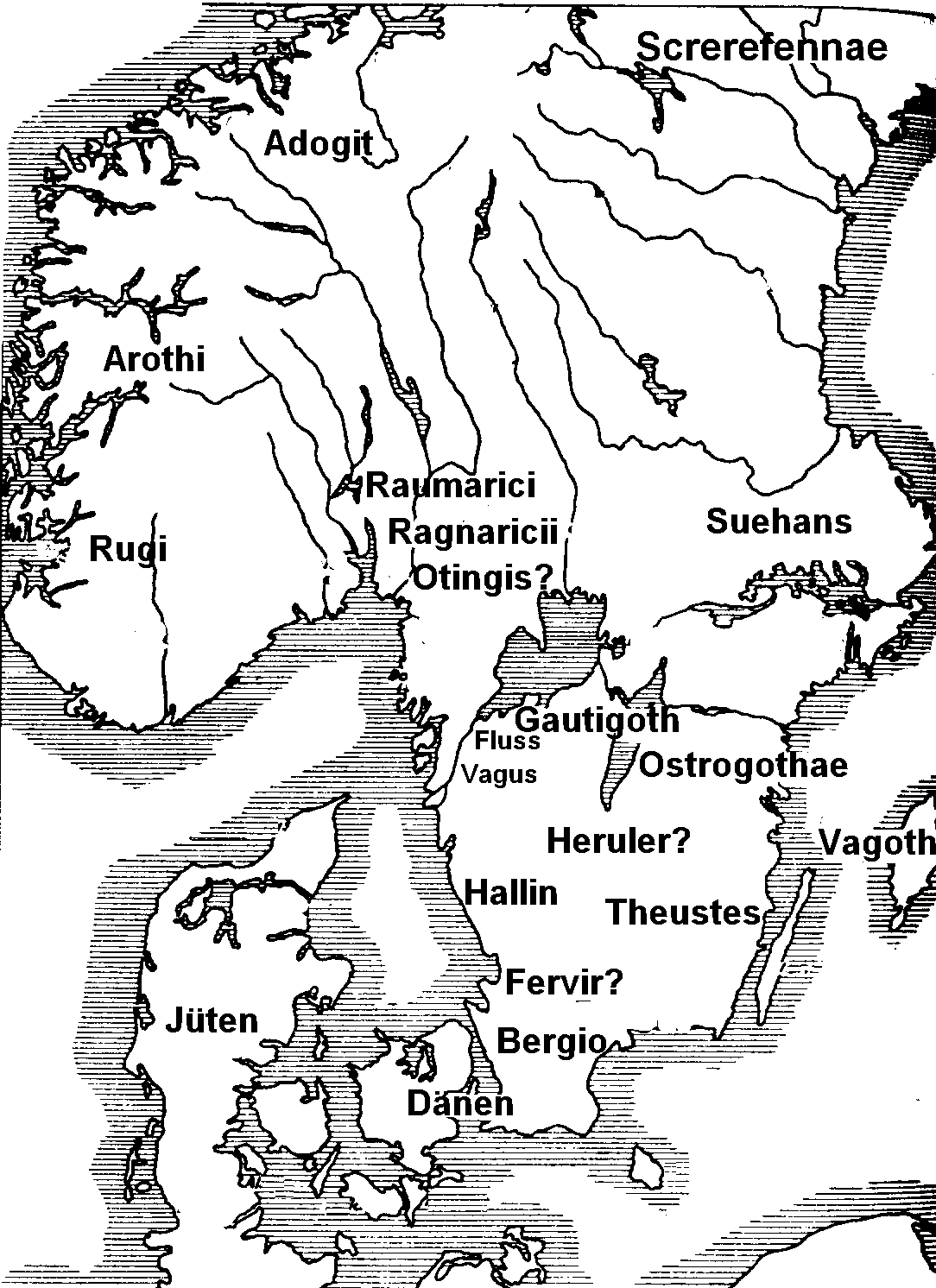
Possible map of Scandza based on Jordanes's work

Jordanes named a people called the Ostrogoths (Ostrogothae) in a list of many peoples living on the large island of "Scandza", north of the mouth of the Vistula, which most modern scholars understand to refer to the Scandinavian peninsula. The implication was that these Ostrogoths were living there in the 6th century, during the lifetime of Jordanes or his source Cassiodorus—the same period when there was a powerful Ostrogothic kingdom in Italy. The list itself mentions a Roduulf, king of the Ranii who lived in Scandza near the Dani (Danes). It says he had despised his own kingdom and came to Italy and then received the embrace of Theoderic the Great there. This Roduulf has thus been proposed as a possible source of information about Scandinavian peoples, because Cassiodorus was an important statesman at Theoderic's court. (Note: It has even been suggested that Roduulf is the same king of that name who is known from other sources to have been king of the Danube Heruli until he was defeated by the Lombards some time between 494 and 508. Procopius and Paul the Deacon mention him, and Jordanes mentions a king of the Heruli in this period who was adopted as a son in arms by Theoderic, without naming him. Strikingly, Procopius mentions that some of the Heruli nobility migrated to Scandinavia after the defeat of Roduulf, and some of these later returned to the Balkan area (Gothic Wars, VI, 14–15), while in his Scandza list, Jordanes mentions that Heruli had lived near the Dani, like the Ostrogothae he mentions, but had been forced to leave.)

On the other hand, scholars have come to no consensus about when the list was made, and by whom, nor how to interpret most of the names in the list. Arne Søby Christensen, in his detailed analysis lists three possibilities:

- that Jordanes believed some Ostrogoths had emigrated north, or...
- that a similar name "Eastern Goths" had been coined in Scandinavia, where there were a people with the related name, the Gauts, or...
- that a source of Jordanes, for example Cassiodorus, had created this form of the name, perhaps having heard of the Gauts.

It has been pointed out by Walter Goffart that Jordanes (V.38) also digresses specially to criticize stories going around Constantinople, that the Goths had once been slaves in Britain or another northern island, and had been freed for the price of a nag. Goffart argues that Jordanes likely rejected the idea that the Goths should be simply sent north to their alleged land of origin. Goffart points out that Procopius—a contemporary of Jordanes—reports that Belisarius offered Britain to the Ostrogoths (Gothic Wars, VI, 6); Goffart also suggests this may be connected to the stories mentioned by Jordanes.

Fundamental to the question of the Scandza list, which mentions the Ostrogothae, there has been much scholarly discussion about why Jordanes claimed that Scandinavia was a "womb of the nations", and the point of origin to not only the Goths but also many other northern barbarian peoples. Before Jordanes, there was already a Judaeo-Christian tradition equating the Goths and other "Scythian" peoples with the descendants of Gog and Magog, who readers of the Book of Ezekiel and the Book of Revelation might otherwise associate with distant islands.

== Gothic identity as a Roman-constructed political category ==
The ethnic identity of both the Ostrogoths and Visigoths during the late antique period should not be understood as a direct continuation of some biologically stable "Germanic" lineage. Instead, as historian Ian Wood emphasizes—drawing on the work of Patrick Amory—Gothic identity in the West was a flexible and politicized construct, fashioned through Roman political categories, military patronage, and cultural performance. Particularly under Theodoric, Gothicness functioned as an integrative label, rooted less in ancestral continuity than in court ritual, legal status, and strategic uses of ethnicity. This performative and administrative character of Gothic identity challenges nationalist historiographies that have projected later ethnic essentialism retroactively onto the Goths of Late Antiquity.

== Ostrogothic rulers ==
=== Amal dynasty ===
- Valamir r. 447–c. 465 succeeded by his brother...
- Theodemir r. c. 465–475 succeeded by his son...
- Theodoric the Great r. 471–526 succeeded by his maternal grandson...
- Athalaric r. 526–534 succeeded by his mother...
- Amalasuntha, r. 534–535 the daughter of Theodoric, succeeded by her first cousin...
- Theodahad r. 535–536 the son of Theodoric's sister, succeeded by his first cousin-in-law once removed...
- Witiges r. 536–540 son-in-law of Amalasuntha

=== Later kings ===
- Ildibad r. 540–541
- Eraric r. 541
- Totila r. 541–552 nephew of Ildibad
- Teia r. 552–553

== See also ==
- List of Germanic tribes
- Crimean Goths
- Oium
- Wielbark culture
