= Triarius =

Triarius was a Gothic nobleman and soldier. He was a member of the Amali dynasty. At least by the Battle of Nedao, Triarius had withdrawn his support from Valamir, who was his relative and the king of the Ostrogoths. Triarius joined the Eastern Roman army, where he rose to a prominent position. His sister was married to the powerful general Aspar. Triarius was the father of Theodoric Strabo. Triarius probably died in the 450s, and was succeeded by his son as leader of the Thracian Goths.

== Sources ==
- Wolfram, Herwig (1990). History of the Goths. University of California Press. ISBN 0520069838.
