= Theodoric Strabo =

Ostrogoth chieftain

Theodoric (or Theoderic) Strabo (Latin: Theodericus; died 481) was a Gothic chieftain who was involved in the politics of the Eastern Roman Empire during the reigns of Emperors Leo I, Zeno and Basiliscus. He was a rival for the leadership of the Ostrogoths with his kinsman Theoderic the Great, who would ultimately supplant him.

== Background ==
Theodoric called Strabo, son of Triarius, was a chieftain of the Thracian Goths (Thervingi, Bastarnae and Roxolane in Getea and Peuce island in the Danube delta); he had two brothers. Strabo means "cross-eyed" in Latin. The wife of the Alan general Aspar was his sister. Strabo had a wife, Sigilda, and a son called Recitach. He was a contemporary of the more famous Theodoric the Amal, who was a Moesian Goth of the royal Amal family, and who would become known as Theoderic the Great. Around 459, he is attested as in friendly relationship with the Byzantine Empire, possibly one of the foederati, and receiving an annual subsidy from the Byzantines.

== Under Leo I ==
In 471, the Alan Aspar, at the time magister militum of Emperor Leo I, was murdered by order of the emperor himself. Strabo, who was at the command of his people in Thrace, revolted to avenge his relative, but was defeated by the Byzantine generals Zeno and Basiliscus, who were both later emperors. However, Strabo was able to set three conditions to end his unrest: receiving the properties left as legacy by Aspar, being allowed to settle his Goths in Thrace, and being raised to the rank of magister militum. Since Leo had rejected the requests, offering the rank of magister militum only in exchange of an oath of loyalty, Strabo started a military campaign against the cities of Thrace. Part of the Gothic army attacked Philippi (or Philippopolis), while he led the remaining men to attack and occupy Arcadiopolis. When the Goths ran out of supplies, Strabo signed a peace with Leo (473); according to its terms the Byzantines were to pay an annual tribute of 2000 pounds of gold to the Goths, whose independence was recognized, and Strabo was to obtain the rank of magister militum.

== Under Zeno ==
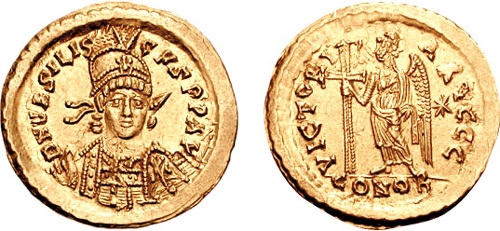
Solidus of Emperor Basiliscus. Theodoric Strabo played a role in the overthrowing of Emperor Zeno in 475, and in the rise to power of Basiliscus. The new emperor kept Strabo on his side as magister militum, but Strabo was soon upset by some decisions made by Basiliscus, and is not reported to have defended Constantinople the following year, when Zeno returned to take back his throne.

At the death of Leo (January 474), Strabo rebelled against the newly appointed Emperor Zeno. He killed Heraclius, the magister militum per Thracias, despite the payment of a ransom, probably because Heraclius was involved in the murder of Aspar. The support of Strabo was fundamental for the overthrowing of Zeno and the rise of Basiliscus to the Byzantine throne (475), so Basiliscus confirmed him magister militum and gave him other honours. However, Strabo was very upset when Basiliscus appointed his nephew Armatus magister militum praesentialis, because he despised him. When Zeno returned to Constantinople in 476 and defeated Basiliscus, Strabo is not reported to defend the city.

In 476/477, Zeno allied himself with Strabo's rival, Theodoric the Amal, and ordered him to attack Strabo. Strabo sent an embassy to the Byzantine emperor, offering peace and blaming Theodoric Amal. Zeno understood that this offering was hiding further conspiracies, and obtained that the Byzantine senate and army declare Strabo a public enemy.

The plan of Zeno was to have the two Theoderics attack each other. He sent the Amal against Strabo, with the promise of a huge Roman force as renforcement (478). When Theoderic the Amal arrived through the mountains at Mount Soundis, he did not find the Roman renforcement army he expected, but Theoderic Strabo's army instead, in a strongly fortified camp. Strabo provoked the Amal, running in front of the Moesian Gothic camp and claiming that the leadership of the Amal had reduced the Goths to fighting each other, and only for the Roman gain, to have none of the wealth for which they had moved from their territories. With this speech recalling the common interest of the Goths, Strabo forced the Amal to ask for peace. The two Theodorics agreed to put forward a joint request to the Roman Emperor, in order to extend to the south the settlement territory of the Goths in Moesia.

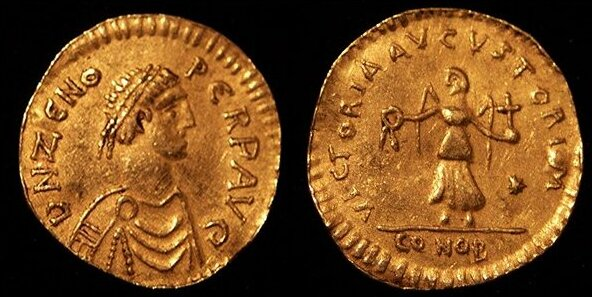
Emperor Zeno, here depicted on one of his coins, tried to pit the two Theodorics against each other, but Strabo settled a peace with the Amali and defeated the Bulgars, who had been sent against him by Zeno.

Zeno tried to divide the two Theodorics, bribing Amal, who refused to misally. The imperial army obtained some initial successes, however Zeno did not capitalize upon his victory, and allowed the Amal to move westward in Thrace, plundering the territories as he went. With the Amal far away, Strabo accepted an agreement with Zeno: Strabo was to be given back his wealth, money to pay 13,000 soldiers, the command of two palatinae units, and the title once more of magister militum. However, the army of Theodoric Strabo, 30,000-men strong was still a menace for Zeno, who convinced the Bulgars to attack the Thracian Goths in their own base. Strabo defeated the Bulgars in 480/481, and moved towards Constantinople, but he had to deal with problems with his own men, so he could not capitalize upon his victory and was forced to return to Greece. On his way back, during an encampment at Stabulum Diomedis, near Philippi in Thrace, he was trying to break in an unruly horse, when he fell onto a spear hung before a tent or hanging from a wagon and died.
