= Thracian Goths =

Goth branch

The Thracian Goths, also known as Moesogoths or Moesian Goths, refers to the branches of Goths who settled in Thrace and Moesia, Roman provinces in the Balkans. These Goths were mentioned in the 4th, 5th and 6th centuries.

== History ==
Emperor Valens (r. 364–378) settled Goths in Moesia and planned to use them for protection. In 382, the Thervingi received land in Moesia by treaty with Roman emperor Theodosius I.

In the 460s, the Thracian Goths were recognized foederati (barbarian military aid to the Romans) of the Eastern Roman Empire, and seem to have prospered. They had an annual subsidy, and some influence due to their proximity to nearby Constantinople. In 471, the Thracian Goths under Theodoric Strabo revolted after fearing they would be removed, Emperor Leo having come under the influence of his son-in-law, general Zeno. Two years later the Pannonian Goths (Ostrogoths) under Theodemir decided to move into Thrace, presumably wanting to share the benefits of the Thracian Goths. Leo made agreements with both Gothic groups, settling the Goths under Theodemir in Macedonia and renewing Strabo's subsidy and elevating him to magister militium. Zeno succeeded Leo after his death in 474, while Strabo supported a coup staged by Leo's widow to put her brother Basiliscus on the throne; however, Zeno won back power in 476 with his Isaurian troops.

In 476/77, Zeno allied himself with Theodoric Strabo's rival, Theoderic the Great or Theoderic the Amal (r. 474–526), the successor of Theodemir, and ordered him to attack Strabo. The leader of the Thracian Goths sent an embassy to the Byzantine emperor, offering peace and blaming the Amal. Zeno believed that this offering was hiding further conspiracies, and obtained that the Byzantine senate and army declare Strabo a public enemy. Zeno planned to have the two Theoderics attack each other. He sent the Amal against Strabo, with the promise of a huge East Roman force as reinforcement (478). The Ostrogoths under king Theoderic advanced as far as Marcianopolis in Thrace in 478. The Moesian Goths prepared to cross the Balkan Mountains (Sondis), and were then told that their Roman gold awaited south of the mountain. Theoderic the Amal did not find the Roman reinforcement army he expected, but Theoderic Strabo's army instead, in a strongly fortified camp. Strabo provoked the Amal, running in front of the Moesian Gothic camp and claiming that the leadership of the Amal had reduced the Goths to fighting each other, and only for the Roman gain, to have none of the wealth for which they had moved from their territories. With this speech recalling the common interest of the Goths, Strabo forced the Amal to ask for peace. The two Theodorics agreed to put forward a joint request to the Emperor, in order to extend Moesian Gothic territory to the south. At this point, the Thracian Goths effectively joined Theodoric the Amal and vanished from the historical record as a distinct group. Only a small number of individuals, unwilling to join the Amal, remained in the East into the sixth century.

According to Jordanes (fl. 551), the Moesian Goths were taught to write by Ulfilas (311–383). They were, according to him, still present in Moesia, "numerous, but poor and unwarlike, rich in nothing save flocks of various kinds and pasture-lands for cattle and forests for wood ... Most of them drink milk".

== Sources ==
- Wolfram, Herwig; Dunlap, Thomas J. (1990). History of the Goths. University of California Press. pp. 271–. ISBN 978-0-520-06983-1.
- James, Edward (2014). Europe's Barbarians AD 200-600. Routledge. pp. 221–. ISBN 978-1-317-86825-5.
