= Aspar =

Eastern Roman patrician (fl. 400–471) 400–471)

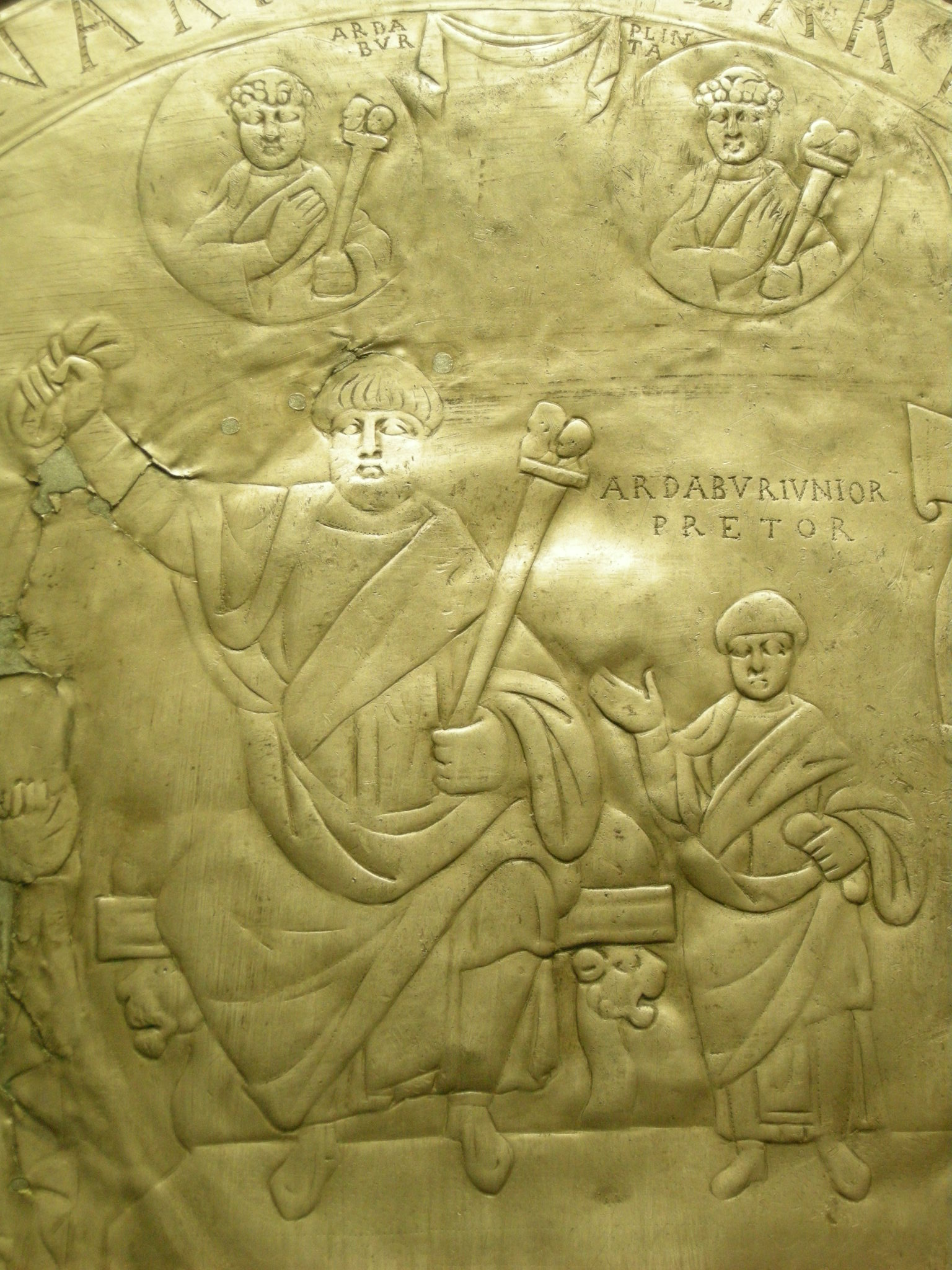
Detail of a dish depicting Aspar and his elder son Ardabur (c. 434)

Flavius Ardabur Aspar (Greek: Ἄσπαρ, fl. 400 – 471) was an Eastern Roman patrician and magister militum ("master of soldiers") of Alanic-Gothic descent. As the general of a Germanic army in Roman service, Aspar exerted great influence on the Eastern Roman Emperors for half a century, from the 420s to his death in 471, through the reigns of Theodosius II, Marcian and Leo I, who, in the end, had him killed. His death led to the ending of the Germanic domination of Eastern Roman policy.

== Biography ==
Aspar was born the son of the magister Ardaburius, and was of Alanic-Gothic descent. The name Aspar (Avestan: Aspari) in Iranian languages means "Horse-rider". Aspar played a crucial role in his father's expedition in 424 to defeat the Western usurper Joannes of Ravenna and to install Galla Placidia and her son, Valentinian III, in his place. He also helped to negotiate a peace treaty with Geiseric after the Vandal invasion of Africa.

Aspar attained the consulship in 434 after campaigning in Africa. However, Aspar could not become emperor because of his Arian religion. Instead, he played the role of kingmaker with his subordinate Marcian, who became emperor by marrying Theodosius II's sister Pulcheria.

On 27 January 457 Marcian died, and the political and military establishment figures of the Eastern court took eleven days to choose a successor. Despite the presence of a strong candidate to the purple, the magister militum and Marcian's son-in-law Anthemius, the choice was quite different. Aspar, who in this occasion was probably offered the throne by the senate but refused, could have chosen his own son Ardabur, but instead selected an obscure tribune of one of his military units, Leo I. The account of Leo's coronation ceremony records a "foremost patrician" sitting in the chariot with Leo during the procession and a "leading senator" offering him a golden crown at the Forum of Constantine. Aspar is suspected to be both of these.

In 470, in an episode of the struggle for power between Aspar and the Isaurian general Zeno, Aspar persuaded the emperor to appoint his second son, Patricius, as caesar and give him in marriage his daughter Leontia. However, since the clergy and people of Constantinople did not consider an Arian eligible to become emperor, at the news of the appointment riots broke out in the city hippodrome, led by the head of the Sleepless Monks, Marcellus. Aspar and Leo had to promise to the bishops that Patricius would convert to Orthodoxy before becoming emperor, and only after the conversion would he marry Leontia.

In 471 an imperial conspiracy organized by Leo I and the Isaurians caused the death of Aspar and of his elder son Ardabur. It is possible that Patricius died on this occasion, although some sources report that he recovered from his wounds. His death led to the ending of the Germanic domination of Eastern Roman policy.

Aspar had another son, Ermanaric, with the sister of Theodoric Strabo and daughter of Triarius. Aspar's wife was an Ostrogoth, as the Ostrogoth King Theodoric the Great was her nephew. A cistern attributed to Aspar still exists today in Istanbul.

== Notes ==
| Preceded by Theodosius Augustus XIV, Petronius Maximus | Roman consul 434 with Areobindus | Succeeded by Theodosius Augustus XV, Placidus Valentinianus Augustus IV |
