= Basiliscus (Caesar) =

Eastern Roman Caesar

- Caesar of the Eastern Roman Empire
- Reign: 476 – 477/478 AD (under Zeno)
- Born: Basiliscus
- Father: Armatus

Basiliscus (Greek: Βασιλίσκος) was the only son of the Eastern Roman military commander Armatus and was briefly caesar of the Eastern Roman Empire in 476–477/478. After the death of Eastern Roman Emperor Leo (r. 457–474) in 474, his grandson Leo II (r. 474) took the throne. Leo II died in the same year and his father, Zeno (r. 474–475, 476–491), ascended the throne. Soon after Zeno's ascension, Basiliscus' great-uncle, similarly named Basiliscus (r. 475–476), forced Zeno into exile and took the throne himself. However, Basiliscus soon lost support with Armatus, who betrayed him by arranging a deal with Zeno: Armatus would hold the rank of magister militum praesentalis for life, and the younger Basiliscus would be made caesar. Caesar was a senior imperial title, and implied that the holder was the heir to the throne. Although Basiliscus was crowned in late 476, Zeno soon moved against Basiliscus's father, executing Armatus and exiling Basiliscus to Blachernae on the Golden Horn as a church lector. Later in his life, Basiliscus became a priest and the bishop of Cyzicus. He may have survived into the reign of Justinian (r. 527–565).

He is involved in the chronicle of Victor of Tunnuna, who suggests that Basiliscus and Leo II are the same person, claiming that Leo II's mother Ariadne (r. 474–475, 476–515) faked his death. The historian Brian Croke argues the story was false, considering this an attempt by Victor to explain the existence of a living Leo, as this was possibly the regnal name of the younger Basiliscus.

== Life ==
Basiliscus was the son of Armatus, the magister militum per Thracias of the Eastern Roman Empire, born c. 470. Armatus was the nephew of Empress Verina (r. 457–474) and future Emperor Basiliscus (r. 475–476).

=== Background ===
When Eastern Roman Emperor Leo (r. 457–474) fell ill in 473, he had his grandson, Leo II (r. 474), the son of Zeno (r. 474–475, 476–491), and Ariadne (r. 474–475, 476–515), crowned as emperor in October 473. Leo died on 18 January 474, and Leo II took the throne. Zeno was installed as co-emperor and crowned on 29 January; when Leo II died in the autumn, Zeno became the sole eastern emperor. Zeno was not well received, with him being among both the common people and the senatorial class, in part simply because he was an Isaurian—a race with a poor reputation — and partly because of fears he would promote Isaurians to high positions. Although Verina had supported Zeno's elevation as co-emperor, she turned against Zeno once he became sole emperor. Verina conspired to usurp him as emperor, and historians generally accept that she planned to install her lover and magister officiorum, Patricius, as emperor and to marry him. (Note: This narrative is challenged by Kamilla Twardowska, who views it more likely that this is propaganda from Candidus, repeated by John of Antioch. Instead, she argues that Patricius was likely a key political ally of Verina, but, given the revolt was likely influenced by the desire to retain dynastic power, not a plausible candidate for the throne.) She was supported by the general Theoderic Strabo and her brother Basiliscus, who succeeded in recruiting Illus and Trocundes, as well as Armatus. The conspiracy was successful, as Zeno fled to Isauria on 9 January 475, either after learning of the conspiracy or after being convinced by Verina that his life was in danger. Basiliscus convinced the senate to acclaim him emperor, instead of Patricius.

Emperor Basiliscus quickly lost support in Constantinople due to heavy taxes, heretical ecclesiastical policies, and a natural disaster viewed as a sign of divine wrath by himself. While Basiliscus's rise was legal, as usurpations confirmed by the senate were considered legitimate, such flaws had not occurred for over a century in the Eastern Roman Empire. Additionally, he was politically incompetent and temperamental, alienating much of his support. While Basiliscus was initially supported by the elites of the Eastern Roman Empire, he never gained a favorable reputation amongst the common people, weakening his legitimacy; his conflicts with the Patriarch of Constantinople, Acacius reduced his support from the people of Constantinople, who were heavily Chalcedonian. Basiliscus was forced to levy heavy taxes by the near-bankruptcy of the Empire, and sold off public positions for money. He utilized the praefectus urbi Epinicus, a former ally of Verina, to extort money from the church. Verina turned against Emperor Basiliscus after the execution of her lover and began to plot to return Zeno to power; she later sought refuge in Blachernae. It is not known if she fled because she had already commenced plotting Basiliscus's overthrow and feared his discovering the scheme, or began to support Zeno's return after she fled. She remained there until after Emperor Basiliscus died.

Emperor Basiliscus had Armatus made magister militum praesentalis allegedly at the insistence of his wife Zenonis. This turned Theoderic Strabo against him, as he hated Armatus. Armatus was also made consul in 476, alongside Emperor Basiliscus. Illus and Trocundes, who were laying siege to Zeno in Isauria, defected to him. Illus, possibly buoyed by his hold over Zeno, by way of his brother's imprisonment, arranged to ally with him and marched towards Constantinople with their combined forces. Emperor Basiliscus ordered Armatus to take command of all the troops in Thrace and Constantinople, as well as the palace guard, and led them against the three. In spite of his oath of loyalty, Armatus betrayed Basiliscus when Zeno offered to have him made magister militum praesentalis for life, and his son Basiliscus crowned as caesar and heir.

=== Caesarship ===
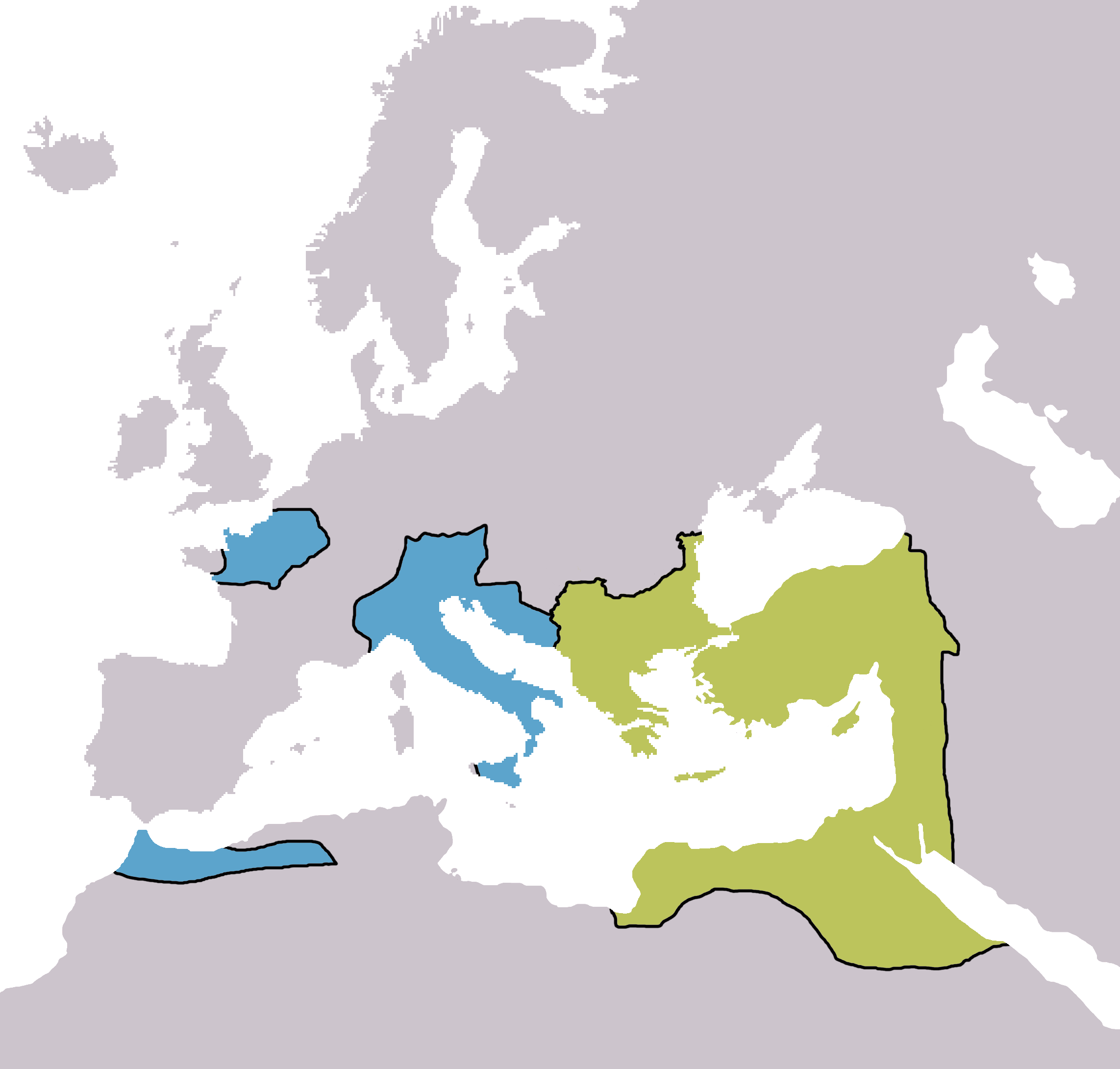
A map of Europe in A.D. 476, showing the extent of the Eastern (green) and Western (blue) sections of the Roman Empire

Basiliscus was likely traveling with his father Armatus, and thus on the path to Constantinople; Basiliscus was crowned caesar at the imperial palace of Nicaea in late 476. The historian Brian Croke remarks that the coronation was "doubtless with all of the usual ritual and splendor." Zeno and Basiliscus then took a ship to Constantinople, while Armatus marched into Isauria. Zeno and Basiliscus entered Constantinople unopposed in August 476. The elder Basiliscus and his family fled and took refuge in a church, only leaving once Zeno promised not to execute them. Zeno exiled them to Limnae in Cappadocia, (Note: Victor of Tunnuna gives the location as Sasima, and Evagrius Scholasticus and J. B. Bury give the location as Cucusus.) where they were imprisoned in a dried-up cistern and left to starve to death. According to some sources, they were alternatively beheaded. Zeno and Basiliscus then officiated games held at the Hippodrome of Constantinople and praised the victorious chariot-riders, which Croke called "a customary but vital gesture for reinforcing legitimacy". Given the controversial political associations of his name, it may have been changed to Leo, and potentially referred to as such on coins.

Croke comments that after Zeno re-established himself in Constantinople, he began to consider the position of Armatus, and evaluated that his support was "extremely fragile". Armatus had pledged to serve the previous emperor, only to betray him when he sensed an opportunity for advancement. With Basiliscus as caesar and thereby heir apparent, Croke comments that Zeno must have seen that Armatus might consider working to accelerate the succession by removing Zeno. Taking decisive action, Zeno had Armatus killed, but spared the life of the young Basiliscus. Basiliscus was instead sent to become a lector at a church at Blachernae on the Golden Horn. Croke considers this a "safe and usual course of action", noting the recent precedents of Western Roman Emperors Avitus (r. 455–456), sent to become bishop of Placentia, and Glycerius (r. 473–474), who was made Bishop of Salona. He further notes that the young age of Basiliscus would not be an impediment, as it was not uncommon at the time for lectors to be young. The narrative of Basiliscus' employment as a lector is relayed solely by the contemporary historian Candidus Isaurus, whose work is preserved by Photius. Theophanes the Confessor, writing based upon a reliable source — which Croke remarks may be lost fragments of Malalas — explains that it was Zeno's wife Ariadne who interceded on Basiliscus' behalf as a result of their ancestries, as she was a cousin to Armatus. The length of Basiliscus' tenure at Blachernae is unknown, but he later became the bishop of Cyzicus, and was reportedly very capable. Croke posits that this capability would mean that it was two or three decades after being deposed that Basiliscus came to be bishop, between the age of thirty and forty. After this point, little is known of Basiliscus; it is unknown when he died, or if he remained bishop at the time of his death, but he likely lived until the reign of Justinian (r. 527–565). The theory that he held the position of bishop later in his life is stated explicitly by Nikephoros Kallistos Xanthopoulos, drawing on now-lost contemporary sources. He may have retired from a church in Constantinople, possibly in Blachernae, after serving as bishop of Cyzicus.

== Possible relationship with Leo II ==
The Chronicle of Victor of Tunnuna, which Croke considers "an otherwise relatively careful and accurate work" contains an entry that contradicts the history of Leo II's death, stating that Leo did not die in 474, but rather his mother Ariadne feared for his life and substituted him with a similar-looking boy. According to this narrative, Leo was hidden away in a local church, and lived until the reign of Justinian. Croke remarks that it is questionable for the story to appear in a source of such quality, especially from a man who lived in a monastery in Constantinople itself during the reign of Justinian. He further remarks that the tale appears to be repeated throughout the capital's monasteries — and possibly streets — and therefore was spread to Victor directly, reliably enough that he believed it was correct. Croke remarks that if Basiliscus lived until the reign of Justinian, he would have been in his mid-fifties at the latest, and likely a figure that drew "local fame and attention" as a deposed emperor. In spite of this, his clerical role would have removed any threat he posed to Justinian. Croke comments that the coincidence between Basiliscus and the narrative surrounding Leo is "suspicious": Where Leo was a boy-emperor supposedly hidden away in a church in the capital, at the instigation of Ariadne, Basiliscus was proven to be the true boy-emperor. Victor states that the allegedly surviving Leo was an ordained member of the regular church, rather than a mere monk; he suggests that Leo only lived into the early reign of Justinian. As Croke notes, no other figure could have been the surviving Leo: no other emperors or rival claimants were alive by the rule of Justinian, let alone the smaller number of boy emperors. For these reasons, Croke concludes that there is no "worthwhile reason" to reject the information provided by Victor, and that rather than complicate the matter by requiring Basiliscus to also be called Leo, if potentially proven true, would "provide the most satisfactory solution thus far to a notorious riddle of late Roman numismatics".

The particular riddle relates to the continuity of issued coinage: When Leo I first elevated Leo II to the rank of augustus, the solidi issued depicted both; during the succession of events including deaths and revolts, solidi chronologically bore the images of Leo II alone, Leo II and Zeno, Zeno by himself, Basiliscus, (Note: Although there are no known coins from Basiliscus' sole rule.) Basiliscus and Marcus, and then back to Zeno. However, solidi and tremisses dated to the precise period after the reign of Basiliscus bear the image of Emperor Zeno and a Caesar Leo. Several scholars have put forth explanations for the coins: Some earlier modern scholars suggested earlier attribution to the joint rule of emperors Zeno and Leo II, and the numismatist Oscar Ulrich-Bansa points out that without historical records, Leo II and Zeno were jointly raised to the position of caesars under Leo I. However, subsequent research has disproved these theories by affirmatively dating the coins to a period subsequent to Basiliscus and Marcus' reign: several of the tremisses were struck from a die that had earlier struck coins for Basiliscus and Marcus, and continuity exists between the two depictions. For these reasons, the numismatist John Kent states "Clearly, Zeno and Leo...were either contemporary with, or immediately followed, the reign of Basiliscus and Marcus". With no extant coins dating to the joint rule of emperor Zeno and caesar Basiliscus, some have dated the outlying coins to this period; the early numismatist Nicolas Damas Marchant, for example, has been accepted by the Byzantinist Ernst Stein, and implicitly so by the authors of the Prosopography of the Later Roman Empire. However, recent numismatic scholarship has tended to align with the conclusion of Kent — that these coins represent Zeno and Leo, otherwise unknown sons of Basiliscus — who raised them to caesars when he elevated Marcus to augustus; it is known for certain that Basiliscus had other children, although their names have been lost. He argues the possibility that the coins represent complementary coins, rather than subsequent ones, and admits that no "documentary evidence" exists, but posits that Zeno and Leo are both likely names for Basiliscus' sons, given that he was husband to Zenonis and brother to Leo I's widow. Croke argues that Kent's reluctance to affirmatively state that Zeno and Leo represent sons of Basiliscus is understandable with almost no literary evidence that any of his other children were even male, aside from the oddity of the dies of Basiliscus and Marcus being struck out if they are meant to be complimentary coins. Therefore, Croke considers Kent's theory to be "at best, inconclusive."

Croke offers an explanation that Victor, or the tradition he was following, was put into a position where he had to explain the presence of a former boy-emperor named Leo in the face of his death, and thus was forced to mention the first to explain the second. It is therefore possible, Croke argues, that Eastern Roman common knowledge, having forgotten about the brief reign of the younger Basiliscus — also known as Leo — invented a story that Leo II survived to explain the existence of the former boy emperor. Croke states that Victor would understandably doubt the established facts surrounding Leo II, concluding that the narrative does not represent a willful invention, but rather the best efforts of a chronicler. The narrative might serve at least to confirm that the younger Basiliscus reigned under the name of Leo and lived into the reign of Justinian.

== Sources ==
=== Bibliography ===
- Burgess, William Douglas (1992). "Isaurian Factions in the Reign of Zeno the Isaurian". Latomus. 51 (4): 874–880. JSTOR 41536458.
- Bury, J.B. (1923). Bill Thayer (ed.). History of the Later Roman Empire from the Death of Theodosius I to the Death of Justinian. New York: Dover Publications. ISBN 978-0-4861-4338-5.
- Croke, Brian (1983). "Basiliscus the Boy-Emperor". Greek, Roman, and Byzantine Studies. 24 (1): 81–91. ISSN 2159-3159.
- Croke, Brian (2004). "The Imperial Reigns of Leo II". Byzantinische Zeitschrift. 96 (2): 559–575. doi:10.1515/BYZS.2003.559. S2CID 191460505.
- Elton, Hugh (1998a). "Flavius Basiliscus (AD 475–476)". De Imperatoribus Romanis. Archived from the original on 8 July 2021.
- Elton, Hugh (1998b). "Roman Emperors – DIR Basiliscus (Leo) Caesar". www.roman-emperors.org. Archived from the original on 22 January 2022.
- Friell, Gerard; Williams, Stephen (2005). The Rome that Did Not Fall: The Survival of the East in the Fifth Century. London: Routledge. ISBN 978-1-134-73545-7.
- Jones, Arnold Hugh Martin; Martindale, J. R.; Morris, J. (1980). The Prosopography of the Later Roman Empire: Volume 2, AD 395–527. Cambridge: Cambridge University Press. ISBN 978-0-521-20159-9.
- Kazhdan, Alexander P. (1991). The Oxford Dictionary of Byzantium. Oxford: Oxford University Press. ISBN 978-0-19-504652-6.
- Kulikowski, Michael (2019). The Tragedy of Empire: From Constantine to the Destruction of Roman Italy. Cambridge, Massachusetts: Harvard University Press. doi:10.4159/9780674242708. ISBN 978-0-674-24270-8. S2CID 213445912.
- Leszka, Mirosław Jerzy (2013). "The Career of Flavius Appalius Illus Trocundes". Byzantinoslavica: Revue internationale des Études Byzantines. 71 (1–2). ISSN 0007-7712.
- Osequeda, Jason (2018). Because it is New Rome: The Authority of the Patriarchate of Constantinople, 379–553 (Thesis). Chicago, Illinois: University of Chicago. doi:10.6082/M15H7DF0.
- Ostrogorsky, George (1956). History of The Byzantine State. New Brunswick, Canada: Rutgers University Press. ISBN 9780813511986. OCLC 422217218.
- Stein, Ernst (1959). Histoire du Bas-Empire: Volume 1. Paris, France: Desclée de Brouwer. OCLC 6752757.
- Twardowska, Kamilla (2014). "Empress Verina and the Events of 475-476". Byzantinoslavica - Revue internationale des Études Byzantines. 72 (1–2). ISSN 0007-7712.
