= Basiliscus =

Eastern Roman emperor from 475 to 476

- Emperor of the Romans
- A gold solidus bearing the image of Basiliscus and his son and co-emperor Marcus

Roman emperor of the East
- Reign: 9 January 475 – August 476
- Coronation: 12 January 475
- Predecessor: Zeno
- Successor: Zeno
- Co-emperors: Marcus; Julius Nepos (West, 475); Romulus (West, 475–476)
- Died: Limnae (modern-day Cappadocia, Turkey)
- Spouse: Zenonis
- Issue: Marcus
Regnal name
- Latin: Imperator Caesar Basiliscus Augustus; Ancient Greek: Αὐτοκράτωρ καῖσαρ Βασιλίσκος αὐγουστος
- Dynasty: Leonid

Basiliscus (Latin: Basiliscus; Ancient Greek: Βασιλίσκος, romanized: Basilískos; died 476/477) was Eastern Roman emperor from 9 January 475 to August 476. He became magister militum per Thracias in 464, under his brother-in-law, Emperor Leo I (r. 457–474). Basiliscus commanded the army for an invasion of the Vandal Kingdom in 468, which was defeated at the Battle of Cape Bon. There were accusations at the time that Basiliscus was bribed by Aspar, the magister militum; many historians dismiss this, instead concluding that Basiliscus was either incompetent or foolish for accepting Vandal King Gaiseric's offer of a truce, which the latter used to construct fireships. Basiliscus's defeat cost the Eastern Empire 130,000 pounds (59,000 kg) of gold, causing the empire to hover above bankruptcy for 30 years. When Basiliscus returned to Constantinople, he sought refuge in the Hagia Sophia. His sister, Empress Verina, secured a pardon for him and he left the church to retire in Neapolis.

When Emperor Leo died in 474, his grandson Leo II (r. 474) took power, but soon died; his father, Zeno (r. 474–475, 476–491) ascended the throne in the same year, in a politically precarious position. Verina conspired to install the magister officiorum Patricius, her lover, as emperor. This plot was supported by Basiliscus, who succeeded in recruiting Isaurian brothers Illus and Trocundes, as well as Verina's nephew Armatus. Zeno fled on 9 January 475, either after learning of the plot or after Verina warned him that his life was in danger. Although Patricius was Verina's intended successor, Basiliscus convinced the Eastern Roman Senate to acclaim him instead.

Basiliscus quickly lost the support of his subjects and of his allies in court. Verina was alienated by the execution of Patricius, while the people objected to a combination of heavy taxes, heretical policies, and a natural disaster viewed as divine wrath for said heretical views. In an attempt to increase support, Basiliscus embraced the miaphysites, restoring Timothy Ailuros as the Patriarch of Alexandria and Peter the Fuller as Patriarch of Antioch. He heeded their advice and issued an encyclical on 9 April 475 which promoted the first three ecumenical councils of the church: Nicaea, Constantinople, and Ephesus, and condemned the Council of Chalcedon and the Tome of Leo. The Patriarch of Constantinople, Acacius, strongly opposed him, and together with Daniel the Stylite, turned the population of Constantinople against Basiliscus.

Zeno, besieged by Illus and Trocundes in his homeland of Isauria, convinced the two generals to defect, and soon the three of them marched their troops toward the capital. Basiliscus ordered Armatus to intercept them, but Armatus also switched sides after Zeno promised to give him the position of magister militum praesentalis for life, and make his son Basiliscus caesar. With Armatus's defense force deliberately kept out of his way, Zeno entered Constantinople unopposed in August 476. Basiliscus and his family hid in a church until Zeno promised not to execute them; exiled to Limnae in Cappadocia, they were either beheaded or imprisoned in a dried-up cistern and left to starve to death.

== Life ==
=== Early life and family ===
Basiliscus was born at an unknown date, likely in the Balkans. He was the brother of future Empress Verina, the wife of East Roman Emperor Leo I (r. 457–474). Historian Stefan Krautschick argues that since Basiliscus's nephew, Armatus, was the brother of a barbarian named Odoacer, Basiliscus was therefore also the uncle of Odoacer and thus a barbarian; this argument has been opposed by historians Wolfram Brandes, and Hugh Elton. Elton remarks that Krautschick's argument relies upon a single fragmentary Greek source, making his argument acceptable, but ignores the total lack of contemporary sources mentioning his ethnicity or relationship to Odoacer. Basiliscus married Zenonis, and with her produced a son, Marcus. Zenonis's origins are unknown, but she may have been a miaphysite, as some authors credit her for pushing Basiliscus's religious policies. Basiliscus was also related by marriage to Emperor Julius Nepos (r. 474–475/480), as the uncle of Julius Nepos's wife. Zenonis is alleged to have taken Armatus, Basiliscus's nephew, as a lover. Byzantist J.B. Bury, summarizing sources from the Suda, Candidus, and Malchus states that:

Basiliscus permitted Armatus, inasmuch as he was a kinsman, to associate freely with the Empress Zenonis. Their intercourse became intimate, and as they were both persons of no ordinary beauty they became extravagantly enamoured of each other. They used to exchange glances of the eyes, they used constantly to turn their faces and smile at each other; and the passion which they were obliged to conceal was the cause of dule and teen. They confided their trouble to Daniel, an eunuch, and to Maria, a midwife, who hardly healed their malady by the remedy of bringing them together. Then Zenonis coaxed Basiliscus to grant her lover the highest office in the city.

=== Military career ===
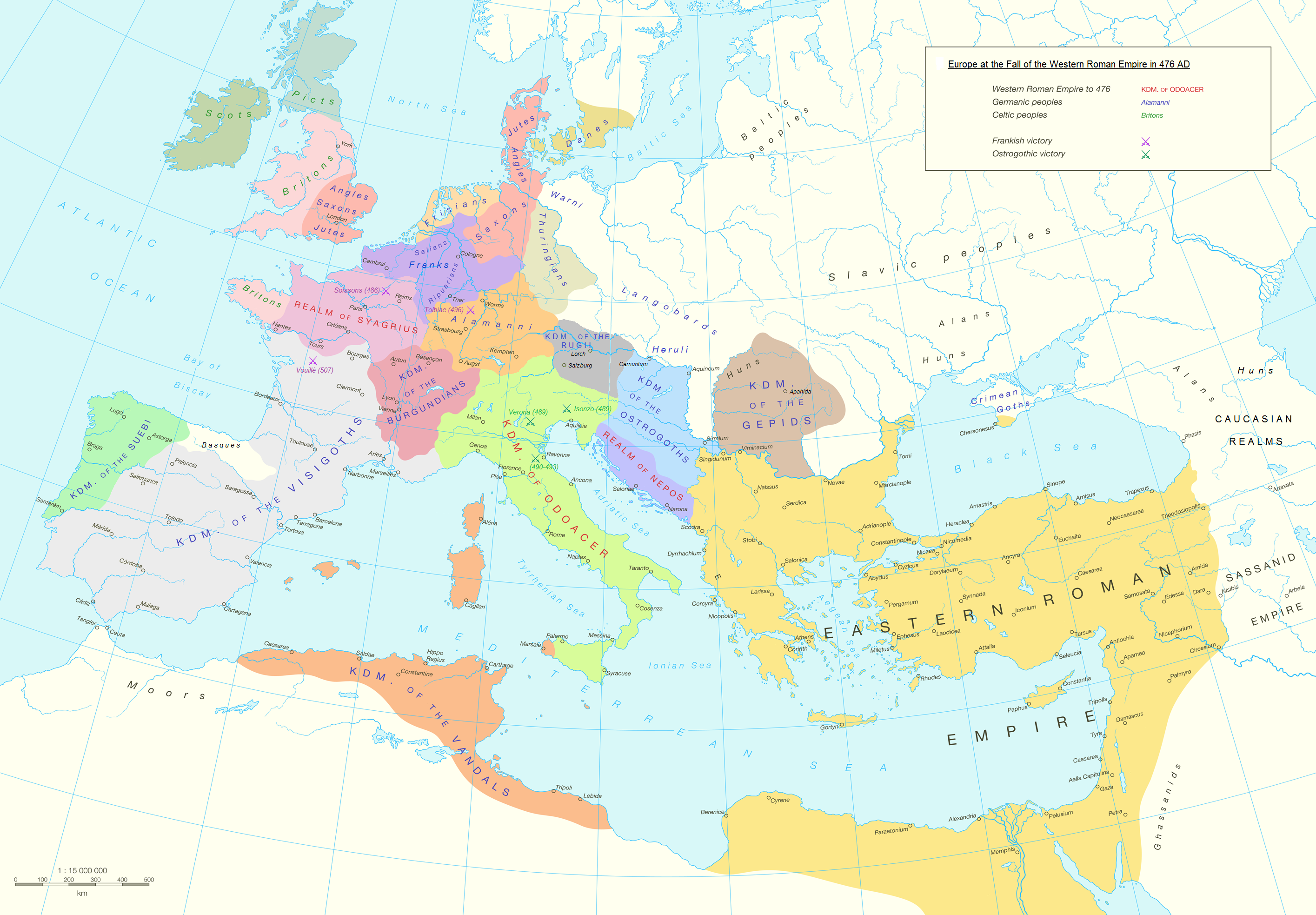
A map of Europe in A.D. 476, showing the Vandal Kingdom in orange, and the Eastern Roman Empire in yellow

Leo rose to the throne of the Eastern Roman Empire in 457 after the death of Emperor Marcian (r. 450–457). Aspar, the magister militum, selected him for this position, much as he had selected Marcian himself. Despite being half-Alanic and half-Gothic, Aspar held much influence in the empire since the mid-fifth century, and wielded significant power over Marcian and Leo. Basiliscus served as a military officer under Leo, and was made consul of the East for 465, with Flavius Hermenericus as consul of the West. Basiliscus was granted the rank of magister militum per Thracias in c. 464, and held it till 467/468; during this period he won many victories in Thrace against the Huns and Goths. He led troops in a war against a mixed group of the two in 466/467, along with Anagast, Aspar, and Ostrys. He was made a patricius at some point, first mentioned as such in 468.

Around 466, Leo attempted to free himself of Aspar's control. He utilized the support of the Isaurians, marrying the Isaurian chieftain Zeno (r. 474–475, 476–491) to his daughter Ariadne, in exchange for support. This resulted in a significant change to eastern imperial policy, notably ending the policy of ignoring the requests from the West for military aid. After Anthemius (r. 467–472), Marcian's son-in-law, was installed by Leo as Western emperor on 12 April 467, an embassy was sent to the Vandal King Gaiseric, to inform him as well as warn him not to interfere in Italy or the Western Roman throne; Gaiseric accused them of violating a prior treaty, possibly enacted in 433, and prepared for war. Rumors may have spread in Constantinople that the Vandals were preparing an invasion of Alexandria. As a result of this, in 468 Basiliscus was given command of an expedition against the Vandals, and likely promoted to magister militum praesentalis at that time. It is said that the fleet consisted of 1,113 ships, with more than 100,000 men under the command of Basiliscus, (Note: Historian Warren Treadgold argues for a figure of 400,000 total men, as given by Byzantine administrator John the Lydian, arguing that Procopius's figure of 100,000 excludes the sailors and oarsmen.) including mercenaries from as far as Öland, Sweden. According to Bury, Leo was influenced by both Verina and Aspar in his selection of Basiliscus, whom he describes as both "incompetent and untrustworthy"; he further states that Aspar intentionally chose a poor commander, to prevent Leo from becoming stronger by way of weakening the Vandals. Historians Gerard Friell and Stephen Williams dismiss this, but accept that Verina pushed for his appointment and that Aspar did not object. Historian Peter Heather points out that, at this point, Basiliscus had just returned from considerable success on the Balkan frontier of the empire.

Marcellinus, a West Roman commander, was sent to capture Sardinia, and then to sail to link up with the Eastern armies near Carthage, the Vandal capital. Basiliscus was to sail with the bulk of the forces directly to Carthage, and the Eastern comes rei militaris Heraclius of Edessa was to gather up Eastern forces in Egypt, disembark in Tripolitania, and then to approach Carthage by land; this way, the Vandals were forced to fight in three areas. Marcellinus seized Sardinia with little trouble, and Heraclius took the fortress of Tripoli, Libya, and both headed to connect with Basiliscus's forces. Basiliscus's galleys scattered the Vandal fleet near Sicily, something said by Procopius to have caused Gaiseric to give all up for lost, fearing a decisive blow to capture Carthage. However, Basiliscus did not press his advantage and rested his forces in Cape Bon, 60 kilometres (37 mi) from Carthage. This was a strategic location as it was near the port of Utica, which, unlike Carthage, was not blocked off with a chain, and the winds would push opposing ships into the coast. According to historians Michael Kulikowski, Friell, and Williams, Gaiseric feigned interest in peace and proposed a five-day truce, in order to allow himself time to prepare. Basiliscus accepted, possibly in favor of Aspar who opposed the war, in order to achieve a compromise with the Vandals. Heather notes that the Romans strongly intended to avoid a naval engagement, and archaeologist George Bass suggests this might be the reason that Basiliscus hesitated to strike the Vandals.

Gaiseric assembled a new fleet with a number of fire ships and, aided by good winds, attacked the Roman fleet at the Battle of Cape Bon. The Roman fleet was routed by the combination of the fire ships, bad winds, and surprise, with half of it being destroyed. Basiliscus fled with the remainder of the fleet to Sicily, to consolidate with Marcellinus's forces; their morale and supply might have brought a victory, but Marcellinus was assassinated, possibly on Ricimer's orders. Heraclius, who had not yet reached Carthage, returned to the Eastern Roman Empire by the path he came, and Basiliscus returned to Constantinople. The total cost of the armaments for the fleet was 130,000 pounds (59,000 kg) of gold, (Note: Procopius gives this figure of 130,000 pounds (59,000 kg) of gold, whereas John the Lydian gives a figure of 65,000 pounds (29,000 kg) of gold and 700,000 pounds (320,000 kg) of silver, which, using the 1:18 ratio of gold to silver, would equal roughly 104,000 pounds (47,000 kg); John seems to derive this from Candidus, who states that the treasuries of the Praetorian Prefects, both east and west, contributed 47,000 pounds (21,000 kg) of gold, the coffers of the Sacred Largess 17,000 pounds (7,700 kg) of gold, 700,000 of silver partially from the Private Estates, largely made up of confiscated property, and partly from the reserves of Anthemius.) more than the entire treasury of the Eastern Empire, causing the Eastern Empire to waver above bankruptcy for more than 30 years.

Upon his return to Constantinople, Basiliscus sought refuge in the Church of St. Sophia, before Verina interceded on his behalf to have him pardoned by Leo. He may have remained magister militum praesentalis after this, but largely lived a life of retirement at Heraclea on the Propontis. Aspar was suspected of inducing Basiliscus to betray the expedition, sympathizing with the Vandals, and promising to make him emperor in place of Leo. Friell and Williams also reject this, commenting that the need to find a scapegoat is common in such disasters and that the accusation is implausible. One source, Hydatius, states that Aspar was stripped of his rank for voicing his suspicions, but historians A. H. M. Jones, John Robert Martindale, and John Morris state that this is almost certainly a confusion relating to the disgrace of Ardabur, his son, who had informed the Sassanid Empire of Roman military weakness.

Aspar regained power after the failure of the African invasion, and his son Patricius became the presumptive heir to the throne by marrying Leo's daughter Leontia Porphyrogenita in 470. Historian L. M. Whitby suggests this may have been a ploy to lull Aspar into a sense of security. When anti-German sentiment rose up, Leo first quarreled with Aspar and then had him assassinated over suspicions of conspiracy. Basiliscus supported Leo in his power struggle against Aspar, and subsequently Theodoric Strabo, in 471/472. Aspar and Ardabur were killed in 471, and Patricius, severely wounded, was stripped of his position as caesar and divorced from Leontia. After this, Zeno gained more power over the court. Theodoric Strabo attempted to avenge Aspar and marched against Constantinople, but was pushed back by Basiliscus and Zeno. A little later, he sent a series of demands to Leo in the capital and attacked Arcadiopolis and Philipopolis, but was forced to negotiate soon after due to the lack of supplies.

=== Rise to power ===
When Leo fell ill in 473, he had his grandson, Leo II (r. 474), the son of Zeno and Ariadne, crowned as emperor in October 473. Leo died on 18 January 474, and Leo II took the throne. Zeno was installed as co-emperor, crowned on 29 January, and when Leo II died in Autumn, Zeno became the sole eastern emperor. Zeno likely had Theoderic Strabo stripped of his role as magister militum praesentalis. Zeno was very unpopular, among both the common people and the senatorial class, in part simply because he was an Isaurian, a race which had acquired a poor reputation under Emperor Arcadius (r. 383–408), and also because his rule would induce a promotion of fellow Isaurians to high positions.

Although Verina had supported Zeno's elevation as co-emperor to Leo II, she turned against him once he became sole emperor. The causes for this are disputed. The Byzantists Bury and Ernst Stein suggest this was motivated by personal hatred, and Ernest Walter Brooks, historian and scholar of the Syriac language, suggests the Isaurian background of Zeno directly caused the hatred of Verina and the people. Historians Kamilla Twardowska and W. D. Burgess argue that his ethnicity likely exacerbated existing hatred, but did not solely cause it. Twardowska also dismisses Evagrius Scholasticus's suggestions, especially that of him leading a "dissolute life", stating that is common of historians wishing to paint an emperor in a bad light. Historian Mirosław Leszka attributes the action to a simple desire for power, and Twardowska theorizes that Verina supported him while Leo II was emperor because she would still retain influence as a close relative, which she would not wield over Zeno himself. Zeno had the option of raising another son from a previous marriage to the throne, or else his brother, Longinus, which would remove any remnant of Verina's influence. Byzantine chronicler John Malalas states that Verina put forth a request which Zeno denied, causing her conspiracy, but does not specify the request; historian Maciej Salamon has argued that this request would be to have Basiliscus and her other relatives placed in high positions.

Verina conspired with others to remove him as emperor, and historians generally accept that she planned to install her lover, the magister officiorum Patricius, as emperor and to marry him. (Note: This narrative is challenged by Kamilla Twardowska, who views it more likely that this is propaganda from Candidus, repeated by John of Antioch. Instead, she argues that Patricius was likely a key political ally of Verina, but, given the revolt was likely influenced by desire to retain dynastic power, not a plausible candidate for the throne.) She was supported in this plot by Theoderic Strabo, angered by Zeno's coronation, and Basiliscus, who succeeded in recruiting Illus and Trocundes, Isaurian brothers, as well as her nephew Armatus. The plot had the backing of the military, bolstered by Basiliscus's popularity, and that of Illus and Trocundes, and also the support of the Eastern Roman Senate. The position of the Patriarch of Constantinople, Acacius, is unclear, although Twardowska considers it likely that he would have withheld support from either side until the outcome was clear. The exact date the conspiracy began is unknown: Salamon argues it began around 473, whereas Twardowska argues it began only after Zeno took sole power. The conspiracy was successful, as Zeno fled to his native Isauria on 9 January 475, either after learning of the conspiracy or after being convinced by Verina that his life was in danger, taking with him a number of companions and funds. Many remaining Isuarians were massacred in Constantinople when news of his flight spread. Basiliscus convinced the senate to acclaim him emperor, instead of Patricius, and Basiliscus was crowned at the Hebdomon palace. He immediately had his son, Marcus, crowned as Caesar, and later co-emperor, while his wife was crowned Augusta and Patricius was executed. Zeno took residence in the fortress of Olba, and later Sbida. Illus and Trocundes were sent by Basiliscus to lay siege to Zeno's fortress, and capturing Longinus, whom Illus would not release until 485.

== Reign ==
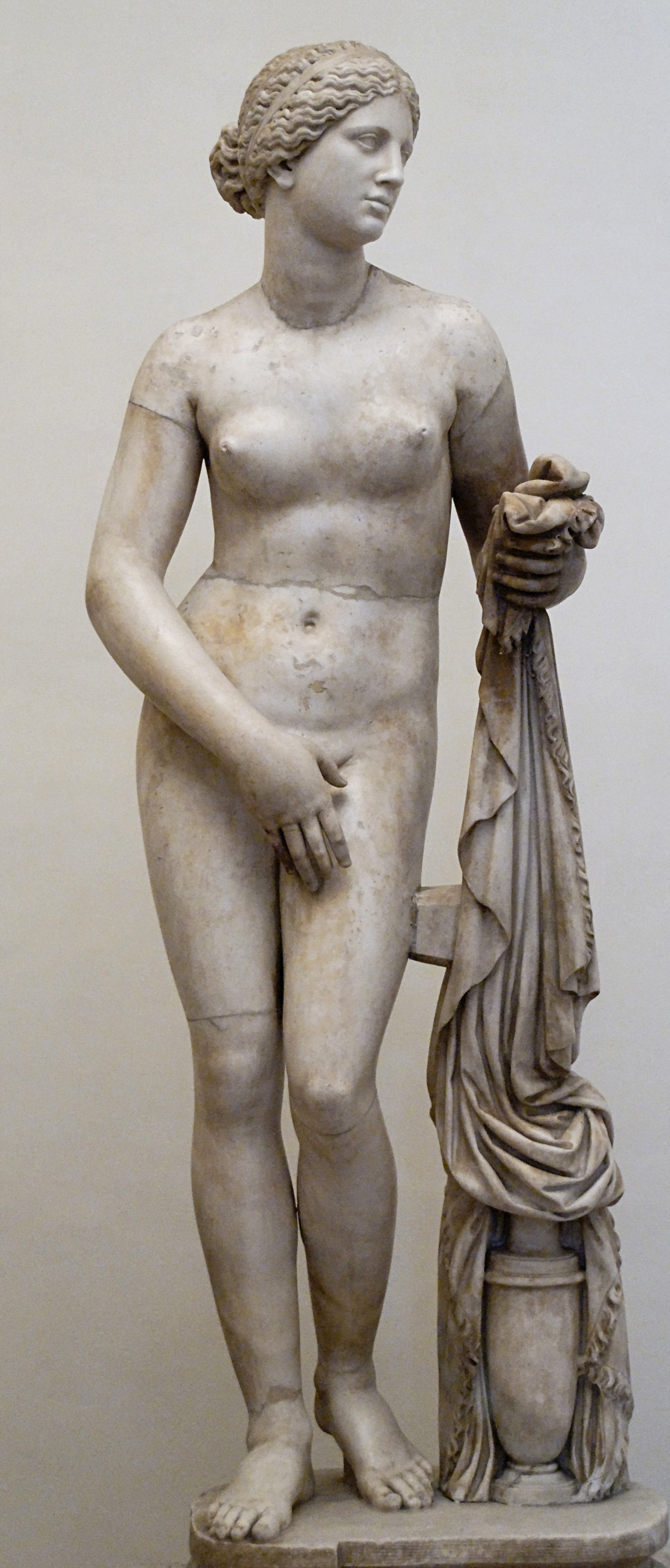
A copy of the Aphrodite of Knidos, whose original was destroyed in the fire of 475/476

Basiliscus quickly lost support in Constantinople, through a combination of heavy taxes and heretical ecclesiastical policies, as well as a natural disaster. A large fire broke out in the quarter of Chalkoprateia in 475/476, before quickly spreading. The fire destroyed the Basilica, a library containing 120,000 books, as well as the Palace of Lausus, the Aphrodite of Knidos, the Lindian Athene, and the Samian Here. Bury remarks that, as is common with "accidents in superstitious ages", the fire was reputed to be supernatural in origin. Many at the time viewed it as a symbol of divine wrath against Basiliscus.

While Basiliscus's rise was not illegal, as usurpations confirmed by the senate were generally considered legitimate, such had not happened for over a century in the Eastern Roman Empire. Additionally, he was politically incompetent and temperamental, alienating much of his support. While Basiliscus was supported initially by the elites of the Eastern Roman Empire, he never gained much popularity amongst the common people, weakening his legitimacy; his conflicts with Acacius reduced his support from the people of Constantinople, who were heavily Chalcedonian. The near-bankruptcy of the empire forced Basiliscus to levy extensive taxes and to sell off public positions for money. He utilized the praefectus urbi Epinicus, a former ally of Verina, to extort money from the church. Verina turned against Basiliscus after the execution of her lover and began to plot to return Zeno to power, and sought refuge in Blachernae. It is not known if she fled because of her support or began to support Zeno after she fled, as the source, Candidus, is unclear, but the Vita Danielis Stylite states that she remained there until after Basiliscus died.

Basiliscus had Armatus made magister militum praesentalis, allegedly at the insistence of Zenonis. This turned Theoderic Strabo against him, as he hated Armatus. Armatus was also made consul in 476, alongside Basiliscus himself. Illus and Trocundes, laying siege to Zeno in his native lands, defected to him. This has usually been ascribed to a failure to fulfill unspecified promises made to them, as given by Theophanes the Confessor, which many historians identify as a promise to make them both magister militum, but Leszka challenges this, arguing that Theophanes does not specify the promises because he invented them as the most likely explanation. Leszka questions that Basiliscus would entrust military command to men he had lied to, and argues that they were motivated instead by fear that Basiliscus would be overthrown, or else religious opposition. From February/March 476, Basiliscus remained in the Hebdomon, out of fear of the capital's populace; this news may have motivated them, along with letters received from ministers of the capital. These letters informed them that the city was now ready to restore Zeno, as the people had become even less supportive of Basiliscus due to the "fiscal rapacity of his ministers", as Bury puts it. Illus, possibly buoyed by his hold over Zeno, by way of his imprisonment of his brother, arranged to ally him and they began to march towards Constantinople with their combined forces.

Basiliscus ordered Armatus to take command of all the troops in Thrace and Constantinople, as well as the palace guard, and lead them against the three. In spite of his oath of loyalty, Armatus betrayed Basiliscus when Zeno offered to have him made magister militum praesentalis for life, and his son, Basiliscus, crowned as caesar. He allowed Zeno to pass to Constantinople unhindered, deliberately traveling on a different road than the one used by Zeno's army, and marched instead into Isaura. Zeno entered Constantinople unopposed in August 476. Basiliscus and his family fled and took refuge in a church, only leaving once Zeno promised not to execute them. Zeno exiled them to Limnae in Cappadocia, (Note: Victor of Tunnuna gives the location as Sasima, and Evagrius Scholasticus and J. B. Bury give the location as Cucusus.) where they were imprisoned in a dried-up cistern, and left to starve to death. According to some sources, they were instead beheaded.

=== Religious policies ===
During the 5th century, a central religious issue was the debate concerning how the human and divine nature of Jesus Christ were associated, following the Arian controversy. The School of Alexandria, including theologians such as Athanasius, asserted the equality of Christ and God, and therefore focused upon the divinity of Christ. The School of Antioch, including theologians such as Theodore of Mopsuestia, determined not to lose the human aspect of Christ, focused upon his humanity. Shortly before Marcian had become emperor, the Second Council of Ephesus was held in 449. The council stated that Jesus had one divine united nature, called miaphysis; this was rejected by the Pope and the Patriarch of Constantinople because of disputes on the matter of Christology, as the Pope and Patriarch of Constantinople saw the belief in miaphysis as heretical. Marcian convened the Council of Chalcedon in October 451, attended by about 500 bishops, most of them Eastern Roman. This council condemned the Second Council of Ephesus and agreed that Jesus had a divine nature (physis) and a human nature, united in one person (hypostasis), "without confusion, change, division, or separation." The council also repeated the importance of the See of Constantinople in Canon 28, placing it firmly in second place behind the See of Rome, and giving it the right to appoint bishops in the Eastern Roman Empire, placing it over the Sees of Alexandria, Jerusalem, and Antioch.

Basiliscus rose to power during a time when the miaphysite faction was growing in power, and his attempts to ally them to himself backfired severely. Historian Jason Osequeda posits that Basiliscus's mistake was "appearing as the member of one sphere attempting to intrude into the other, rather than using influence and negotiation to achieve his platform", and that he was unaware of his outsider status, causing him to be viewed as "attempting to usurp not only an earthly crown but a spiritual one too." Some historians view it likely that Zenonis influenced Basiliscus towards miaphysitism. Basiliscus had Theoctistus, a miaphysite, made magister officiorum, and he received the miaphysite patriarch Timothy Ailuros, who returned from his exile in Crimea after the death of Leo. By them Basiliscus was persuaded to attack the tenets of Chalcedonianism. Basiliscus had Timothy Ailuros restored as the Patriarch of Alexandria, and Peter the Fuller as Patriarch of Antioch. Under his reign the Third Council of Ephesus was held in 475, presided over by Timothy Ailuros, which officially condemned the Council of Chalcedon, and a synodical letter was sent to Basiliscus requesting that Patriarch Acacius be stripped of his role. Historian Richard Price argues that Basiliscus's association with Timothy Ailuros also reduced his support as some rumors suggested that Timothy had a role in the murder of Proterius of Alexandria, a Chalcedonian, and his ties to Timothy were seen as tacit approval of this murder.

Basiliscus issued an encyclical on 9 April 475, (Note: Otto Seeck gives the date as Easter (6 April).) which promoted the first three ecumenical councils of the church: Nicaea, Constantinople, and Ephesus, and condemned the Council of Chalcedon and the Tome of Leo. While enthusiastically received in Ephesus and Egypt, it resulted in outrage from the monasteries as well as alienating Patriarch Acacius, and the heavily Chalcedonian population of the capital. Repudiating the Council of Chalcedon invalidated Canon 28 of it, ending Acacius's control over the Eastern sees, and as such Acacius refused to sign it. Acacius draped the Church of St. Sophia in black, (Note: Some sources say all the churches of Constantinople were draped in black, rather than just the Church of St. Sophia.) and lead a congregation in mourning. This caused Basiliscus to leave the city, and a significant portion of the city to support Zeno's return. The popular stylite (pillar monk) Daniel the Stylite, whom Basiliscus had been attempting to sway to his side, rejected his efforts after the publication of the encyclical, and descended from his pillar to pray alongside Acacius, branding Basiliscus as a "second Diocletian" for his attacks on the church.

There is some debate over the differences between the encyclical presented by Evagrius Scholasticus and that of Pseudo-Zacharias Rhetor. Notably, Evagrius's version does not contain some of the references to the Council of Nicaea and the Second Council of Ephesus, making it less extreme. Philippe Blaudeau suggests that the one presented by Evagrius was a modified version presented to Acacius, as it would be more palatable to him; as well as that the language of the original would have made Eutychians believe that Timothy and Basiliscus agreed with them, and the subsequent document clarified their positions. The current consensus among historians is that Evagrius's version was the original, made more extreme after the Third Council of Ephesus. Some arguments have been made by Eduard Schwartz, Hanns Brennecke, and René Draguet that Basiliscus approved Evagrius's text, but that the more extreme version was written by Paul the Sophist. Whatever the case, Basiliscus soon voided his encyclical, issuing a new letter dubbed the "anti-encyclical", (Note: Some sources put this concurrent to Zeno's march to Constantinople, stating that the events took place after Basiliscus was made aware of the defection of Armatus, causing him to quickly revoke his ecclesiastical edicts, and attempt to placate Patriarch Acacius and the people.) revoking his previous encyclical, reaffirming condemnation of heresy, and restoring the rights of Canon 28 to Acacius, but did not explicitly mention the Council of Chalcedon. Notably, the first encyclical also asserted the right for an emperor to dictate and judge theological doctrine, subsuming the function of an Ecumenical Council, and is worded much like an imperial edict. Although Acacius and Basiliscus had feuded since the first months of his reign, Daniel later played the part of a diplomat, reconciling them near the end of the latter's reign, before Zeno retook Constantinople. All of Basiliscus's religious edicts were annulled by the praetorian prefect Sebastianos in December 477, by order of Zeno.

== In popular culture ==
Basiliscus is part of a 1669 play written by Sir William Killigrew, The Imperial Tragedy, where he appears as a ghost, during the second reign of Zeno.

== Bibliography ==
=== Primary sources ===
- The Anonymus Valesianus
- Candidus Isaurus
- The Chronicon Paschale
- Evagrius Scholasticus, Historia Ecclesiastica III.iv
- The Fasti
- George Kedrenos
- Hydatius
- Joannes Zonaras
- John of Nikiû
- John Malalas
- Jordanes
- Malchus
- Marcellinus Comes
- Michael the Syrian
- Nikephoros Kallistos Xanthopoulos
- Pamprepius
- Patria of Constantinople
- Photios
- Priscus
- Procopius
- The Suda
- Theodorus Lector
- Theophanes the Confessor
- Victor of Tunnuna
- The Vita Danielis Stylite
- The Vita Petri Iberi
- Zacharias Scholasticus
- The Zuqnin Chronicle

=== Secondary sources ===
- Bass, George F. (1972). A History of Seafaring Based on Underwater Archaeology. New York: Walker and Co. ISBN 0-8027-0390-9.
- Blaudeau, Philippe (2006). Alexandrie et Constantinople (451–491): de l'histoire à la géo-ecclésiologie (in French). Rome: École française de Rome Press. doi:10.1515/BYZS.2009.010a. ISBN 978-2-7283-0755-5. S2CID 191591054.
- Bonner, Michael (2020). "Humiliation and Heresy". The Last Empire of Iran. Piscataway, NJ: Gorgias Press. pp. 123–170. doi:10.31826/9781463240516-007. ISBN 978-1-4632-4051-6. S2CID 243432942.
- Brandes, Wolfram (1993). "Familienbande? Odoaker, Basiliskos und Harmatios". Klio (in German). 75 (75). doi:10.1524/klio.1993.75.75.407. S2CID 194462873.
- Brennecke, Hanns Christof (1988). Studien zur Geschichte der Homöer : der Osten bis zum Ende der homöischen Reichskirche (in German). Tübingen: Mohr Siebeck. ISBN 978-3-16-145246-8.
- Brooks, Ernest Walter (1893). "The Emperor Zenon and the Isaurians". The English Historical Review. 8 (30): 209–238. JSTOR 548042.
- Burgess, William Douglas (1992). "Isaurian Factions in the Reign of Zeno the Isaurian". Latomus. 51 (4): 874–880. JSTOR 41536458.
- Bury, J.B. (1923). Bill Thayer (ed.). History of the Later Roman Empire from the Death of Theodosius I to the Death of Justinian. New York: Dover Publications. ISBN 978-0-486-14338-5.
- Croke, Brian (2004). "The Imperial Reigns of Leo II". Byzantinische Zeitschrift. 96 (2): 559–575. doi:10.1515/BYZS.2003.559. S2CID 191460505.
- Davis, Stephen J. (2004). The Early Coptic Papacy: The Egyptian Church and Its Leadership in Late Antiquity. Cairo: American University in Cairo Press. ISBN 978-977-424-830-6.
- Draguet, René (1924). Julien d'Halicarnasse et sa controverse avec Sévère d'Antioche sur l'incorruptibilité de corps du Christ (in French). Louvain: P. Smeesters. OCLC 496040364.
- Elton, Hugh (1998). "Flavius Basiliscus (AD 475–476)". De Imperatoribus Romanis. Archived from the original on 8 July 2021.
- Frend, W. H. C. (1988). Archaeology and History in the Study of Early Christianity. Variorum Reprints. ISBN 978-0-86078-230-8.
- Friell, Gerard; Williams, Stephen (2005). The Rome that Did Not Fall: The Survival of the East in the Fifth Century. London: Routledge. ISBN 978-1-134-73545-7.
- Gallagher, Clarence (2008). "The Two Churches". The Oxford Handbook of Byzantine Studies. By Jeffreys, Elizabeth; Haldon, John; Cormack, Robin. Oxford: Oxford University Press. ISBN 978-0-19-925246-6.
- Greatrex, Geoffrey (2011). The Chronicle of Pseudo-Zachariah Rhetor: Church and War in Late Antiquity. Liverpool: Liverpool University Press. ISBN 978-1-84631-494-0.
- Handley, Mark A. (2010). "Two Hundred and Seventy-Four Addenda and Corrigenda to the Prosopography of the Later Roman Empire from the Latin-Speaking Balkans". Journal of Late Antiquity. 3 (1). ISSN 1939-6716. ProQuest 365723841.
- Heather, Peter J. (2007). The Fall of the Roman Empire: A New History of Rome and the Barbarians. Oxford: Oxford University Press. ISBN 978-0-19-532541-6.
- Herrin, Judith (2016). "Late Antique Origins of the 'Imperial Feminine'". Byzantinoslavica - Revue internationale des Études Byzantines. 74 (1–2). ISSN 0007-7712.
- Kazhdan, Alexander P. (1991). The Oxford Dictionary of Byzantium. Oxford: Oxford University Press. ISBN 978-0-19-504652-6.
- Killigrew, William (1669). The Imperial Tragedy. BiblioBazaar. ISBN 978-1-240-94033-2.
- Kosiński, Rafał (2010). "Acacius, Bishop of Constantinople in the years AD 472–489". U schyłku starożytności – Studia źródłoznawcze (in Polish). 9. ISSN 2080-8097.
- Krautschick, Stefan (1986). "Zwei Aspekte des Jahres 476". Historia: Zeitschrift für Alte Geschichte (in German). 35 (3): 344–371. JSTOR 4435971.
- Kulikowski, Michael (2019). The Tragedy of Empire: From Constantine to the Destruction of Roman Italy. Cambridge, MA: Harvard University Press. doi:10.4159/9780674242708. ISBN 978-0-674-24270-8. S2CID 213445912.
- Jones, A. H. M.; Martindale, J. R.; Morris, J. (1980). The Prosopography of the Later Roman Empire: Volume 2, AD 395–527. Cambridge: Cambridge University Press. ISBN 978-0-521-20159-9.
- Jones, A. H. M. (1966). Decline of the Ancient World. Los Angeles: University of California Press. ISBN 978-0-582-48211-1.
- Lee, A. D. (2013). From Rome to Byzantium AD 363 to 565: The Transformation of Ancient Rome. Edinburgh: Edinburgh University Press. ISBN 978-0-7486-6835-9. JSTOR 10.3366/j.ctt1g0b1z1.
- Lee, A. D. (2001). "The Eastern Empire: Theodosius to Anastasius". The Cambridge Ancient History, Volume 14. By Cameron, Averil; Ward-Perkins, Bryan; Whitby, Michael. Cambridge: Cambridge University Press. ISBN 978-0-521-32591-2.
- Leszka, Mirosław Jerzy (2013). "The Career of Flavius Appalius Illus Trocundes". Byzantinoslavica: Revue internationale des Études Byzantines. 71 (1–2). ISSN 0007-7712.
- MacGeorge, Penny (2002). Late Roman Warlords. Oxford: Oxford University Press. ISBN 978-0-19-153091-3.
- Nathan, Geoffrey S. (1998). "Roman Emperors – DIR Marcian". www.roman-emperors.org. Archived from the original on 6 July 2018.
- Ostrogorsky, George (1956). History of The Byzantine State. New Brunswick, Canada: Rutgers University Press. ISBN 978-0-8135-1198-6. OCLC 422217218.
- Osequeda, Jason (2018). Because it is New Rome: The Authority of the Patriarchate of Constantinople, 379–553 (Thesis). Chicago: University of Chicago. doi:10.6082/M15H7DF0.
- Perale, Marco (2020). "45. P.Vindob. G 29788 A-C". Adespota Papyracea Hexametra Graeca (APHex I). Vol. 1. pp. 422–462. doi:10.1515/9783110295085-051. ISBN 978-3-11-029508-5. S2CID 241314930.
- Pingree, David (1976). "Political Horoscopes from the Reign of Zeno". Dumbarton Oaks Papers. 30: 133–150. doi:10.2307/1291392. JSTOR 1291392.
- Redies, Michael (1997). "Die Usurpation des Basiliskos (475–476) im Kontext der aufsteigenden monophysitischen Kirche". Revue Internationale d'Histoire et d'Archéologie (IVe-VIIe siècle) (in German). 5: 211–221. doi:10.1484/J.AT.2.300972.
- Rösch, Gerhard (1978). Onoma Basileias: Studien zum offiziellen Gebrauch der Kaisertitel in spätantiker und frühbyzantinischer Zeit. Byzantina et Neograeca Vindobonensia (in German). Verlag der österreichischen Akademie der Wissenschaften. ISBN 978-3-7001-0260-1.
- Salamon, Maciej (1994). "Basiliscus cum Romanis suis". Studia Moesiaca. OCLC 38043191.
- Schwartz, Eduard (1934). Publizistische Sammlungen zum acacianischen Schisma (in German). Munich: Bayerische Akademie der Wissenschaften. OCLC 470361697.
- Seeck, Otto (1919). Regesten der Kaiser und Päpste für die Jahre 311 bis 476 n. Chr. Vorarbeit zu einer Prosopographie der christlichen Kaiserzeit, von Otto Seeck (in German). Minerva. OCLC 504590132.
- Stearn, Rod (2020). "Contextualizing Defeat". Historiography and Hierotopy. Piscataway, NJ: Gorgias Press. doi:10.31826/9781463239824-008. ISBN 978-1-4632-3982-4. S2CID 243239520.
- Stein, Ernst (1959). Histoire du Bas-Empire: Volume 1. Paris: Desclée de Brouwer. OCLC 6752757.
- Stewart, Michael (2020). "Courage, Fear, and Generalship in the Vandal War". Masculinity, Identity, and Power Politics in the Age of Justinian. Amsterdam: Amsterdam University Press. pp. 99–124. doi:10.1515/9789048540259-008. ISBN 978-90-485-4025-9. S2CID 241107373.
- Treadgold, Warren T. (1995). Byzantium and Its Army, 284–1081. Stanford, California: Stanford University Press. ISBN 978-0-8047-3163-8.
- Twardowska, Kamilla (2014). "Empress Verina and the Events of 475–476". Byzantinoslavica - Revue internationale des Études Byzantines. 72 (1–2). ISSN 0007-7712.
- Vasiliev, A. A. (1980) [1958]. History of the Byzantine Empire, 324–1453. Volume I. Madison: University of Wisconsin Press. ISBN 978-0-299-80925-6.
- Whitby, L. M. (2015). "Aspar, Flavius Ardaburius". Oxford Classical Dictionary. doi:10.1093/acrefore/9780199381135.013.6994. ISBN 978-0-19-938113-5.
- Whitworth, Patrick (2017). Constantinople to Chalcedon: Shaping the World to Come. Sacristy Press. ISBN 978-1-910519-47-9.

Basiliscus Leonid Dynasty Born: unknown Died: 476/477
Regnal titles
Preceded by Zeno	Eastern Roman Emperor; 475–476 with Marcus	Succeeded by Zeno
Political offices
Preceded by Rusticius, Anicius Olybrius	Roman consul 465 with Hermenericus	Succeeded by Leo Augustus III; Tatianus
Preceded by Zeno Augustus II (in the East alone)	Roman consul 476 with Armatus	Vacant Title next held by Illus, in 478
