= Marcus (son of Basiliscus) =

Eastern Roman emperor from 475 to 476

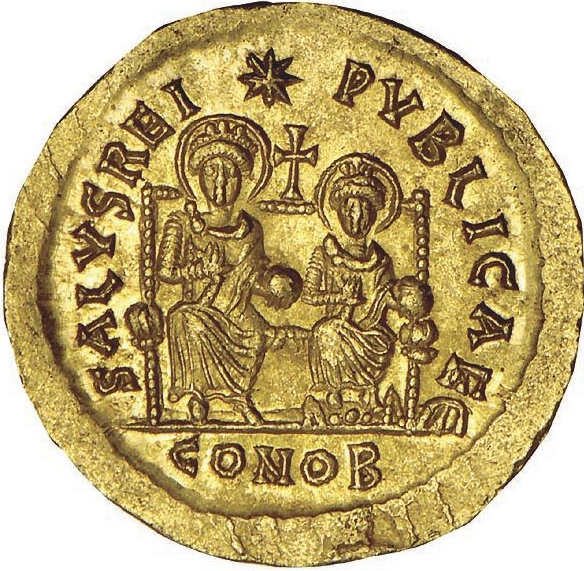
- Solidus of Marcus with his father Basiliscus

Roman emperor of the East
- Reign: 475 – August 476
- Predecessor: Zeno, deposed
- Successor: Zeno, restored
- Western emperors: Julius Nepos (475); Romulus (475–476)
- Died: August 476; Cappadocia
- House: House of Leo
- Father: Basiliscus
- Mother: Zenonis

Marcus (Latin: Marcus; Greek: Μᾶρκος; died August 476) was the son of the Eastern Roman general and usurper Basiliscus and Zenonis. He was acclaimed caesar in 475 and later promoted to augustus, ruling as junior co-emperor to his father. When Zeno reoccupied Constantinople in late August 476, Marcus, with his parents, hid in a church. Zeno swore he would not spill their blood, and instead had them exiled to Limnae in Cappadocia, where they were then starved to death.

== History ==
=== Rise to power ===
Marcus was the son of Basiliscus and Zenonis. When Byzantine Emperor Leo (r. 457–474) fell ill in 473, he had his grandson, Leo II (r. 474), the son of Zeno (r. 474–475, 476–491) and Ariadne, crowned as emperor in October 473. Leo died on 18 January 474, and Leo II took the throne. Zeno was installed as co-emperor, crowned on 29 January, and when Leo II died in Autumn, Zeno became the sole eastern emperor. Zeno was very unpopular, among both the common people and the senatorial class, in part simply because he was an Isaurian, a race that had acquired a poor reputation under Emperor Arcadius (r. 383–408), and also because his rule would induce a promotion of fellow Isuarians to high positions. Although Verina had supported Zeno's elevation as co-emperor to Leo II, she turned against him once he became sole emperor. Verina conspired with others to remove him as emperor, and historians generally accept that she planned to install her lover, the magister officiorum Patricius, as emperor and to marry him. (Note: This narrative is challenged by Kamilla Twardowska, who views it more likely that this is propaganda from Candidus, repeated by John of Antioch. Instead, she argues that Patricius was likely a key political ally of Verina, but, given the revolt was likely influenced by the desire to retain dynastic power, not a plausible candidate for the throne.) She was supported in this plot by the general Theoderic Strabo, angered by Zeno's coronation, and Marcus' father Basiliscus, who succeeded in recruiting Illus and Trocundes, Isaurian brothers, as well as her nephew Armatus. The plot had the backing of the military, bolstered by Basiliscus' popularity, and that of Illus and Trocundes, and also the support of the Eastern Roman Senate. The position of the Patriarch of Constantinople, Acacius, is unclear, although the historian Kamilla Twardowska considers it likely that he would have withheld support from either side until the outcome was clear. The exact date the conspiracy began is unknown: historian Maciej Salamon argues it began around 473, whereas Twardowska argues it began only after Zeno took sole power. The conspiracy was successful, as Zeno fled to his native Isauria on 9 January 475, either after learning of the conspiracy or after being convinced by Verina that his life was in danger. Basiliscus convinced the senate to acclaim him emperor, instead of Patricius, and Basiliscus was crowned at the Hebdomon palace. Basiliscus immediately had Marcus crowned as caesar, and later raised him to co-emperor.

=== Reign with Basiliscus ===
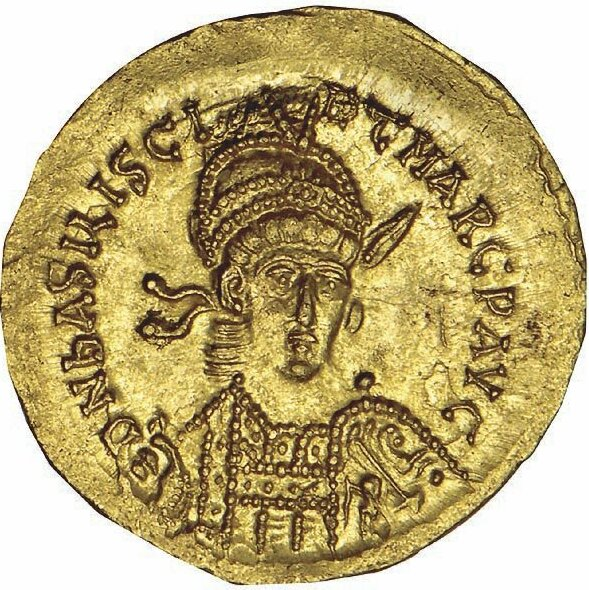
Solidus of Basiliscus with the legend dn basilisci et marc p avg

Basiliscus quickly lost support in Constantinople, through a combination of heavy taxes and heretical ecclesiastical policies, as well as a natural disaster. A large fire broke out in the quarter of Chalkoprateia in 475/476, before quickly spreading. Illus and Trocundes, laying siege to Zeno in his native lands, defected to him. The Byzantine historian Theophanes the Confessor attributed Ilus and Trocundes' betrayal to Zeno's breaking of his promises to them — while Theophanes does not explicitly detail what was promised, many historians consider that Zeno had promised both of them the office of magister militum. However, the historian Mirosław Leszka challenges this, arguing that the most likely reason why Theophanes does not specify the promises is that he invented them. Leszka doubts that Basiliscus would entrust military command to men he had lied to, and argues that they were motivated instead by fear that Basiliscus would be overthrown, or else religious opposition to him. From February/March 476, Basiliscus remained in the Hebdomon, out of fear of the capital's populace; this news may also have motivated Ilus and Trocundes, who had also received letters from ministers in the capital. These letters informed them that the city was now ready to restore Zeno, as the people had become even less supportive of Basiliscus due to the "fiscal rapacity of his ministers", as Bury puts it. Illus had recently taken captive Longinus, Zeno's brother, and may have calculated that this gave him leverage over the deposed emperor: he arranged to ally with Zeno, and they began to march towards Constantinople with their combined forces.

Basiliscus ordered Armatus to take command of all the troops in Thrace and Constantinople, as well as the palace guard, and lead them against the three. In spite of his oath of loyalty, Armatus betrayed Basiliscus when Zeno offered to have him made magister militum praesentalis for life, and his son, Basiliscus, crowned as caesar. He allowed Zeno to pass to Constantinople unhindered, and Zeno entered Constantinople unopposed in August 476. Basiliscus, Marcus, and his family fled and hid in a church, only leaving once Zeno swore he would not execute them. Zeno had them exiled to Limnae in Cappadocia, (Note: Victor of Tunnuna gives the location as Sasima, and Evagrius Scholasticus and J. B. Bury give the location as Cucusus.) where they were imprisoned in a dried-up cistern, and left to starve to death. According to some sources, they were instead beheaded.

== Coinage ==
The coinage of Basiliscus and Marcus was unusual in that it associated the two emperors together on the coin, rather than separate coins being minted in Marcus' name.

== Sources ==
=== Bibliography ===
- Burgess, William Douglas (1992). "Isaurian Factions in the Reign of Zeno the Isaurian". Latomus. 51 (4): 874–880. JSTOR 41536458.
- Bury, J.B. (2012) [1st pub. 1923]. Bill Thayer (ed.). History of the Later Roman Empire from the Death of Theodosius I to the Death of Justinian. New York: Dover Publications. ISBN 978-0-4861-4338-5.
- Croke, Brian (2004). "The Imperial Reigns of Leo II". Byzantinische Zeitschrift. 96 (2): 559–575. doi:10.1515/BYZS.2003.559. S2CID 191460505.
- Elton, Hugh (1998). "Flavius Basiliscus (AD 475–476)". De Imperatoribus Romanis. Archived from the original on 8 July 2021.
- Friell, Gerard; Williams, Stephen (2005). The Rome that Did Not Fall: The Survival of the East in the Fifth Century. London: Routledge. ISBN 978-1-134-73545-7.
- Grierson, Philip (1992). Catalogue of Late Roman Coins in the Dumbarton Oaks Collection and in the Whittemore Collection: From Arcadius and Honorius to the Accession of Anastasius. Washington, D.C.: Dumbarton Oaks Research Library and Collection. ISBN 9780884021933.
- Jones, Arnold Hugh Martin; Martindale, J. R.; Morris, J. (1980). The Prosopography of the Later Roman Empire: Volume 2, AD 395–527. Cambridge: Cambridge University Press. ISBN 978-0-521-20159-9.
- Kosiński, Rafał (2010). "Acacius, Bishop of Constantinople in the years AD 472–489". U schyłku starożytności - Studia źródłoznawcze (in Polish). 9. ISSN 2080-8097.
- Leszka, Mirosław Jerzy (2013). "The Career of Flavius Appalius Illus Trocundes". Byzantinoslavica: Revue internationale des Études Byzantines. 71 (1–2). ISSN 0007-7712.
- Ostrogorsky, George (1969) [1st pub. 1956]. History of The Byzantine State. New Brunswick, Canada: Rutgers University Press. ISBN 9780813511986. OCLC 422217218.
- Redies, Michael (1997). "Die Usurpation des Basiliskos (475-476) im Kontext der aufsteigenden monophysitischen Kirche". Revue Internationale d'Histoire et d'Archéologie (IVe-VIIe siècle) (in German). 5: 211–221. doi:10.1484/J.AT.2.300972.
- Rösch, Gerhard (1978). Onoma Basileias: Studien zum offiziellen Gebrauch der Kaisertitel in spätantiker und frühbyzantinischer Zeit. Byzantina et Neograeca Vindobonensia (in German). Verlag der österreichischen Akademie der Wissenschaften. ISBN 978-3-7001-0260-1.
- Salamon, Maciej (1994). "Basiliscus cum Romanis suis". Studia Moesiaca. OCLC 38043191.
- Stein, Ernst (1959). Histoire du Bas-Empire: Volume 1. Paris, France: Desclée de Brouwer. OCLC 6752757.
- Twardowska, Kamilla (2014). "Empress Verina and the Events of 475-476". Byzantinoslavica - Revue internationale des Études Byzantines. 72 (1–2). ISSN 0007-7712.
