= 476 =

476 in various calendars
- Gregorian calendar: 476; CDLXXVI
- Ab urbe condita: 1229
- Assyrian calendar: 5226
- Balinese saka calendar: 397–398
- Bengali calendar: −118 – −117
- Berber calendar: 1426
- Buddhist calendar: 1020
- Burmese calendar: −162
- Byzantine calendar: 5984–5985
- Chinese calendar: 乙卯年 (Wood Rabbit); 3173 or 2966 — to — 丙辰年 (Fire Dragon); 3174 or 2967
- Coptic calendar: 192–193
- Discordian calendar: 1642
- Ethiopian calendar: 468–469
- Hebrew calendar: 4236–4237
- Hindu calendars
- Vikram Samvat: 532–533
- Shaka Samvat: 397–398
- Kali Yuga: 3576–3577
- Holocene calendar: 10476
- Iranian calendar: 146 BP – 145 BP
- Islamic calendar: 151 BH – 150 BH
- Javanese calendar: 361–362
- Julian calendar: 476; CDLXXVI
- Korean calendar: 2809
- Minguo calendar: 1436 before ROC 民前1436年
- Nanakshahi calendar: −992
- Seleucid era: 787/788 AG
- Thai solar calendar: 1018–1019
- Tibetan calendar: ཤིང་མོ་ཡོས་ལོ་ (female Wood-Hare); 602 or 221 or −551 — to — མེ་ཕོ་འབྲུག་ལོ་ (male Fire-Dragon); 603 or 222 or −550

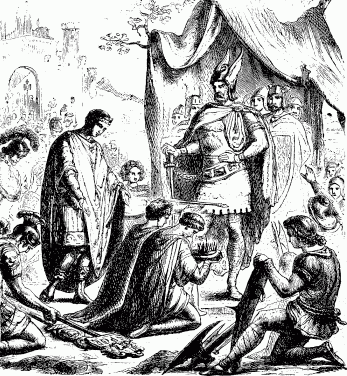
Romulus Augustus resigns the Crown.

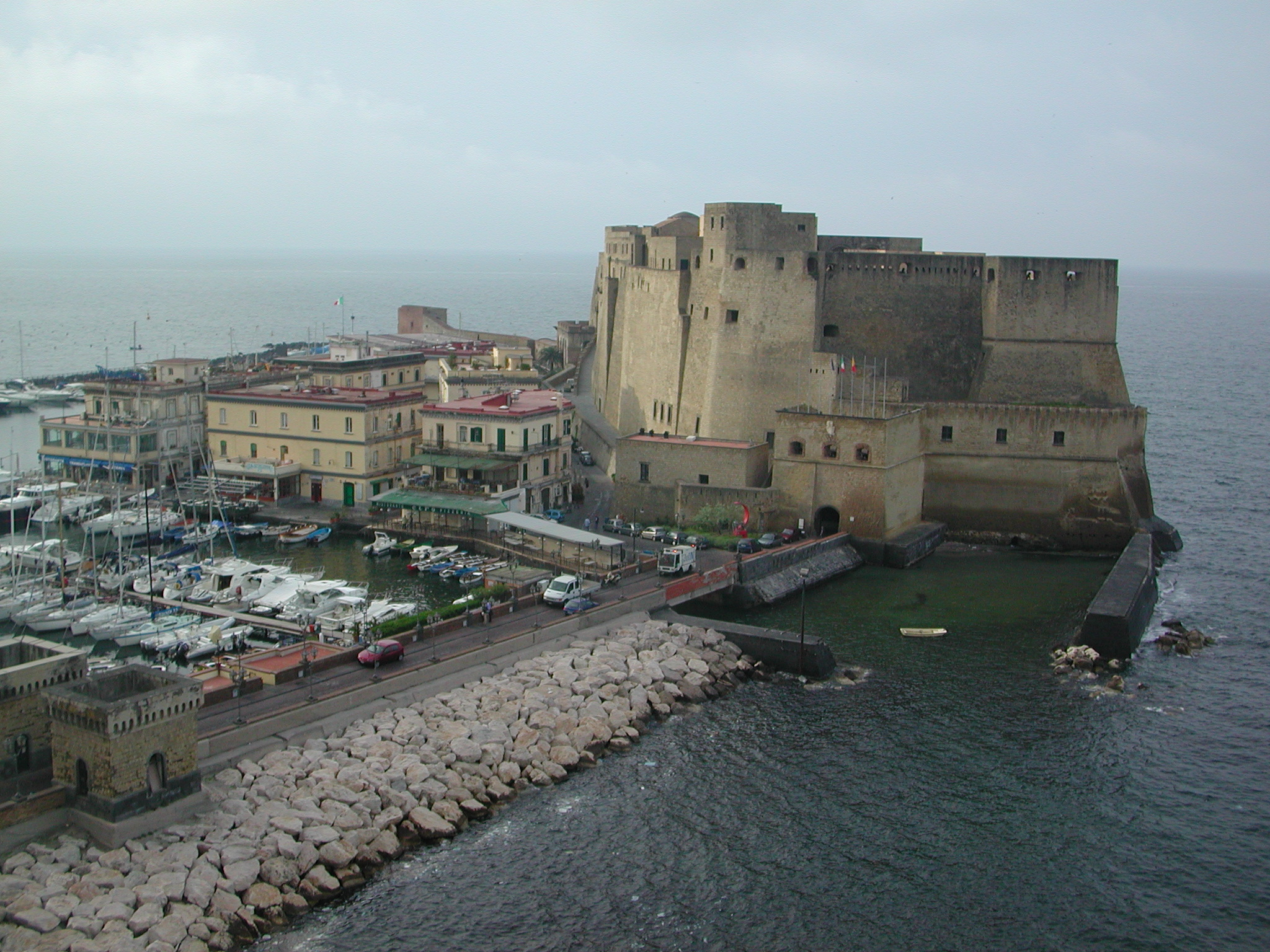
Castel dell'Ovo (Gulf of Naples)

Year 476 (CDLXXVI) was a leap year starting on Thursday of the Julian calendar. At the time, it was known as the Year of the Consulship of Basiliscus and Armatus (or, less frequently, year 1229 Ab urbe condita). The denomination 476 for this year has been used since the early medieval period, when the Anno Domini calendar era became the prevalent method in Europe for naming years.

Because the fall of the Western Roman Empire occurred in 476, many historians consider it the last year of ancient history and the first year of the Middle Ages in Europe.

== Events ==
=== By place ===
==== Roman Empire ====
- Summer – Odoacer, chieftain of the Germanic tribes (Herulic/Scirian foederati), visits the imperial palace at Ravenna. He petitions Orestes (magister militum) to reward his mercenaries for their services and their support of his rebellion a year earlier, by making good on his promise to grant them lands to settle permanently in Italy. Orestes refuses this proposal and Odoacer leads his tribesmen in a revolt.
- August – Basiliscus, Roman usurper, is deposed and Zeno is restored as emperor of the Eastern Roman Empire. With the support of his adviser Illus, he besieges Constantinople, but the Senate opens the gates, allowing him to resume the throne. Basiliscus flees to sanctuary in a church, but surrenders himself and his family after extracting a solemn promise from Zeno not to shed their blood. Basiliscus is sent to a fortress in Cappadocia, where he later dies from starvation.
- August 23 – Odoacer, age 43, is proclaimed rex Italiae ("king of Italy") by his troops. He leads his Ostrogoth army into the Po Valley, and advances to Ravenna while plundering the countryside.
- August 28 – Orestes is arrested by Odoacer near Piacenza, and swiftly executed.
- September 4 – Romulus Augustulus, Roman usurper of the Western Roman Empire, is deposed by Odoacer at Ravenna. Odoacer spares the boy's life and gives him a pension of 6,000 solidi, but exiles him to the "Castellum Lucullanum" (Castel dell'Ovo), on the island of Megaride in the Gulf of Naples. This event will later be romanticized in Western literature and history as the Fall of Western Rome, and is traditionally used by historians to mark the beginning of the European Middle Ages.
- Julius Nepos, de jure ruler, becomes legally the last "Western Roman Emperor". He governs Dalmatia (Balkans), Morocco, and Northwest Gaul until his death in 480, but has no effective power on the Italian Peninsula.
- Odoacer crosses the Maritime Alps with a Gothic army and invades Provence (Southern Gaul). He conquers the cities of Arles and Marseille, after a victorious battle against the Burgundians.
- The Visigoths under King Euric march into Italy, and suffer defeat against the forces of Odoacer. Emperor Zeno concludes a peace treaty between the Goths and Odoacer surrenders the newly conquered territory in Gaul. Euric pledges himself to undertake no further hostilities.
- The Roman Senate petitions Zeno to recognize Nepos as deposed and take the sole emperorship himself, abolishing the 81-year-long east/west division of the empire and recognizing Odoacer's authority in Italy. Zeno declines the first request, but names Odoacer Patricius, investing his rule with Imperial legitimacy.
- Winter – Zeno recognizes the full extent of the Vandal Kingdom, including all of western Africa, the Balearic Islands, Corsica, Sardinia and Sicily. King Gaiseric gives Sicily, with the exception of the city of Lilybaeum, to Odoacer in return for tribute.

==== India ====
- The birth of Aryabhata is traditionally regarded as the beginning of the classical period of Indian mathematics and astronomy.

==== China ====
- Xian Wen Di, Retired Emperor of Northern Wei, is murdered by Empress Feng. She assumes regency over the young Xiao Wen Di.

=== By topic ===
==== Religion ====
- Peter the Fuller is restored as patriarch of Antioch.

== Births ==
- December – Aryabhata, Indian mathematician and astronomer (d. 550)
- Hilary of Galeata, Christian monk and saint (d. 558)

== Deaths ==
- August
  - Basiliscus, Emperor of the Eastern Roman Empire
  - Marcus, co-Emperor of the Eastern Roman Empire
- August 28 – Orestes, Roman politician and regent
- Xian Wen Di, Chinese Emperor of Northern Wei (b. 454)
