= Leo II (emperor) =

Eastern Roman emperor in 474

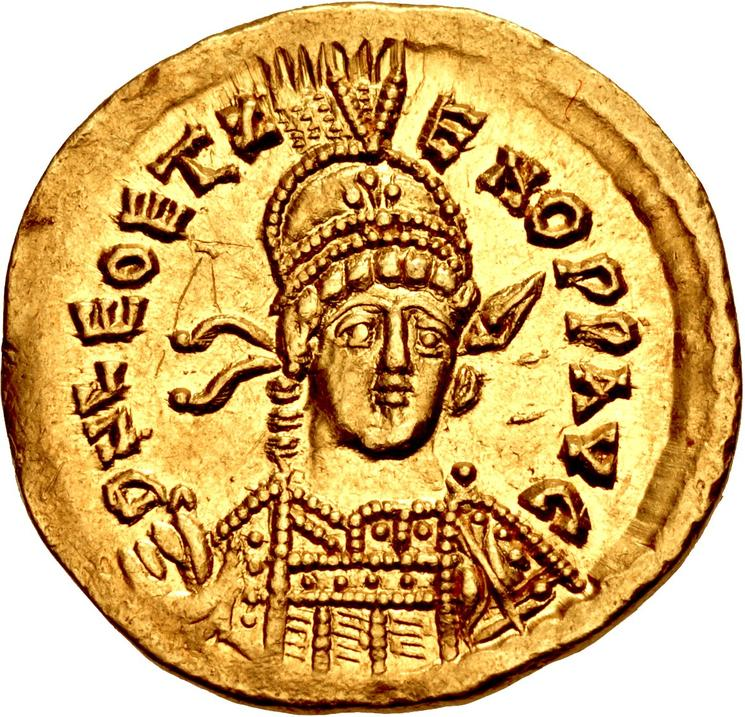
- Solidus of Leo II, marked: d·n· leo et zeno p·p· aug·

Roman emperor of the East
- Augustus: 17 November 473 – November 474
- Coronation: 17 November 473
- Predecessor: Leo I
- Successor: Zeno
- Alongside: See list: Leo I (until 18 January); Zeno (from 29 January); Glycerius (West, 473–474); Julius Nepos (West, 474)
- Caesar: October 472 – November 473
- Born: c. 467
- Died: November 474 (aged 7); Constantinople
- Burial: Church of the Holy Apostles
Regnal name
- Latin: Imperator Caesar Leo Augustus; Ancient Greek: Αὐτοκράτωρ καῖσαρ Λέων αὐγουστος
- Dynasty: Leonid
- Father: Zeno
- Mother: Ariadne

Leo II (Latin: Leo; Ancient Greek: Λέων, Leōn; c. 467 – November 474), called the Younger, briefly reigned as a child emperor of the Eastern Roman Empire from 473 to 474. He was the son of Zeno, the Isaurian general and future emperor, and Ariadne, a daughter of the emperor Leo I (r. 457–474). Leo II was made co-emperor with his grandfather Leo I on 17 November 473, and became sole emperor on 18 January 474 after Leo I died of dysentery. His father Zeno was made co-emperor by the Byzantine Senate on 29 January, and they co-ruled for a short time before Leo II died in late 474. He is sometimes surnamed with the epithet "the Small" (Latin: Minor; Ancient Greek: ὁ Μικρός, romanized: o Mikrós), probably to distinguish him from his grandfather and augustus Leo I (Ancient Greek: ὁ Μέγας, romanized: ō Mégas, lit. 'the Great'). (Note: Bury 1958, Chapter X: the reign of Leo I, p. 323, note 1. "After the coronation of the child the two Leos would be distinguished as Λέων ὁ Μέγας and Λέων ὁ Μικρός, and this I believe, must be the origin of the designation of Leo as 'the Great'; just as reversely Theodosius II. was called 'the Small', because in his infancy he had been known as ὁ μικρός βασιλεύς to distinguish him from Arcadius. Leo never did anything which could conceivably earn him the title of Great in the sense in which it was bestowed by posterity on Alexander or Constantine.")

== History ==
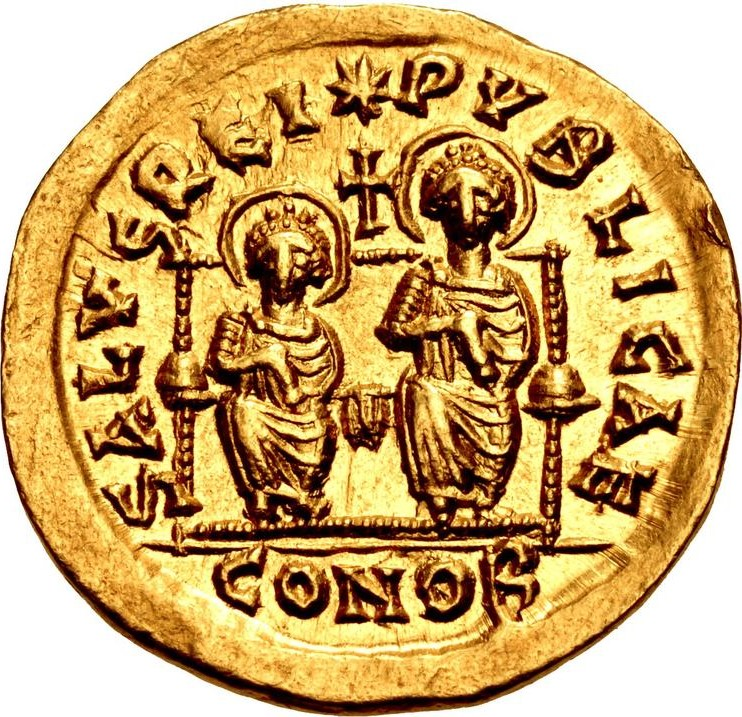
Solidus of Leo II, showing Leo and Zeno enthroned and nimbate and each holding a mappa, marked: salus reipublicae ("the Welfare of the Republic")

Leo II, called "the Younger", was born in 467, (Note: Some modern authors, relying on a passage of the Life of Daniel the Stylite (c. 495), date his birth to 469.) the son of Zeno, an Isaurian general, and Ariadne, the daughter of then-emperor Leo I. He was the maternal grandson of Emperor Leo I and Empress Verina. As the grandson of Leo I, Leo II had a strong claim to succeed his throne. Leo I, who was becoming increasingly ill, felt obligated to declare a successor to the imperial throne, but passed over his son-in-law on account of his unpopularity. Accordingly, Leo II was made caesar (heir to the throne) by Leo I around October 472, (Note: The writers of the Prosopography of the Later Roman Empire and other authors relied for the 473 date on the arguments of Otto Seeck, who followed Theodorus Lector and Kedrenos in linking Leo II's elevation to caesar with the eruption of Mount Vesuvius. However, modern scholars date the event to 472.) and was later promoted to augustus (also by Leo I) in November 473, making him co-emperor alongside his grandfather. He was crowned at the Hippodrome of Constantinople, and the ceremony was presided over by the Ecumenical Patriarch Acacius. The 10th-century De Ceremoniis gives a detailed account of his coronation as augustus, which is dated to 17 November 473. (Note: Some authors have argued that the date given refers not to Leo II's elevation, but to his death. This, however, would necessitate labeling the entire document as fake, which is highly unlikely.) He was also appointed as the sole consul for 474 around this time.

When Leo I died of dysentery on 18 January 474, Leo II acceded to the throne as sole augustus. The historian Warren Treadgold wrote that during the reign of Leo II, his father Zeno was the true power behind the throne. On 29 January 474, (Note: John Malalas gives Leo I's death and Zeno's coronation as 3 and 9 February respectively, while the Auctarium Prosperi Havniense gives 18 and 29 January. The latter source is often thought to be more accurate, hence why Leo's death is usually given as 18 January. However, and contradictorily, scholars often used 9 February for Zeno's coronation.) the Byzantine Senate, with the approval of Empress Verina, made his father Zeno co-augustus under Leo II, as Leo was too young to sign official documents. Leo II died in Constantinople shortly after 10 October 474. The 6th-century writer John Malalas states that he reigned "1 year and 23 days", which, reckoning from his coronation as augustus, would give a death date of 8/9 December. However, he also states that Leo died on "November of the 13th indiction... as was written by the most learned Nestorianos, whose chronicle ended with Leo". Theodorus Lector, another 6th-century historian, states that Leo II died after a rule of 10 months, that is, from January to November 474. This is also corroborated by the 9th-century writer Theophanes the Confessor. The 20th-century Byzantinist George Ostrogorsky simply wrote that Leo II died sometime in the autumn of 474. He died aged 7, which is corroborated by the 6th-century writers John Malalas and John of Ephesus. The death of Leo II left Zeno as sole emperor.

His death having occurred so soon after he became emperor has led to speculation among some modern scholars that he was poisoned by either his mother or father so that Zeno could become sole emperor. However, no contemporary sources raised this suggestion even though Zeno was unpopular; thus it is considered likely that Leo II's death was natural, especially taking into account the high child mortality rate of the time. Victor of Tunnuna, a 6th-century chronicler, says that Leo II did not actually die, but was rather taken by Ariadne and hidden at a monastery. This is likely a confusion with Basiliscus, the son of the Byzantine commander Armatus. Basiliscus was crowned caesar in 476 and was almost executed in 477 after his father was murdered by Zeno, but was saved by Ariadne. The confusion likely stems from the fact that Basiliscus was renamed Leo in order to avoid association with the usurper who rose against Zeno.

Zeno was vastly unpopular due to a lack of dynastic prestige, with his only familial ties to the imperial throne being his marriage to Ariadne, the daughter of Leo I, and through his now-dead son Leo II. Additionally, because he was an Isaurian, he was seen as a foreigner by the Byzantine elite, and the treasury was empty on his ascension. Zeno's sole rule was opposed by general Basiliscus, brother of Verina, the widow of Leo I, who proclaimed him as emperor in January 475. Zeno fled, and Basiliscus ruled for 20 months before Zeno returned and retook the throne. Zeno's rule was marked by constant revolts, and it was only through cunning, bribery and luck that he managed to rule for 17 years until his death on 9 April 491.

Leo II (emperor) Leonid dynasty Born: 467 Died: November 474
Regnal titles
Preceded by Leo I	Eastern Roman emperor 474	Succeeded by Zeno
Political offices
Preceded by Leo I	Roman consul 474	Succeeded by Zeno
