= Emil Ritterling =

German historian and archaeologist

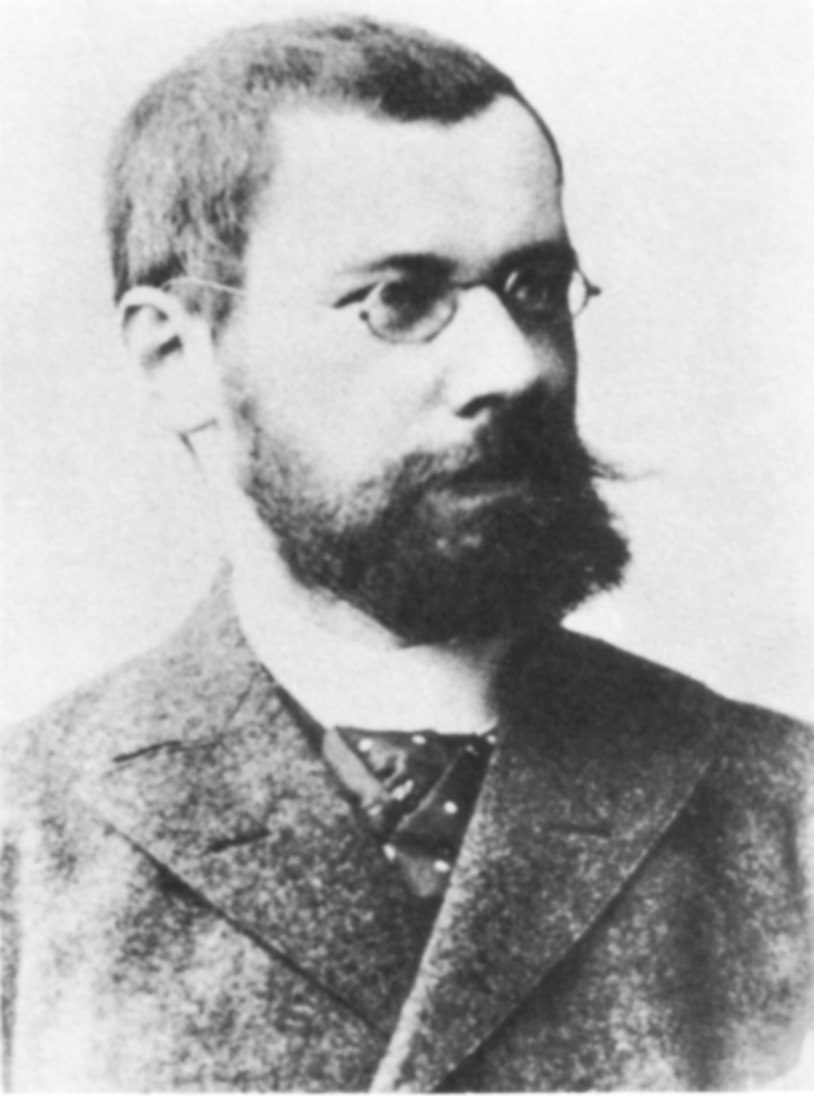
Emil Ritterling

Emil Ritterling (20 December 1861, in Leipzig – 7 February 1928, in Wiesbaden) was a German historian and archaeologist.

He studied classical philology and history at the universities of Bonn and Leipzig, and afterwards worked for several years as a librarian in Berlin (1887–91). In 1892 he relocated to Wiesbaden, where he eventually became a member of the Imperial Limes Commission. In 1899–1911 and 1915–23 he was director of the Nassau Regional Museum of Archaeology in Wiesbaden, and from 1911 to 1914 was head of Roman-Germanic Commission of the German Archaeological Institute in Frankfurt am Main. In 1902 he received the title of professor.

== Selected works ==
- De Legione Romanorum X Gemina, 1885 – The Legio X Gemina.
- Römische Münzen aus Wiesbaden und Umgegend im Altertums-Museum zu Wiesbaden, 1896 – Roman coins from Wiesbaden and its environs at the Antiquities Museum in Wiesbaden.
- Zum römischen Heerwesen des ausgehenden dritten Jahrhunderts, 1903 – On the Roman army of the third century.
- Das frührömische lager bei Hofheim im Taunus, 1904 – An early Roman camp at Hofheim am Taunus.
- Das Kastell Niederbieber Ausgrabungsbericht, 1912 – The castle at Niederbieber excavation report.
- Ein Amtsabzeichen der beneficiarii consularis im Museum zu Wiesbaden, 1919 – An official badge of beneficiarii consularis in the museum at Wiesbaden.
- Fasti des römischen Deutschland unter dem Prinzipat (with Edmund Groag, edited by Ernst Stein, 1932) – Fasti of Roman Germania under the Principate.
- Die kaiserlichen Beamten und Truppenkörper im römischen Deutschland unter dem Prinzipat (edited by Ernst Stein, 1932) – The imperial officials and troops in Roman Germania under the Principate.
