= Verina =

Eastern Roman empress from 457 to 474

- Augusta
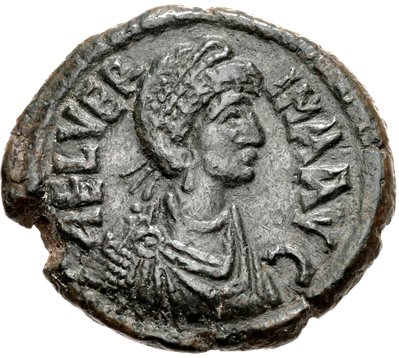
- Coin of Verina

Empress of the Roman Empire
- Tenure: 457 – 474
- Died: 484; Papyrius fortress, Isauria (modern-day Bozkır, Konya, Turkey)
- Spouse: Leo I the Thracian
- Issue: Ariadne, Leontia, unnamed son
Names
- Aelia Verina
- Dynasty: Leo

Aelia Verina (Latin: Verina, Greek: Βερίνα; died 484) was the Eastern Roman empress as the wife of Leo I. She was a sister of Emperor Basiliscus. Her daughter Ariadne also became empress. Verina was the maternal grandmother of Leo II.

== Family ==
The origins of Verina and her brother Basiliscus are unknown. They are considered likely to have ancestry in the Balkans but nothing more specific is known. They are assumed to have at least one sister as a hagiography of Daniel the Stylite names a brother-in-law of Verina and Basiliscus as Zuzus.

Stefan Krautschick in his historical work Zwei Aspekte des Jahres 476 (1986) advanced a theory that the two siblings were related to Odoacer, the first barbarian King of Italy. The theory relies on passage 209.1 in the fragmentary chronicle of John of Antioch, a 7th-century monk. The chronicler has been tentatively identified with John of the Sedre, Syrian Orthodox Patriarch of Antioch from 641 to 648. The passage records the assassination of Armatus by Onoulphus. Based on interpretation Odoacer was brother to either Onoulphus alone or to both men. The second interpretation was introduced by Krautschick and has gained the support of (among others) Alexander Demandt and Patrick Amory. Armatus was identified as nephew of Verina and Basiliscus in other Byzantine sources, including a hagiography of Daniel the Stylite and the Suda. The theory would make both Onoulphus and Odoacer nephews of Verina and Basiliscus.

However a counterargument to the theory is given by Penny Macgeorge in her own study Late Roman Warlords (2003), pages 284–285, based on the silence of both John Malalas and Malchus on a blood relation of Odoacer to the House of Leo. Both historians were chronologically closer to the recorded events than John of Antioch.

If accepted the theory of Krautschick would give Verina a barbarian origin. Her ancestry would still be uncertain due to contradictory accounts on the ancestry of Odoacer. Various sources have identified him as one of the Goths, the Rugians, the Sciri and the Thuringii. All four were Germanic peoples, with the Goths, Rugians and Sciri grouped by ethnologists within the East Germanic tribes. His father Edeko was leader of the Sciri but it is unclear if he was born in the tribe or married into it. Other sources identify Edeko as one of the Huns, possibly because of his service under Attila the Hun. According to Amory, the varying ethnographic identities of both men may reflect both their mixed ancestry and their political association with the various groups.

The presence of Verina in the Roman court has been attributed by Demandt to "the osmosis of the late Roman and Germanic aristocracies". In other words, the practice of intermarriage between the Roman military aristocracy and the dynasties derived from it on the one hand and various Germanic families of foederati.

== Marriage ==
Verina married Leo, a Thraco-Roman officer of the East Roman army. According to Jordanes and John Malalas, her husband was one of the Bessi, a tribe of Thracians. Theodorus Lector, Theophanes the Confessor, Georgios Kedrenos and Michael the Syrian report Leo born in Thrace. However the Bibliotheca of Patriarch Photios I of Constantinople quotes Candidus in placing his birthplace in Dacia.

Verina and Leo had three children. Their eldest daughter Ariadne was born prior to the death of Marcian (reigned 450–457). Ariadne had a younger sister, Leontia. Leontia was first betrothed to Julius Patricius, a son of Aspar, but their engagement was probably annulled when Aspar and another of his sons, Ardabur, were assassinated in 471. Leontia then married Marcian, a son of Anthemius and Marcia Euphemia. The couple led a failed revolt against Zeno in 478–479. They were exiled to Isauria following their defeat.

An unnamed son was born in 463. He died five months following his birth. The only sources about him are a horoscope by Rhetorius and a hagiography of Daniel the Stylite.

== Empress consort ==
In January, 457 Marcian succumbed to a disease, allegedly gangrene. He was survived by his daughter Euphemia and his son-in-law Anthemius. Leo was at this point the tribune of the Mattiarii, a regiment wielding the mattea (Latin for mace) as their weapon.

Marcian had been proclaimed an Augustus while marrying Pulcheria, sister of Theodosius II. Due to the marriage, he was considered a member of the Theodosian dynasty. His only daughter was from a previous marriage and not considered heiress to the dynasty, thus with his death the dynastic succession ended. The Byzantine army and the Byzantine Senate had to elect a new Augustus. Aspar, the magister militum ("Master of soldiers") of the Eastern Roman Empire, may have been unable to claim the throne for himself due to his Alanic origins and Arian religious beliefs. Though his family had served in the Roman military for generations, Aspar was still considered a barbarian and the majority of the ruling class of the Eastern Roman Empire had accepted the Nicene Creed.

Aspar used his influence in order to become a kingmaker, having earlier engineered the elevation of Marcian who had served a middler-rank officer under him. He was able to pick Leo, a candidate among his own subordinate officers, probably counting on his continued loyalty. The Senate accepted the choice. On 7 February 457, Leo was crowned by Patriarch Anatolius of Constantinople, the first such coronation known to involve a Patriarch. At this point Verina became the Empress consort. She probably added "Aelia" to her name at her proclamation as an Augusta. The name had become standard for Augustas of the Theodosian dynasty. During her tenure as empress, she exerted influence over her husband and his court, living a life of luxurious royal comfort and peaceful.

In 461, Leo founded the Excubitors as a counterbalance to the soldiers under Aspar. He recruited the majority of its members from among the sturdy and warlike Isaurians. In 466, Tarasicodissa, an Isaurian officer of the Excubitors came forth with evidence that Ardabur, a son of Aspar, was guilty of treason. The scandal caused a rift in the relations of Leo and Aspar, leaving the former relying even more on the Excubitors.

In 467, the alliance of Leo and Tarasicodissa was sealed with the marriage of Ariadne to the officer. To make himself more acceptable to the Roman hierarchy and the native Greek-speaking population of Constantinople, the new son-in-law of the imperial couple changed his name to Zeno. Their only known son of Ariadne and Zeno, Leo II, was born within the year.

In 471, Aspar and Ardabur were murdered within the Great Palace of Constantinople by orders of Leo. Leo earned the nickname "Macelles" (the Butcher) for the manner of the deaths. Zeno was left by default as the main supporter of Leo within the Byzantine army.

Leo II was proclaimed Caesar in October, 473 and effectively became the designated heir to the throne by virtue of being the closest male relative of Leo I. On 18 January 474, Leo I died of dysentery. Their grandson immediately succeeded him. Verina remained at the Palace.

== Widowed empress ==
Leo I died on 18 January 474 and was succeeded by his grandson Leo II, who had been crowned co-emperor on 17 November 473. Since Leo II was too young to rule himself, Verina and Ariadne as his guardians and elders of the imperial family prevailed upon him to crown Zeno as co-emperor, which he did on February 9, 474. When Leo became ill and died on November 17 in aged 7, Zeno became sole emperor with Ariadne as empress. But Verina, who had unofficially served as regent during her grandson's short reign, was unhappy with the new situation.

Also, Verina was not content in the role of a widow. According to both Candidus and John of Antioch, she found a lover in the person of Patricius, a former Praetorian prefect. Verina had originally supported Zeno while the young emperor Leo II was still alive. Not long after her grandson's death, Verina turned against her son-in-law. She still retained imperial status with a portion of the palace for herself, but she still harbored ambitions for her former position. John Malalas attributes her hostility to an argument between them over a request the senior empress had made on her son-in-law. Malalas does not clarify what was the request. A modern interpretation suggests that the request concerned her second marriage to Patricius. Which Zeno had reasons to refuse to prevent Patricius from emerging as a rival candidate for the throne.

Verina conspired against Zeno with her lover Patricius, her brother Basiliscus, the Isaurian general Illus, and general Theodoric Strabo, forcing Zeno to flee Constantinople in 475. Zeno fled to his native lands, bringing with him some of the Isaurians living in Constantinople, and the imperial treasury. Basiliscus was then acclaimed as Augustus on 9 January 475 at the Hebdomon palace, by the palace ministers and the Senate.

John of Antioch and the hagiography of Daniel the Stylite imply that Verina was tricked in supporting the conspiracy. Candidus and John of Antioch report that Verina was hoping to use the conspiracy to replace Zeno with Patricius, restoring herself to the position of empress in the process. However, Basiliscus was crowned as soon as Zeno had abandoned the city. According to Malalas, Verina had to crown Basiliscus herself as the only person of imperial rank present within the capital. There is some doubt whether the description of Verina's motivation by Candidus and John of Antioch was accurate or just reflected the hostility of the chroniclers to her.

Whatever the case, Patricius served early in the new reign as the Magister Officiorum. Eventually, Basiliscus ordered the death of Patricius, as the officer was a natural candidate to overthrow the new emperor. Consequently, Verina later intrigued against Basiliscus, seeking revenge for her lover's execution. According to Candidus, after the death of Patricius, Verina intrigued in favour of Zeno, but her plan was discovered by Basiliscus, and only the intercession of Armatus spared her life.

In 476, both Illus and Armatus defected to the side of Zeno, who, in August, besieged Constantinople. Theodoric the Amal (later known as Theodoric the Great), the leader of the Pannonian Goths, had allied to Zeno. Theodoric would have attacked Basiliscus and his Thracian Goth foederati led by Theodoric Strabo, receiving, in exchange, the title of magister militum held by Strabo and the payments previously given to the Thracian Goths. It has been suggested that Constantinople was defenseless during Zeno's siege because the Magister Militum Strabo had moved north to counter this menace. The Senate opened the gates of the city to Zeno, allowing the deposed emperor to retake the throne with Ariadne as empress.

== Rivalry with Illus ==
The brief reign of Basiliscus does not seem to have resulted in lasting hatred between Verina and either Zeno or Ariadne. However it did result in hatred between Verina and the turncoat general Illus. The hagiography of Daniel the Stylite considers Illus responsible for pulling Verina into the initial conspiracy while hiding its actual goals. He was, in her mind, directly or indirectly responsible for the death of Patricius.

In 477, a first assassination attempt on Illus was prevented by a slave. Though primary sources do not associate Verina with it, later historians have suggested that this was indeed the case. In 478, a second assassination attempt on Illus was prevented by Epinicus, a long-time favourite of Verina. Epinicus allowed Illus custody of the prisoner and the interrogation resulted in a confession implicating Verina.

Illus recuperated from the attack in his native Isauria and reportedly refused to return to Constantinople while Verina was still residing in the Palace. Zeno agreed to banish her from the capital and she indeed never returned during her life. According to John of Antioch, Verina was at first confined in a monastery located at Tarsus. She was then sent first to Dalisandus (two namesake cities existed in Isauria and Pamphylia) and secondly to Cherris in Isauria.

In 478–479, the revolt of Marcian, a son of Anthemius took place. He was married to Leontia, the second daughter of Leo I and Verina. His claim to the throne relied on his wife being a Porphyrogenita. In theory Leontia outranking her older sister Ariadne who was born previous to the elevation of her parents to the throne. Marcian and his brothers Procopius and Romulus launched their coup d'état in Constantinople. They were besieging the palace when Illus arrived with reinforcements from Chalcedon. John of Antioch attributes the entire revolt to Verina but the actual extent of her involvement is uncertain.

In 480, Verina was still confined in Isauria under the custody of Illus. However she was able to correspond with Ariadne and convinced her daughter to intervene on her behalf. Ariadne endeavoured to obtain her release, first from Zeno, and then from Illus, to whom the emperor referred her. Illus not only refused her request, but charged her with wishing to place another person on her husband's throne. This irritated her; and she, like her mother, attempted to assassinate Illus. Jordanes ascribes her hatred to another cause: he says that Illus had infused jealous suspicions into Zeno's mind which had led Zeno to try an attempt on her life, and that her knowledge of these things stimulated her to revenge. The assassin whom she employed failed to kill Illus, but cut off his ear in the attempt. The assassin was taken, and Zeno, who appears to have been privy to the affair, was unable to prevent his execution.

== Alliance with Illus ==
In 483 or 484, Illus rose in rebellion against Zeno. Verina still had her imperial rank and so could still crown another Augustus. He released her from confinement and had her crown Leontius, a general, as an Augustus in Tarsus. The revolt also had religious meaning as the rebels were Chalcedonian Christians while Zeno was an adherent of Monophysitism.

John Malalas describes that Verina joined the new alliance with fervor, corresponding with various cities and trying to win their support for the revolt. However, there is some doubt over the sincerity of both her new convictions and her political "friendship" with her old enemy. She may in effect have still been Illus' prisoner and acted under his command to preserve her safety. She notably did not join Leontius and Illus in their campaign for Antioch but was sent to the fortress of Papyrius in Isauria.

The revolt failed to gain sufficient support and the rebels had to withdraw from Antioch back to Papyrius. Zeno sent an army including both Romans and Ostrogoths under John the Scythian which managed to defeat them. The fort was besieged from 484 to 488. Verina died early in the siege; whether her death was violent or not is uncertain. According to Malalas, when the siege ended the corpse of Verina was recovered and sent to Ariadne for burial.

== Possible descendants ==
The Georgian Chronicle, a 13th-century compilation drawing from earlier sources, reports a marriage of Vakhtang I of Iberia to Princess Helena of Byzantium, identifying her as a daughter of the predecessor of Zeno. This predecessor was probably Leo I, the tale attributing a third daughter to Verina.

Cyril Toumanoff identified two children of this marriage. Mithridates of Iberia and Leo of Iberia. This younger Leo was father of Guaram I of Iberia. The accuracy of the descent is unknown.

== Notes ==
Royal titles
Preceded by Pulcheria	Byzantine Empress consort 457–474	Succeeded by Ariadne
