= Nestorianus =

Nestorianus (Greek: Νεστοριανός, Nestorianos) was a Greek historian who wrote a chronicle that covered the Roman Empire down to 474. It is considered lost and is known only through its use by John Malalas and the anonymous author of the Chronicon Paschale.

Nestorianus may have been personally known to Malalas, who calls him a "chronographer". The information that Malalas cites to Nestorianus' chronicle mainly concerns the "reign lengths, ages and modes of death of emperors." It may have been little more than a detailed list of emperors. Still, it has been argued that Nestorianus was the source for Malalas' early Christian history, including the date of the ascension of Jesus (AD 31). It is unclear if the chronicle began with Creation or with the Roman Empire.

The information cited to Nestorianus is mainly found in the section on the Constantinian dynasty. According to Malalas, the chronicle of "the most learned" Nestorianus ended with the death of Emperor Leo II in November 474. From that point on in his own work, Malalas no longer provides descriptions of the emperors' appearance, which suggests that he may have taken these from the work of Nestorianus.

The historian Edwin Patzig argues that Nestorianus was the same person as Domninus, another one of Malalas' sources, and that "Nestorianus" was merely a description of his religious affiliation (i.e., he was a Nestorian).

The citation in the Chronicon Paschale, to the death of Leo II, is probably derived from Malalas.
