= Ariadne (empress) =

Eastern Roman empress from 474 to 515

- Augusta
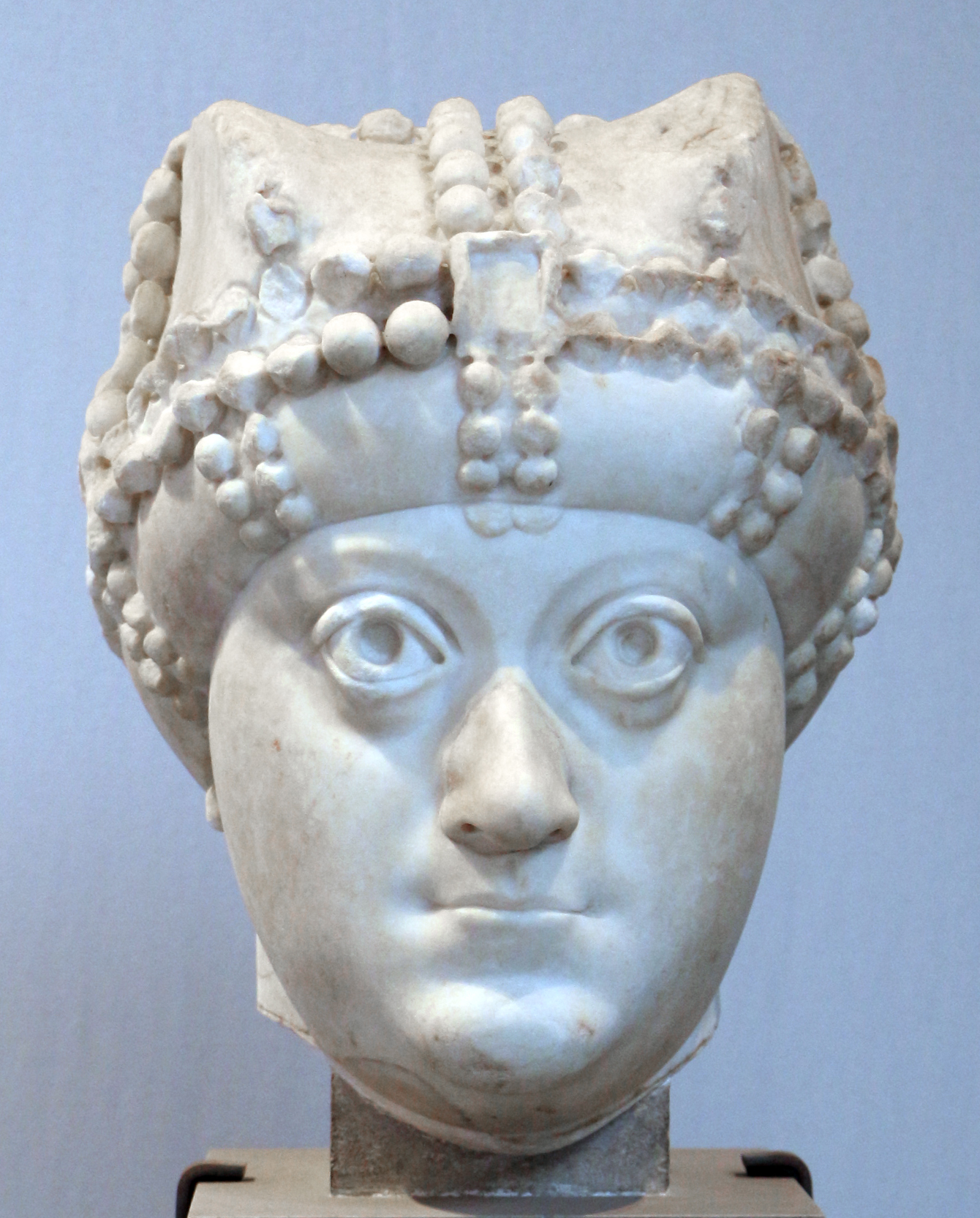
- Marble head identified as empress Ariadne, Louvre Museum

Eastern Roman empress
- 1st Tenure: 474–475
- 2nd Tenure: 476–515
- Born: before 457
- Died: 515; Constantinople (now Istanbul, Turkey)
- Burial: Church of the Holy Apostles
- Spouse: Zeno; Anastasius I
- Issue: Leo II
Names
- Aelia Ariadne Augusta
- Dynasty: Leo
- Father: Leo I the Thracian
- Mother: Verina

Aelia Ariadne (Latin: Ariadne, Greek: Ἀριάδνη) (c. 450 – 515) was Eastern Roman empress as the wife of Zeno and Anastasius I. She is venerated as a saint in the Eastern Orthodox Church, with her feast day falling on August 22.

== Family ==
Ariadne was the eldest daughter of Leo I and Verina. Her mother was a sister of Basiliscus.

Ariadne's younger sister, Leontia, was first betrothed to Patricius, a son of Aspar. Their engagement was probably annulled when Aspar and another of his sons, Ardabur, were assassinated in 471. Leontia then married Marcian, a son of Emperor Anthemius. The couple led a failed revolt against Zeno in 478–479. They were exiled to Isauria following their defeat.

An unnamed younger brother was born in 463. He died five months following his birth. The only sources about him are a horoscope by Rhetorius and a hagiography of Daniel the Stylite.

== Marriage ==
Ariadne was born prior to the death of Marcian (reigned 450–457). In January 457, Marcian succumbed to a disease, allegedly gangrene. He was survived by his daughter Marcia Euphemia and his son-in-law Anthemius.

Leo was at this point the tribune of the Mattiarii, a regiment wielding the mattea (Latin for mace) as their weapon. He was proclaimed emperor with the support of Aspar, the magister militum ("Master of soldiers"). On 7 February 457, Leo was crowned by Patriarch Anatolius of Constantinople, the first such coronation known to involve a patriarch. At this point Ariadne became a member of the imperial family.

In 461, Leo founded the Excubitors as a counterbalance to the Germanic soldiers under Aspar. He recruited the majority of its members from among the sturdy and warlike Isaurians. In 466, Tarasicodissa, an Isaurian officer of the Excubitors, came forth with evidence that Ardabur, a son of Aspar, was guilty of treason. The scandal caused Leo to distance himself from Aspar and rely even more on the Excubitors.

In 467, the alliance of Leo and Tarasicodissa was sealed with the marriage of Ariadne to the officer. To make himself more acceptable to the Roman hierarchy and the primarily Greek-speaking population of Constantinople, her husband changed his name to Zeno. Their only known son, Leo II, was born within the year.

== Son's reign ==
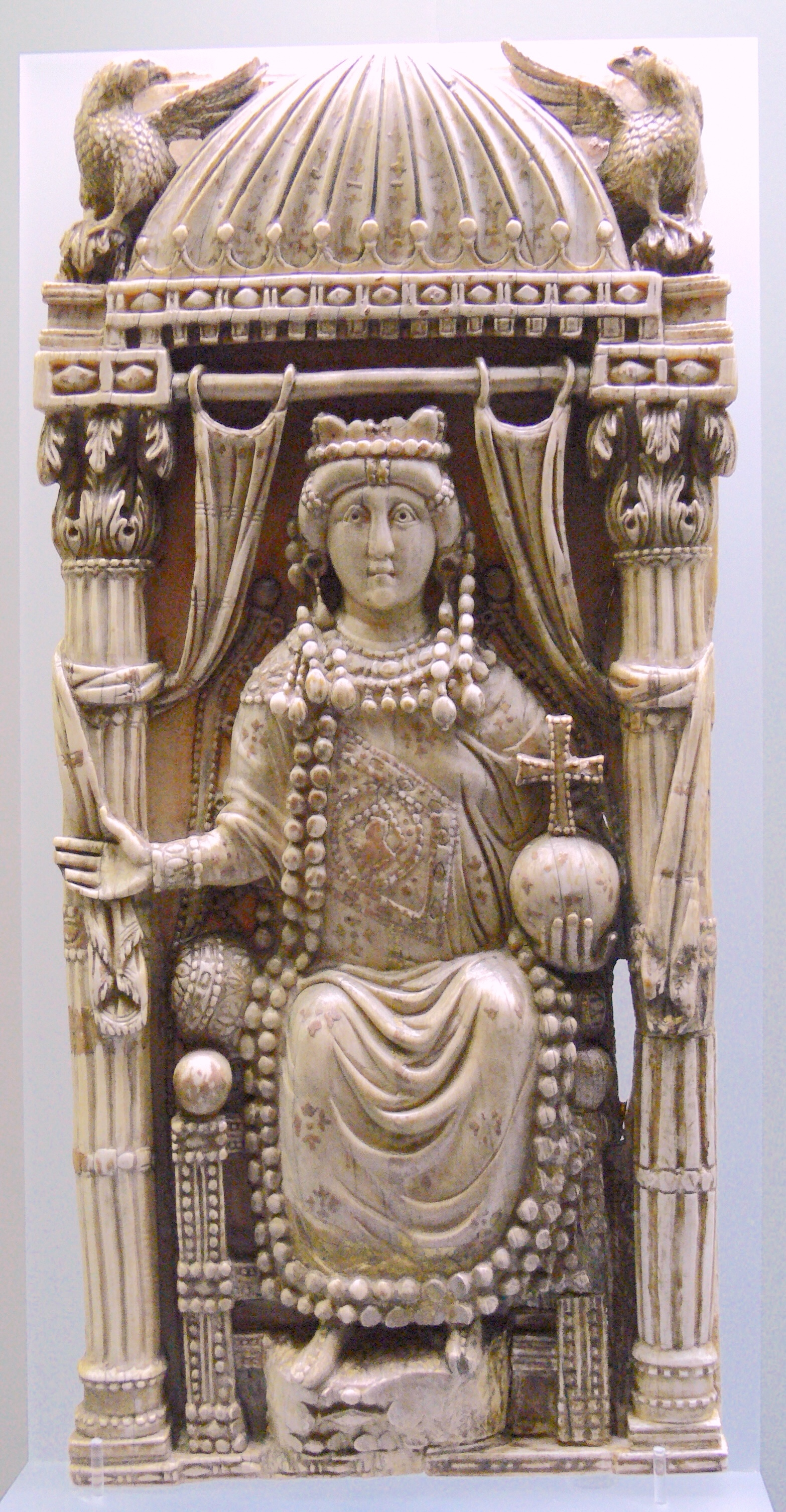
Diptych leaf of Ariadne

In 471, Aspar and Ardabur were murdered within the Great Palace of Constantinople on the order of Leo. Leo earned the nickname "Macelles" (the Butcher) for the manner of the deaths. Zeno was left by default as the main supporter of Leo within the Byzantine army.

Leo II was proclaimed Caesar in October 473 and effectively became the designated heir to the throne by virtue of being the closest male relative of Leo I. On 18 January 474, Leo I died of dysentery. His grandson immediately succeeded him.

Since Leo II was too young to rule himself, Ariadne and her mother Verina prevailed upon him to crown Zeno as co-emperor, which he did on 9 February 474. When Leo became ill and died on 17 November, Zeno became sole emperor with Ariadne as empress.

== Empress of Zeno ==
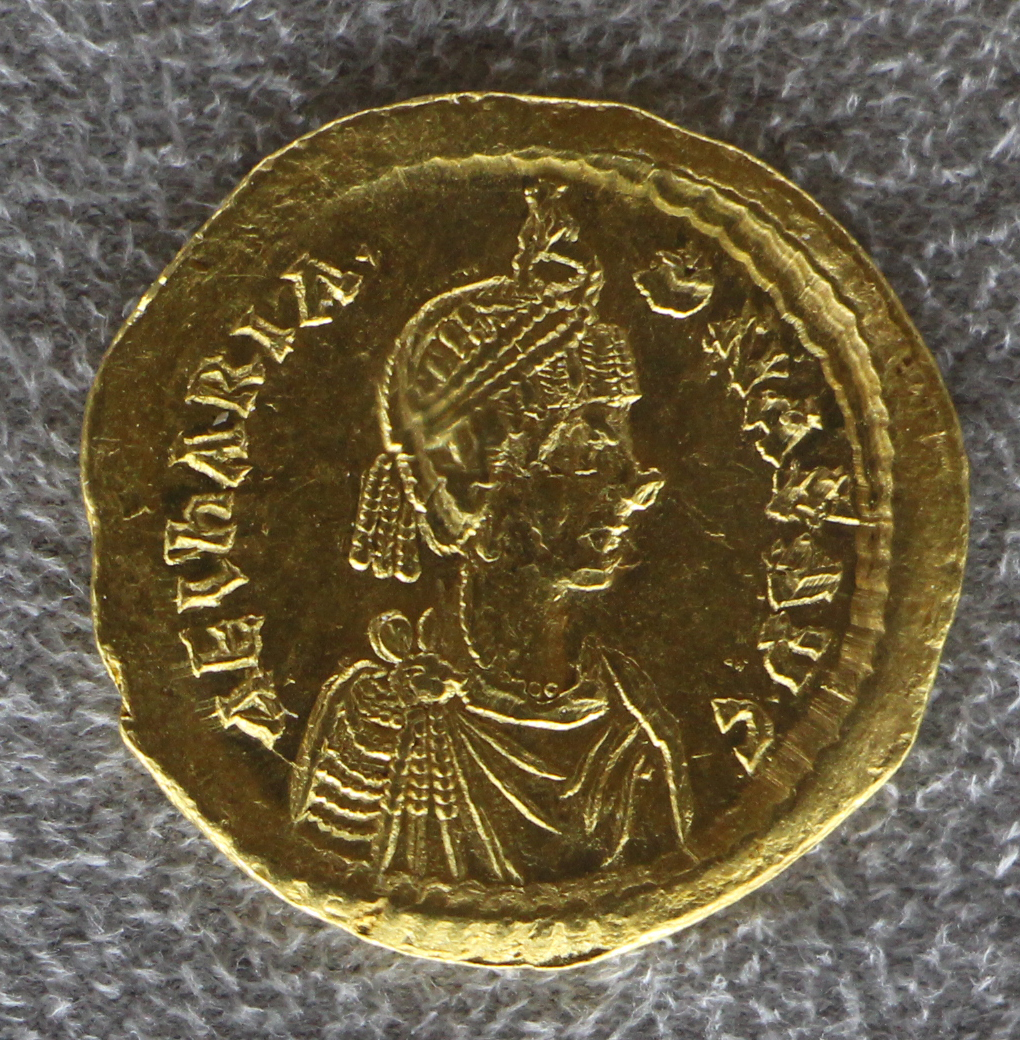
Solidus of Ariadne

The new reign was not particularly popular. The barbarian origins of Zeno caused antipathy towards his regime among the people of Constantinople. Furthermore, the strong Germanic portion of the military, led by Theodoric Strabo, disliked the Isaurian officers that Leo I brought to reduce his dependency on the Ostrogoths. Finally, Zeno alienated his fellow Isaurian general Illus.

Basiliscus and Verina took advantage of the situation to form a conspiracy against their imperial in-law. In 475, a popular revolt against the emperor started within the capital. The uprising received military support from Theodoric Strabo, Illus, and Armatus, and succeeded in taking control of Constantinople. Verina convinced her son-in-law to leave the city. Zeno fled to his native lands, bringing with him some of the Isaurians living in Constantinople and the imperial treasury. Basiliscus was then acclaimed as Augustus on 9 January 475 at the Hebdomon palace, by the palace ministers and the Byzantine Senate. The mob of Constantinople got its revenge against Zeno, killing almost all of the Isaurians left in the city.

However, Basiliscus managed to estrange himself from most of his key collaborators. Patricius, the magister officiorum and lover of Verina, was executed to prevent her aspirations to elevate him to the throne. As a consequence, Verina later intrigued against Basiliscus because of her lover's execution. Theodoric and Armatus were promoted to magister militum and magister militum praesentialis and were vying for authority. Finally, the support of Illus was most likely wavering, given the massacre of the Isaurians allowed by Basiliscus.

In 476, both Illus and Armatus defected to the side of Zeno. In August, Zeno besieged Constantinople. The leader of the Pannonian Goths, Theodoric the Amal (later known as Theodoric the Great) had allied with Zeno. Theodoric would have attacked Basiliscus and his Thracian Goth foederati led by Theodoric Strabo, receiving, in exchange, the title of magister militum held by Strabo and the payments previously given to the Thracian Goths. It has been suggested that Constantinople was defenseless during Zeno's siege because the Magister Militum Strabo had moved north to counter this menace. The Senate opened the gates of the city to the Isaurian, allowing the deposed emperor to resume the throne. Ariadne was still empress.

In 479, Ariadne came into conflict with her husband over the fate of her mother. Verina had attempted to assassinate Illus and had become his prisoner. She had supported the revolt of her other son-in-law Marcian even during her captivity. Ariadne attempted to obtain her release, first from Zeno, and then from Illus, to whom the emperor referred her. Illus not only refused her request, but charged her with wishing to place another person on her husband's throne. This irritated her, and she, like her mother, attempted to assassinate Illus, a move which appeared to be supported by Zeno. Jordanes ascribes her hatred to another cause: he says that Illus had infused jealous suspicions into Zeno's mind which had led Zeno to attempt her life, and that her knowledge of these things drove her to revenge. The assassin whom she employed failed to kill Illus, but cut off his ear in the attempt. The assassin was taken, and Zeno, who appears to have been privy to the affair, was unable to prevent his execution.

The affair does not seem to have had long-term effects in their marriage. She remained married to Zeno until his death on 9 April 491.

== Empress of Anastasius I ==
The widowed Augusta was able to choose Zeno's successor for the throne and a second husband for herself in the person of Anastasius, a palace official (silentiarius), whom she preferred to Zeno's brother Longinus. Anastasius was proclaimed emperor on 11 April and they were married on 20 May. Anastasius was in his sixties at the time of their marriage and the couple were childless.

She died in Constantinople in 515 and was buried in the Church of the Holy Apostles. Anastasius was buried beside her in 518.

Royal titles
| Preceded by Verina | Byzantine Empress consort 474–475 | Succeeded by Zenonis |
| Preceded by Zenonis | Byzantine Empress consort 476–515 | Succeeded by Euphemia |
