= Dalisandus =

Dalisandus or Dalisandos (Ancient Greek: Δαλίσανδος/Δαλισανδός) may refer to two Ancient cities and bishoprics in Asia Minor (Asian Turkey), now both Latin Catholic titular sees :

- Dalisandus in Isauria
- Dalisandus in Pamphylia
- Dalisandus in Lycaonia
