= Sbida =

Town of ancient Cilicia

Coordinates: 36°42′49″N 32°47′51″E

Sbida or Sbide was a town of ancient Cilicia and in the later Roman province of Isauria, inhabited in Roman and Byzantine times. It became a bishopric; no longer the seat of a residential bishop, it remains a titular see of the Roman Catholic Church.

Its site is located near Yukarıçağlar, Asiatic Turkey.
