= Zenonis =

Eastern Roman empress from 475 to 476

- Augusta
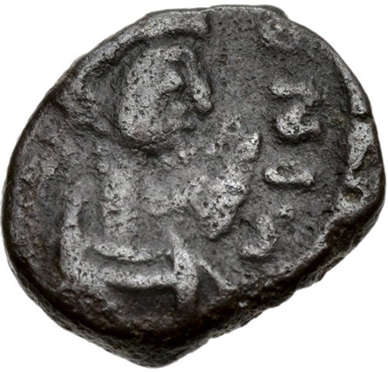
- Depiction of Aelia Zenonis on one of the coins minted by her husband Basiliscus

Empress of the Roman Empire
- Tenure: 475–476
- Born: 5th century
- Died: 476/477; Cappadocia (modern-day Turkey)
- Spouse: Basiliscus
- Issue: Marcus
Names
- Aelia Zenonis
Regnal name
- Aelia Zenonis Augusta
- Dynasty: House of Leo

Aelia Zenonis (Latin: Zenonis, Greek: Ζηνονίς, 476/477) was Eastern Roman empress as the wife of Basiliscus. Her ancestry is unknown.

== Empress ==
On 17 November 474, Leo II died and his father Zeno became sole emperor of the Eastern Roman Empire. The new reign was not particularly popular. Zeno was an Isaurian and therefore considered a barbarian. His origins caused antipathy towards his regime among the people of Constantinople. Zeno also secured positions of high authority for his fellow Isaurians. Furthermore, the strong Germanic portion of the military, led by Theodoric Strabo, disliked the Isaurian officers that Leo I brought to reduce his dependency on the Ostrogoths. Finally, Zeno alienated his fellow Isaurian general Illus.

Basiliscus and Verina took advantage of the situation to form a conspiracy against their imperial in-law. In 475, a popular revolt against the emperor started within the capital. The uprising, received military support by Theodoric Strabo, Illus and Armatus and succeeded in taking control of Constantinople. Verina convinced her son-in-law to leave the city. Zeno fled to his native lands, bringing with him some of the Isaurians living in Constantinople, and the imperial treasury. Basiliscus was then acclaimed as Augustus on 9 January 475.

Zenonis was declared an augusta immediately following the successful coup d'état. Marcus, eldest son of the new imperial couple, was declared first a caesar and afterwards an augustus, co-ruler of his father. Basiliscus and Zenonis favored Monophysitism by first restoring its chief proponents Pope Timothy II of Alexandria and Peter the Fuller, Patriarch of Antioch, to their respective thrones and secondly by persuasion of the former issued (9 April 475) a circular letter (Enkyklikon) to the bishops calling them to accept as valid only the first three ecumenical synods, and reject the Council of Chalcedon. All bishops were to sign the edict. While most of the Eastern bishops accepted the letter, Patriarch Acacius of Constantinople refused, with the support of the population of the city, clearly showing his disdain towards Basiliscus, by draping the icons in Hagia Sophia in black.

According to certain passages in the Suda, Zenonis had found a lover in Armatus, a nephew of her husband. J. B. Bury gives the passages as following:

Basiliscus permitted Armatus, inasmuch as he was a kinsman, to associate freely with the Empress Zenonis. Their intercourse became intimate, and as they were both persons of no ordinary beauty they became extravagantly enamoured of each other. They used to exchange glances of the eyes, they used constantly to turn their faces and smile at each other; and the passion which they were obliged to conceal was the cause of dule and teen. They confided their trouble to Daniel, an eunuch, and to Maria, a midwife, who hardly healed their malady by the remedy of bringing them together. Then Zenonis coaxed Basiliscus to grant her lover the highest office in the city.

The reference to the Augusta reportedly convinced her husband Basiliscus to appoint Armatus to the office of magister militum praesentialis. Armatus was also awarded the consulship of 476, together with Basiliscus.

== Deposition ==
Soon after his elevation, Basiliscus had despatched Illus and his brother Trocundus against Zeno, who, now in his native fortresses, had resumed the life of an Isaurian chieftain. Basiliscus, however, failed to fulfil the promises he made to the two generals; furthermore, they received letters from some of the leading ministers at the court, urging them to secure the return of Zeno, for the city now preferred a restored Isaurian to a Miaphysite whose unpopularity increased with the fiscal rapacity of his ministers.

During his operations in Isauria, Illus took Zeno's brother, Longinus, prisoner and kept him in an Isaurian fortress. Because he thought he would have great influence over a restored Zeno, he changed sides and marched with Zeno towards Constantinople in the summer of 476. When Basiliscus received news of this danger, he hastened to recall his ecclesiastical edicts and to conciliate the Patriarch and the people, but it was too late.

Armatus, as magister militum, was sent with all available forces in Asia Minor, to oppose the advancing army of the Isaurians, but secret messages from Zeno, who promised to give him the title of magister militum for life and to confer the rank of Caesar on his son, induced him to betray his master. Armatus avoided the road by which Zeno was advancing and marched into Isauria by another way. This betrayal decided the fate of Basiliscus.

In August 476, Zeno besieged Constantinople. The Senate opened the gates of the city to the Isaurian, allowing the deposed emperor to resume the throne. Basiliscus fled to sanctuary in a church, but he was betrayed by Acacius and surrendered himself and his family after extracting a solemn promise from Zeno not to shed their blood. Basiliscus, Zenonis, and his son Marcus were sent to a fortress in Cappadocia where Zeno had them enclosed in a dry cistern, to die from exposure.

== See also ==
- Women in ancient Rome

Royal titles
Preceded by Ariadne	Byzantine Empress consort 475–476	Succeeded by Ariadne
