= Neapolis (Thracian Chersonese) =

Greek city in ancient Thrace

Coordinates: 40°38′10″N 27°10′55″E

Neapolis (Ancient Greek: Νεάπολις) was a Greek city in ancient Thrace, located on the Propontis. It also bore the name Heraclea or Herakleia (Ἡράκλεια). It was a member of the Delian League and appears in Athenian tribute registers between 442/1 and 430/29 BCE.

Its site is located near modern Eriklice Köyü (Erikli) in Şarköy, Turkey

== See also ==
- Greek colonies in Thrace
