= Limnae (Cappadocia) =

Town of ancient Cappadocia

Coordinates: 38°14′22″N 34°41′39″E

Limnae or Limnai (Ancient Greek: Λίμναι) was a town in ancient Cappadocia, inhabited in Byzantine times. Limnae was the place of exile and death of Marcus, a Byzantine usurper.

Its site is located near Gölçük in Anatolia.
