= Ernst Stein =

Ernst Edward Aurel Stein (19 September 1891, in Jaworzno – 25 February 1945, in Fribourg) was an Austrian-Jewish Byzantinist and a historian of Late Antiquity.

Ernst was the son of Ernst Eduard Stein and Henrietta Rosalie (née Hein) and the nephew of the Hungarian-born British archaeologist Sir Aurel Stein. He married Johanna Brandeis in Vienna on 4 April 1923.

He studied classical philology and history at the University of Vienna (doctorate 1914), where his teachers included Ludo Moritz Hartmann, Eugen Bormann and Wilhelm Kubitschek. From 1919 he worked as a lecturer at the university, and in 1927 relocated to Frankfurt am Main as an employee of the Römisch-Germanische Kommission. In 1931 he was named an associate professor of Byzantine and ancient history at the University of Berlin, then afterwards, taught classes as a visiting professor in Brussels and at Catholic University in Washington D.C. In 1937 he was appointed professor of Byzantine history at the University of Leuven. For a period of time, he lived in France under an alias, and in 1942 moved to Geneva, where he taught classes up until his death in 1945.

== Selected works ==
- Studien zur Geschichte des Byzantinischen Reiches, vornehmlich unter den kaisern Justinus II u. Tiberius Constantinus, 1919 – Studies on the history of the Byzantine Empire, mainly involving the emperors Justin II and Tiberius Constantinus.
- Untersuchungen über das officium der prätorianerpräfektur seit Diokletian, 1922 – Investigations on the officium of the praetorian prefecture since Diocletian.
- Geschichte des spätromischenn Reiches, 1928 – History of the Late Roman Empire.
- Fasti des römischen Deutschland unter dem Prinzipat (as editor, with Emil Ritterling and Edmund Groag, 1932) – Fasti of Roman Germania under the Principate.
- Histoire du Bas-Empire (with Jean-Rémy Palanque; 2 volumes, 1949–59) – History of the Late Empire.
- Untersuchungen zur spätbyzantinischen Verfassungs- und Wirtschaftsgeschichte (preface by Jean-Rémy Palanque, 1962) – Studies on the Late Byzantine constitutional and economic history.
- Opera minora selecta (preface by Jean-Rémy Palanque, 1968).

He also made contributions to the multi-volume Inscriptiones trium Galliarum et Germaniarum latinae (primary author Otto Hirschfeld).
