= Armatus =

Byzantine military commander

Flavius Armatus
- Born: Unknown
- Died: 477
- Relatives: Uncle: Basiliscus; Son: Basiliscus; Aunt: Verina
- Military career
- Allegiance: Byzantine Empire
- Rank: Magister militum, consul

Flavius Armatus (died 477), also known as Harmatius, was an Eastern Roman military commander, magister militum under Emperors Leo I, Basiliscus and Zeno, and consul. He was instrumental in the rebellion of Basiliscus against Zeno, and in his subsequent fall.

== Origin and early career ==
Armatus was a nephew of Basiliscus and of Empress Verina, the wife of Leo I. It is known that Armatus had a son, also named Basiliscus. During the last part of Emperor Leo's reign, Armatus, as magister militum per Thracias, successfully quelled a revolt in Thrace, cutting off the hands of the Thracian prisoners and sending them to the rebels. It is possible that the rebels were men of the Thracian Goth Theodoric Strabo, a military commander under Leo, and hence this revolt would have been the one started by Strabo between the death of Aspar (471) and the end of Leo's rule (473).

== Rise of Basiliscus ==
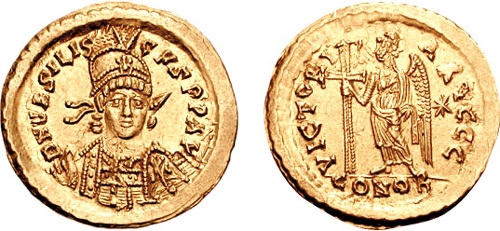
Solidus issued by Basiliscus during his short reign. Armatus supported his relative Basiliscus in his revolt against Emperor Zeno.

Armatus supported the rebellion of Basiliscus in 475, probably gaining also the support of Verina, who was the mother-in-law of deposed Emperor Zeno, for the rebels. During the short reign of Basiliscus, Armatus exercised noteworthy influence on both the emperor and his wife and Augusta Zenonis. There were rumours about a relationship between Armatus and Zenonis. Zenonis convinced Basiliscus to appoint Armatus to the office of magister militum praesentalis. Armatus was also awarded the consulship of 476, together with Basiliscus.

Armatus was a sort of dandy, who was interested only in his own hair and other body training, and Theodoric Strabo despised him for this reason. Strabo, therefore, grew unsatisfied with Basiliscus, whom he had helped in his uprising against Zeno, because he had given the title of magister militum praesentalis, a rank as high as Strabo's own, to such a man.

After the honours and wealth received by his uncle Basiliscus, Armatus thought of himself as the bravest of the men, dressing as Achilles and parading around his house near the Hippodrome. During his wandering, the people called him "Pyrrhus", either because he was of reddish complexion or because they were teasing him.

== Fall of Basiliscus and Armatus's death ==
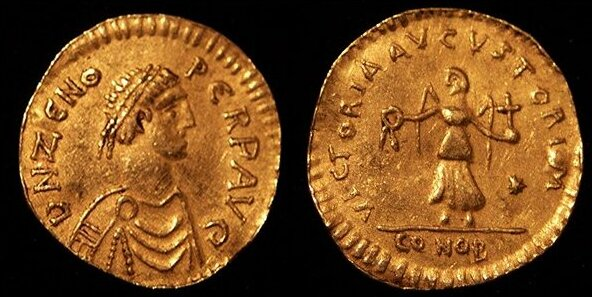
Tremissis issued by Emperor Zeno after he had regained his throne. Armatus was the commander of the army sent by Basiliscus to counter Zeno's advance, but accepted a bribe by the former emperor and betrayed his uncle.

In the summer of 476, Zeno moved from Isauria to regain his throne, and bribed both of Basiliscus's generals Illus and Trocondus to join him. Basiliscus gathered all of the troops from Thracia, the city of Constantinople and even the palace guard, and, after binding Armatus with a loyalty oath, sent them to meet and defeat Zeno. When Armatus met Zeno, however, he was bribed into joining the Isaurian emperor, who promised him the title of magister militum praesentalis for life, his son, Basiliscus, the title of caesar, and the qualification as heir to Zeno.

After his restoration, Zeno fulfilled his promises, letting Armatus keep his title of magister militum praesentalis (possibly even raising him to the rank of Patricius) and appointing his son Basiliscus Caesar in Nicaea. In 477, however, Zeno changed his mind, according to Evagrius by the instigation of Illus, an Isaurian general who had helped Basiliscus's rise and later changed sides to Zeno, and who would have gained by the fall of Armatus. Armatus was killed, on Zeno's orders, by Armatus's own friend Onoulphus, who, as a poor barbarian, had been welcomed by Armatus, then made comes, then commander of Illyricum; Armatus even lent him a great deal of money to pay for a banquet. The citizens of Constantinople rejoiced after his death. Zeno confiscated all of the properties of Armatus, deposed his son Basiliscus, and had him ordained priest.

== Relationship between Armatus and Odoacer ==
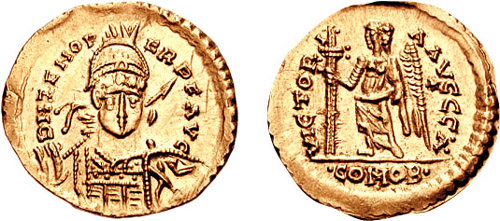
Coin issued by Odoacer in the name of Zeno

A 1986 publication by Stephan Krautschick opened the study of Armatus's life to new interpretations, in particular the relationship between Armatus and Basiliscus's family and Odoacer, chieftain of the Heruli and later King of Italy. Krautschick's assertion, which has been adopted by subsequent scholars, was that Armatus was the brother of Onoulphus and Odoacer, so that the leader of the Heruli was also nephew of Basiliscus and Verina. In particular, this interpretation sheds light on why Armatus was so keen to help Onoulphus, and that it was his own brother that killed him.

The link between Armatus, Odoacer and Onoulphus is based on a fragment by John of Antioch, in which Onoulphus is stated to be the murderer and the brother of Armatus. Before the work of Krautschick, and also according to other scholars, the reading was emended to read that "Odoacer was the brother of the Onoulphus who killed Armatus". This amendment made the fragment of John compatible with the accounts of other historians, since neither John Malalas nor Malchus make any reference to the fact that Armatus was killed by his own brother, and no reference is made to a blood relationship between Odoacer and Basiliscus.

== Notes ==
Preceded by Imp. Caesar Flavius Zeno Augustus II, Post consulatum Leonis Augusti (East)	Consul of the Roman Empire; 476 with Imp. Caesar Flavius Basiliscus Augustus II	Succeeded by Post consulatum Basilisci Augusti II et Armati (next Illus)
