= John Malalas =

Byzantine chronicler (c. AD 491 – 578)

John Malalas (/ˈmælələs/; Ancient Greek: Ἰωάννης Μαλάλας, romanized: Iōánnēs Malálas; c. 491 – 578) was a Byzantine chronicler from Antioch in Asia Minor.

== Life ==
Of Syrian descent, Malalas was a native speaker of Syriac who learned how to write in Greek later in his life. The name Malalas is probably derived from the Syriac word ܡܰܠܳܠܰܐ malolo 'rhetor, orator'; it is first applied to him by John of Damascus. The alternative form Malelas is later, first appearing in Constantine VII.

Malalas was educated in Antioch, and was probably a jurist there, but moved to Constantinople at some point in Justinian I's reign (perhaps after the sack of Antioch by the Sasanian Empire in 540); all we know of his travels from his own hand are visits to Thessalonica and Paneas.

== Writing ==
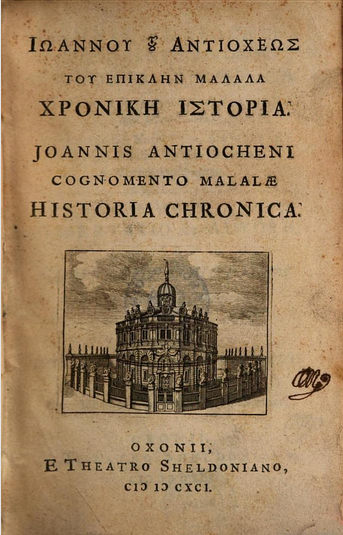
The title page of Historia Chronica, 1691, from the Austrian National Library

He wrote a Chronographia (Χρονογραφία) in 18 books, the beginning and the end of which are lost. In its present state it begins with the mythical history of Egypt and ends with the expedition to Roman Africa under the tribune Marcianus, Justinian's nephew, in 563 (his editor Thurn believing it originally to end with Justinian's death); it is focused largely on Antioch and (in the later books) Constantinople. Except for the history of Justinian and his immediate predecessors, it possesses little historical value; the author, "relying on Eusebius of Caesarea and other compilers, confidently strung together myths, biblical stories, and real history." The eighteenth book, dealing with Justinian's reign, is well acquainted with, and colored by, official propaganda. The writer is a supporter of Church and State, an upholder of monarchical principles. However, the theory identifying him with the patriarch John Scholasticus is almost certainly incorrect.

Malalas cites many sources, including the lost or fragmentary works of Brunichius, Charax of Pergamum, Domninus, Eustathius of Epiphania, Eutropius, Eutychianus, Nestorianus, Philostratus, Priscus, Sisyphus of Kos and Timotheus.

The work is important as the first surviving example of a chronicle written not for the learned but for the instruction of the monks and the common people, and its language shows a compromise with the spoken language of the day, although "it is still very much a written style. In particular, he employs technical terminology and bureaucratic clichés incessantly, and, in a period of transition from Latin to Greek governmental terminology, still uses the Latin loanwords alongside their Greek replacements ... The overall impression created by Malalas' style is one of simplicity, reflecting a desire for the straightforward communication of information in the written language of everyday business as it had evolved under the influence of spoken Greek."

It obtained great popularity, and was used by various writers until the ninth century; it was translated into Old Bulgarian probably in the tenth century, and parts of it were used for the Primary Chronicle. It is preserved in an abridged form in a single manuscript now at Oxford (Baroccianus 182) as well as in various fragments. A medieval translation in Georgian also exists.

== See also ==
- Philokalia
- Hesychasm

== Modern editions ==
Text

- Johannes Thurn (ed.) 2000, Ioannis Malalae Chronographia, Corpus Fontium Historiae Byzantinae (CFHB) 35 (Berlin, New York: Walter de Gruyter) ISBN 3-11-008800-2

Translation

- Elizabeth Jeffreys, Michael Jeffreys, Roger Scott et al. 1986, The Chronicle of John Malalas: A Translation, Byzantina Australiensia 4 (Melbourne: Australian Association for Byzantine Studies) ISBN 0-9593626-2-2
- Downey, G., ed. (1940). Chronicle of John Malalas, books VIII—XVIII. University of Chicago Press.
