= Caelius =

The name Caelius (sometimes spelled Coelius) is an ancient Roman nomen and may refer to:

- Caelius Vibenna (8th century BC), a noble Etruscan
- Gaius Coelius Caldus or Caelius (2nd–1st century BC), a consul of the Roman Republic
- Marcus Caelius Rufus (1st century BC), an orator and politician in the late Roman Republic
- Marcus Caelius (45 BC–9 AD), a senior centurion of the Imperial Roman army
- Marcus Roscius Caelius (1st century AD), a Roman military officer
- Balbinus or Decimus Caelius Calvinus Balbinus (178–238), Roman Emperor
- Lactantius or Lucius Caecilius Firmianus Lactantius (250–325), an early Christian author
- Caelius Aconius Probianus (fl. 461-471), a politician of the Western Roman Empire
- Caelius Sedulius (5th century AD), a Christian poet
- Caelius Aurelianus (5th century AD), a Roman physician and writer
- Caelius Rhodiginus (1469–1525), a Venetian writer and professor
- Caelius Calcagninus (1479-1541), an Italian humanist and scientist
- Caelius Secundus Curio (1503–1569), an Italian humanist, editor and historian

== Political ==
- Caelius, a codename used in letters between Cicero and Atticus, concerning a plot in the Roman Civil War

== Other uses ==
- Collis Caelius, one of the Seven Hills of Rome, Italy
- Caelius (beetle), a genus of scarab beetles in the subfamily Aegialiinae

== See also ==
- Caelia gens, a plebeian family at Rome
