= Pamprepius =

Byzantine philosopher and poet

Pamprepius (Ancient Greek: Παμπρέπιος, Pamprépios; Latin: Pamprepius; 29 September 440 – November 484) was a philosopher and a pagan poet who rebelled against the Eastern Roman Emperor Zeno.

Damascius described him as a brilliant poet, Malchus as an acute politician, but ugly, arrogant, unscrupulous and treacherous. Rhetorius, an Egyptian astrologer, called him a charlatan and a libertine. He has been compared to Claudian, as both these poets enjoyed eight years of political power at the side of usurpers. He is considered the last Roman pagan poet.

His life is known with unusual precision, as his horoscope calculated by Rhetorius in the early sixth century has been found.

== Biography ==
=== Education ===
Pamprepius was born in Egypt, at Panopolis, near Thebes, on 29 September 440; the discovery of a horoscope, which has been identified with that of Pamprepius, let us know that he was born at 15:48. He was ugly, but he had considerable intellectual qualities. He devoted himself to literature, especially to poetry; probably he belonged to the school of Nonnus of Panopolis, a native of his own city. He became very famous as a poet in his country. At the age of 33 years, in 473, he moved to Greece, where he spent much time in Athens, marrying a rich woman and becoming a professor of grammar (philology). At the same time he studied philosophy under the neo-Platonic philosopher Proclus, who had, among his students, the Roman general Marcellinus, the Western Roman Emperor Anthemius, and the consuls Illustrius Pusaeus and Messius Phoebus Severus.

In Athens he had found a patron in Theagenes, an important citizen of Athens, possibly a magistrate, who was also a supporter of Proclus. In his honour Pamprepius composed a poem. However, Pamprepius later came into conflict with Theagenes, even suffering physical damages, which Theagenes investigated in a case held against Pamprepius. It is possible that the reason for this attack was linked to his ambition to become the most famous of all philosophers but Proclus. Because of his clash with Theagenes, he was obliged to leave Athens in haste.

=== Collaborator of Illus ===
From Athens he went to Constantinople, where he arrived in May 476 (at the age of 35 years 8 months). Here he introduced himself as a magician or an initiator and achieved fame thanks to his culture and his professional skills. An officer called Marsus introduced him to the powerful Illus, the magister militum of the emperor Zeno; all three of these men were Isaurians. Pamprepius earned Illus' favour reading out a speech on the soul; Illus used his own influence to have Pamprepius appointed professor, defraying the cost of his public salary with his personal funds, and sending him a number of students.

Pamprepius' close relationship with and influence over Illus again inspired the envy of many. His reputation suffered from his practice of paganism and divination in the heavily Christian city of Constantinople. Among his enemies were emperor Zeno and the Dowager Empress Verina (wife of Zeno's father-in-law and predecessor). Once, while Illus was travelling to his native Isauria, Pamprepius was sentenced to exile by the Emperor on charges of attempting to use his divination skills in favour of Illus and against Zeno; he was therefore sent to Pergamum. Illus, who was well aware that his own friendship had led to the poet's exile, welcomed Pamprepius at his own home and, on his return to the capital, brought Pamprepius back with him. Illus had Pamprepius appointed senator, honorary consul, quaestor sacri palatii and, after some time, patricius, a most prestigious position.

In 479 Marcian, son of the late Western Emperor Anthemius and brother-in-law of Zeno, revolted and laid siege to the Eastern Emperor in Constantinople. Initially, Illus lost heart, but Pamprepius declared that providence was on their side, and when Illus captured the rebels, Pamprepius gained a reputation for clairvoyance. Since then, Illus always kept Pamprepius close to him and consulted him frequently. The two spent the winter of 479/480 at Nicaea, as Pamprepius was unpopular in Constantinople.

=== Revolt against Zeno ===
In late 481 or early 482, Pamprepius went to Egypt, meeting representatives of the pagan community at Alexandria. He tried to persuade them to help him in a revolt against Zeno, showing them oracles and prophecies that foretold the imminent collapse of Christianity; however, he did not gain their support. He also took part in the disputes between the various Christian sects, supporting the patriarchal candidacy of the Chalcedonian John Talaia against the Miaphysite Peter Mongus, but again he was unsuccessful.

The power plays at court—involving Zeno, Verina, Illus and Ariadne, daughter of Verina and wife of Zeno—degenerated into a riot, in which Illus was the target of two assassination attempts by Verina and Ariadne. In 484, as he had been appointed magister militum per Orientem, Illus decided to withdraw from the court and move with Pamprepius to Nicaea, where he assumed office and recuperated from a wound suffered in the second assassination attempt.

While there, however, Illus started a rebellion against Zeno, elevating to the throne Leontius, a Syrian officer, and appointing Pamprepius as his magister officiorum. After some initial victories, Illus' troops were defeated by the army of Zeno and forced to take refuge in the fortress of Papurius, in Isauria. Illus discovered that Pamprepius wanted to betray his fellows to save himself, and in November 484 put him to death and had his head thrown over the battlements of the fortress. According to some modern scholars, Pamprepius did not want to betray his patron, but the failure of his political schemes was interpreted as deception by Illus' men.

Some scholars have suggested that Pamprepius' participation is a clue that the revolt of Illus was somehow an attempt to restore paganism, but this hypothesis has not been successful among scholars. However, it is known that the rebels sought the support of the pagan community of Alexandria: in fact, they were persecuted because they were suspected of being part of Illus' rebellion. A pagan convert to Christianity called Paralius wrote a letter to his former co-religionists, in which he remembers how they had prayed and sacrificed for the success of the revolt of Illus and Pamprepius against Zeno and how they had received many oracles foretelling the victory of the heathens, but how in the end Christianity had prevailed.

== Works ==
Pamprepius composed two works, now lost:

- Ἰσαυρικά, Isaurica: an epic poem about Isauria, the region in Asia Minor that was the country of origin of both Illus and Zeno. It either celebrated Zeno's restoration against Basiliscus in 476, or it was a celebration of Illus;
- Ἐτυμολογιῶν ἀπόδοσις, Etymologiarum expositio, prose

Some fragments have been attributed to Pamprepius, among them a panegyric to Theagenes and a lamentation on leaving Athens.

== Bibliography ==
Pamprepius' life is known through Suda, which collects under his article three or four narrations not completely coherent among themselves:

- "Παμπρέπιος", Suda, and

Other information is contained in the summaries of the Historia of Candidus and in the Vita Isidori of Damascius contained in the Bibliotheca di Photius:

- Photius, Bibliotheca, codices 79 and 242.

Modern essays on Pamprepius are:

- Bury, John Bagnell, A History of the Later Roman Empire from Arcadius to Irene (395 A.D. -800 A.D.), Adamant Media Corporation, 2005, ISBN 1-4021-8369-0, p. 258.
- Fichera, Regina, "Divining to Gain (or Lose) the Favour of Usurpers: the Case of Pamprepius of Panopolis (440-484)", Gaining and Losing Imperial Favour in Late Antiquity, Brill, 2020, ISBN 978-90-04-40769-5, pp. 219-240.
- Grillmeier, Alois, e Theresia Hainthaler, Christ in Christian Tradition, Westminster John Knox Press, 1996, ISBN 0-664-22300-1, pp. 91–92.
- Nagy, Gregory, Greek Literature, Routledge, 2001, ISBN 0-415-93770-1, pp. 473, 481.
- Smith, William, "Illus", Dictionary of Greek and Roman Biography and Mythology, Volume 2, p. 570; "Pamprepius", ibidem, Volume 3, pp. 104-105.
