= Candidus Isaurus =

Byzantine historian

Candidus Isaurus (Note: Greek: Κάνδιδος ὁ Ἴσαυρος, romanized: Kandidos ho Isauros. His name is sometimes anglicized Candidus of Isauria or Candidus the Isaurian.) (fl. 491) was an Eastern Roman historian. His work, written in Greek, is known only from fragments.

== Life ==
Candidus was probably born in the 430s, since he seems to have been an adult early in the reign of Leo I. He claimed to be a native of Isauria Tracheia and was a Chalcedonian Christian. In his work, Candidus claimed to have served as the "secretary (hypographeus) to the most powerful among the Isaurians", by which he probably meant the emperor Zeno and the other Isaurian generals. This suggests that he lived in Constantinople for at least part of the period 474–491. He was possibly an eyewitness to many of the events he recorded. While the term hypographeus could mean imperial notary, Candidus probably means private secretary.

Candidus wrote his history between the death of Zeno in 491 and Anastasius I's purging of the Isaurians from the army in 492. The date of his death is unknown.

== Work ==
Candidus' history, divided into three books, covered the period 457–491, from the start of the reign of Leo I through to the death of Zeno. Its focus was on events in the Eastern Roman Empire. His history was still available in the 9th century, for it was reviewed by Photius in his Bibliotheca, who also provides a synopsis. This can be partially supplemented by a few passages in the Suda, a 10th-century Greek encyclopedia.

At most, less the one tenth of Candidus' history survives. One article in the Suda is cited to Candidus, but several anonymous articles are probably also taken from his work. Warren Treadgold tentatively assigns him five.

=== Synopsis ===
Book 1, covering eighteen years, began with the installation of Leo as emperor by Aspar in 457. It described the great fire of 464, which destroyed the Palace of Lausus; Basiliscus' expedition against the Vandals in 468, including an account of its expenses; and the quarrel of Leo and Aspar, which led Leo to ally with Zeno and the Isaurians and have Aspar and his son Ardabur assassinated. It ended with the succession crisis that followed Leo's death. According to Candidus, Leo wanted to leave the empire to Zeno, but the latter was so unpopular that he instead left it to his son, Leo II. Nevertheless, when Leo II acceded, he made Zeno co-emperor. At this point, Candidus digressed to give an account of the origin of the Isaurians, with a proof of their descent from Esau. The first book ended with the usurpations of Basiliscus in the East and Romulus Augustulus in the West in 475.

Book 2, covering nine years, began with an account of Zeno's exile, the reign of Basiliscus and Zeno's return in 476. It described the great fire that destroyed many houses and the imperial courthouse called the Basilica or Imperial Stoa during the reign of Basiliscus, leading to the loss of 120,000 books. After the deposition of Romulus Augustulus by Odovacar in 476, it covered Zeno's second and sole reign down to 484. It also related a schism among the Christians of Antioch in the same period, when the monophysite bishop Peter the Fuller was deposed in favour of the Chalcedonian Julian.

Book 3, covering seven years, began with the rebellion of the Isaurian Illus in 484 and ended. This dominated the history until Illus' execution in 488. The rest of the work covered the remainder of Zeno's reign down to his death in 491. Photius does not give a detailed description of the last part of the work, but it is clear that Candidus got more detailed as he neared the time of writing. His surviving fragments and citations are most useful as a source for the reign of Zeno.

=== Analysis ===
Zeno is the hero of the work, and Candidus shows strong partiality for the Isaurian soldiers employed by Leo and Zeno. His inclusion of ecclesiastical history in an otherwise secular account is unusual, but is probably explained by his need to contextualize Zeno's Chalcedonianism. Candidus' history can be contrasted with the lost work of his contemporary, Malchus of Philadelphia, which was critical of Leo, Zeno and the Isaurians. Malchus probably completed his work after Candidus had completed his and as a direct rejoinder to the shorter work of his rival.

While complimentary of Candidus' defence of the Council of Chalcedon, Photius was critical of Candidus' style and his use of disparate source materials. By criticizing his sentence construction and choice of words, he intimates that his literary education was deficient. It appears, however, that Candidus, like most other secular historians of his day, imitated the Atticism of the Second Sophistic. In comparison to Malchus, he has been described as "romantic".

The historian John of Antioch may have made use of Candidus, but does not mention him. His sympathetic and detailed account of the rebellion of Illus is hypothesized to have been derived at least in part from Candidus. Despite the loss of most of his text, Candidus is still "a primary source of foremost importance for the whole story of the Isaurian ascendancy under Leo and Zeno."

== Editions ==
- Müller, K. W. L., ed. (1851). "Candidus Isaurus". Fragmenta Historicorum Graecorum. Vol. IV. pp. 135–137. Greek text with Latin translation.
- Blockley, R. C. (1983). "Candidus: Fragments". The Fragmentary Classicising Historians of the Later Roman Empire: Eunapius, Olympiodorus, Priscus and Malchus. Vol. 2: Text, Translation and Historiographical Notes. Francis Cairns. pp. 465–471 (text), 472–473 (notes). Greek text with English translation.

== Bibliography ==
- Baldwin, B. (1991). "Kandidos". In Kazhdan, Alexander (ed.). The Oxford Dictionary of Byzantium. Oxford and New York: Oxford University Press. pp. 1100–1101. ISBN 0-19-504652-8.
- Blockley, R. C. (1981). The Fragmentary Classicising Historians of the Later Roman Empire: Eunapius, Olympiodorus, Priscus and Malchus. Vol. 1. Francis Cairns.
- Burgess, W. D. (1998). "Kandidos Isauros and His Sources". Byzantine Studies / Études Byzantines. New series. 3: 65–73.
- De Cicco, P. (2018). "Fictive Past and Modern Propaganda: The Reversal of Candidus' Biblical Archaiologia in the Age of the Anastasius". Revue belge de Philologie et d'Histoire. 96 (3): 995–1010.
- Gordon, C. D. (1960). The Age of Attila: Fifth-Century Byzantium and the Barbarians. University of Michigan Press.
- Martindale, John R., ed. (1980). The Prosopography of the Later Roman Empire: Volume II, AD 395–527. Cambridge: Cambridge University Press. ISBN 0-521-20159-4.
- Nicholson, O. P. (2018). "Candidus the Isaurian". In Nicholson, Oliver (ed.). The Oxford Dictionary of Late Antiquity, Volume 1: A–I. Oxford: Oxford University Press. p. 286. ISBN 978-0-19-881624-9.
- Treadgold, W. (2007). The Early Byzantine Historians. Palgrave Macmillan.
