= Flavius Appalius Illus Trocundes =

Roman general and rebel

Flavius Appalius Illus Trocundes (Greek: Τρόκονδος, died 485) was a general of the Eastern Roman Empire, involved in the rise and fall of Emperor Basiliscus and the rebellion against Emperor Zeno.

Trocundes was the brother of Illus, another Roman general. Both of them were from the region of Isauria.

== Biography ==
=== Support and betrayal of Basiliscus ===
In 475, the Eastern Roman Emperor Zeno, successor of Emperor Leo I, was deposed by Basiliscus, the brother of Leo's widow Verina. Zeno, expelled from Constantinople, fled to the mountains of Isauria, his home country. Basiliscus sent to chase him two of his generals, the brothers Trocundes and Illus, who were both of Isaurian origin. They defeated the ex-Emperor in July 476, and blocked him on a hill called "Constantinople" by local populations.

While Illus and Trocundes besieged Zeno, Basiliscus was losing the support of the aristocracy and the Church in the capital because of his religious position; he also lost Illus and Trocundes' support, as he allowed the population of the capital to massacre all Isaurian who had not left the city with Zeno. Illus and Trocundes were secretly instigated by the Senate of Constantinople to betray Basiliscus. Since they had captured Zeno's brother, Longinus, they thought they could control Zeno.

The two generals therefore had every reason to accept the promises and gifts of their fellow Isaurian. They decided to betray Basiliscus and march together on Constantinople, where Basiliscus was deposed (476) and later killed.

=== Rebellion against Zeno ===
During the reign of Zeno, the two brothers received many honours. Trocundes was consul in 482, his brother was consul and Patricius. However, because of the hostility of Verina, the relationship between the Emperor and the two generals deteriorated. Illus and Trocundes left Constantinople for Asia Minor. Here, in 483 or 484, they revolted against Zeno and proclaimed Leontius emperor, a Syrian and an officer of high reputation.

The rebels were defeated by the army of Zeno, composed of Romans and Ostrogoths led by Theodoric the Amal and John the Scythian (then a consul), near Antioch. Leontius, Illus and Trocundes were forced to take refuge in the fortress of Papurius, where they were besieged. Trocundes tried to escape the blockade, in order to raise an army, but was captured and killed. Leontius and Illus, ignorant of Trocundes' fate, waited in Papurius for almost four years, but then were betrayed by the brother-in-law of Trocundes, who had been sent from Constantinople to that end, captured and beheaded (488).

== Bibliography ==
- Mirosław Jerzy Leszka, "The Career of Flavius Appalius Illus Trocundes", Byzantinoslavica 71.1-2 (2013): 47–58.
- William Smith, "Illus", Dictionary of Greek and Roman Biography and Mythology, Volume 2, pp. 569–570
- Stephen Williams and Gerard Friell, The Rome that did not fall, Routledge, 1999. ISBN 0-415-15403-0

Preceded by Rufius Achilius Maecius Placidus	Roman consul 482 with Severinus	Succeeded by Anicius Acilius Aginantius Faustus
