= Théogène =

Théogène or Theogene is a masculine given name which may refer to:

- Théogène François Page (1807–1867), French Navy vice admiral, Commissioner of Tahiti, Governor of Tourane (Da Nang) in Vietnam and Governor of Cochinchina in Saigon
- Théogène Ricard (1909–2006), Canadian politician
- Theogene Rudasingwa (born 1960), Rwandan politician
- Théogène Turatsinze (c. 1970–2012), Rwandan businessman and murder victim

== See also ==
- Theagenes, a list of men with the given name Theagenes or Theogenes
