= Messius Phoebus Severus =

Roman philosopher and politician

Messius Phoebus Severus (floruit 469–470) was a Roman politician and philosopher. He was appointed consul with Flavius Iordanes for 470.

== Biography ==
Born in Rome, he studied at the school of the neoplatonist philosopher Proclus, in Alexandria; among the other students there were the Pagan poet Pamprepius (who was instrumental in the revolt of Illus), the military officer Marcellinus (later semi-autonomous commander in Illyricum), the noble Anthemius (Consul and Western Roman Emperor), and Illustrius Pusaeus (Praetorian prefect of the East in 465 and Consul in 467). During this period, a pause in his career after he had become disillusioned with public life, he received some scholars who were interested in his rich library.

In 467/469 Severus returned to Rome, where the Western Emperor Anthemius elevated him to the honour of the consulate in the year 470, as well as gave him the rank of Patricius and the office of Praefectus urbi. According to Damascius, Severus and Anthemius had a secret plan to restore the Pagan cults. During his office, he restored parts of the Colosseum.

== Bibliography ==
- MacGeorge, Penny, Late Roman Warlords, Oxford University Press, 2002, ISBN 0-19-925244-0
- Martindale, John R., ed. (1980). "Fl. Messius Phoebus Severus 19". The Prosopography of the Later Roman Empire: Volume II, AD 395–527. Cambridge: Cambridge University Press. pp. 1005–1006. ISBN 0-521-20159-4.
- O'Meara, Dominic, Platonopolis: Platonic Political Philosophy in Late Antiquity, Oxford University Press, 2003, ISBN 0-19-925758-2

Political offices
| Preceded by Fl. Zeno, Fl. Marcian | Consul of the Roman Empire; 470 with Flavius Iordanes | Succeeded by Imp. Caes. Fl. Valerius Leo Augustus IV, Caelius Aconius Probianus |
