= Silluvia gogona =

Scientific classification
- Domain: Eukaryota
- Kingdom: Animalia
- Phylum: Arthropoda
- Class: Insecta
- Order: Coleoptera
- Suborder: Polyphaga
- Infraorder: Scarabaeiformia
- Family: Scarabaeidae
- Genus: Silluvia
- Species: S. gogona

Binomial name
- Silluvia gogona (Stebnicka, 1977)

Species of beetle

Silluvia gogona is a species of beetle in family Scarabaeidae.
