= Iordanes (consul) =

Roman army officer and politician

Flavius Iordanes was a Roman general and politician. He was holding the office of magister militum per Orientem when the Western Emperor Anthemius appointed him consul with Messius Phoebus Severus for 470.

Political offices
Preceded by Zeno; Marcianus	Roman consul 470 with Messius Phoebus Severus	Succeeded by Leo Augustus IV; Caelius Aconius Probianus
