= Sapriniana victoriae =

Scientific classification
- Kingdom: Animalia
- Phylum: Arthropoda
- Clade: Pancrustacea
- Class: Insecta
- Order: Coleoptera
- Suborder: Polyphaga
- Infraorder: Scarabaeiformia
- Family: Scarabaeidae
- Genus: Sapriniana
- Species: S. victoriae

Binomial name
- Sapriniana victoriae (Stebnicka & Howden, 1995)

Synonyms
- Saprus victoriae Stebnicka & Howden, 1995

Species of beetle

Sapriniana victoriae is a species of beetle of the family Scarabaeidae. It is found in Australia (Victoria).

== Description ==
Adults reach a length of about 3.5–4 mm (0.14–0.16 in). They have a shining, dark castaneous body.
