= Constantinian Excerpts =

53 volume Greek anthology

A page from the Codex Peirescianus

The Constantinian Excerpts (Note: Latin: Excerpta Constantiniana, Excerpta Historica or simply Excerpta; Greek: ᾽Εκλογαί, Eklogai, eclogues.) was a 53-volume Greek anthology of excerpts from at least 25 historians. It was commissioned by the Byzantine emperor Constantine VII (945–959), but probably not completed until after his death. Today only four volumes survive in various states of completeness. The titles of 21 other volumes are known. The volumes are typically known by their Latin titles. The title of the whole, Excerpts, is also conventional.

== Structure and purpose ==
The original work may not have been truly a selection of excerpts so much as an anthology of whole texts rearranged thematically. According to the preface, the project involved taking the works of selected historians and rearranging their passages by topic rather than chronology so that "nothing contained in the texts would escape this distribution into subjects; by this division according to the content nothing of the continuous narration is omitted, but rather it is preserved entire." Nonetheless, there is evidence of abridgement. There is also commentary.

The purpose of the Excerpts was as a sort of mirror for princes. Since history was believed to contain useful lessons for rulers, it was considered advantageous to arrange history thematically so that, in the words of Leonora Neville, "if an emperor was concerned with an upcoming embassy, he could read all the examples of embassies in Roman history at one time."

== Historians included ==
The earliest historian included in the Excerpts is Herodotus (5th century BC) and the latest George Hamartolos (9th century AD). There is some material preserved in the surviving Excerpts that is not preserved anywhere else, including selections from Polybius, Nicolaus of Damascus, Dexippus, Eunapius, Priscus, Peter the Patrician, Menander Protector and John of Antioch. Other historians included were Thucydides, Xenophon, Diodorus of Sicily, Dionysius of Halicarnassus, Josephus, Arrian of Nicomedia, Iamblichus, Appian of Alexandria, Cassius Dio, Socrates of Constantinople, Theodoret of Cyrrhus, Sozomen, Philostorgius, Zosimus, Procopius, Agathias of Myrina, Theophylact Simocatta, John Malalas and Malchus of Philadelphia. The ordering of authors within volumes follows no obvious rationale. An author's excerpts within a volume, however, are never presented out of order.

== Surviving text ==
The four surviving volumes are:

- Excerpta de legationibus, which is divided into two parts: Excerpta de legationibus gentium ad Romanos (On embassies to Rome) and the Excerpta de legationibus Romanorum ad gentes (On embassies from Rome). The original volume, kept in the Escorial, was lost to fire in 1671, but not before several copies had been made.
- Excerpta de insidiis (On ambushes), known from two 16th-century copies: Escorial Ω.I.11 and Bibliothèque nationale de France, Graecus 1666.
- Excerpta de virtutibus et vitiis (On virtues and vices) survives in the original 10th-century imperial manuscript, the Codex Peirescianus (Turonensis 980).
- Excerpta de sententiis (On gnomic statements) survives in the original 10th-century imperial manuscript (now Vatican Library, Graecus 73), but only as the undertext of a palimpsest, having been earsed and overwritten in the 14th century.

Other evidence for the Excerpts comes from the Suda encyclopedia. The compilers of the Suda made use of the Excerpts more often than the original works.

Fulvio Orsini prepared the first edition of any of the Excerpta, focussing mainly on Polybius, printed at Antwerp in 1582.

== Editions ==
- Excerpta historica iussu imperatoris Constantini Porphyrogeniti confecta, ed. Ursul Boissevain, Carl de Boor, Theodor Büttner-Wobst, and Antoon Gerard Roos, 4 vols. in 6 parts. Berlin: Weidmann, 1903–1910.
  - Volumen I. Excerpta de legationibus. Pars I. Excerpta de legationibus Romanorum ad gentes. Ed. Carolus de Boor. 1903.
  - Volumen I. Excerpta de legationibus. Pars II. Excerpta de legationibus gentium ad Romanos. Ed. Carolus de Boor. 1903.
  - Volumen II. Excerpta de virtutibus et vitiis. Pars I. Rec. et praefatus est Theodorus Büttner-Wobst; editionem curavit Antonius Gerardus Roos. 1906.
  - Volumen II. Excerpta de virtutibus et vitiis. Pars II. Rec. Antonius Gerardus Roos usus collatione codicis Peiresciani a Theodoro Büttner-Wobst confecta. 1910.
  - Volumen III. Excerpta de insidiis. Ed. Carolus de Boor. 1905.
  - Volumen IV. Excerpta de sententiis. Ed. Ursulus Philippus Boissevain. 1906.

== Bibliography ==
- Banchich, Thomas M. (2012). "Constantinian Excerpts". The Encyclopedia of Ancient History. Blackwell. doi:10.1002/9781444338386.wbeah08041.
- Banchich, Thomas M. (2015). The Lost History of Peter the Patrician: An Account of Rome's Imperial Past from the Age of Justinian. Routledge.
- Humphreys, Mike (2018). "Excerpta". In Oliver Nicholson (ed.). The Oxford Dictionary of Late Antiquity, Volume 1: A–I. Vol. 1. Oxford University Press. p. 574.
- Kazhdan, Alexander (1991). "Excerpta". In Alexander Kazhdan (ed.). The Oxford Dictionary of Byzantium. Oxford University Press. pp. 767–768.
- Manafis, Panagiotis (2017). "The Excerpta Anonymi and the Constantinian Excerpts". Byzantinoslavica. 75 (1–2): 250–264. CEEOL 608919
- Németh, András (2018). The Excerpta Constantiniana and the Byzantine Appropriation of the Past. Cambridge University Press.
- Neville, Leonora (2018). Guide to Byzantine Historical Writing. Cambridge University Press. doi:10.1017/9781139626880.
