= Sapriniana =

Scientific classification
- Kingdom: Animalia
- Phylum: Arthropoda
- Clade: Pancrustacea
- Class: Insecta
- Order: Coleoptera
- Suborder: Polyphaga
- Infraorder: Scarabaeiformia
- Family: Scarabaeidae
- Subfamily: Aegialiinae
- Tribe: Saprinianini
- Genus: Sapriniana; Strand, 1916

Synonyms
- Saprus Blackburn, 1904 (preoccupied Saprus Gistel, 1856)

Genus of beetles

Sapriniana is a genus of beetles belonging to the family Aegialiidae. The species of this genus are found in Australia.

Species:

- Sapriniana griffithi (Blackburn, 1904)
- Sapriniana lawrencei (Stebnicka & Howden, 1995)
- Sapriniana victoriae (Stebnicka & Howden, 1995)
- Sapriniana weiri (Stebnicka & Howden, 1995)
