= Psammoporus latipunctus =

Scientific classification
- Kingdom: Animalia
- Phylum: Arthropoda
- Clade: Pancrustacea
- Class: Insecta
- Order: Coleoptera
- Suborder: Polyphaga
- Infraorder: Scarabaeiformia
- Family: Scarabaeidae
- Genus: Psammoporus
- Species: P. latipunctus

Binomial name
- Psammoporus latipunctus (Gredler, 1866)

Synonyms
- Aphodius latipunctus Gredler, 1866

Species of beetle

Psammoporus latipunctus is a species of beetle of the family Scarabaeidae. It is found in Austria, Germany, Italy and Switzerland.

== Description ==
Adults reach a length of about 5 mm (0.20 in). They are black, with the elytra dark brown, but lighter along the suture and at the apex.
