= Psammoporus comis =

Scientific classification
- Kingdom: Animalia
- Phylum: Arthropoda
- Clade: Pancrustacea
- Class: Insecta
- Order: Coleoptera
- Suborder: Polyphaga
- Infraorder: Scarabaeiformia
- Family: Scarabaeidae
- Genus: Psammoporus
- Species: P. comis

Binomial name
- Psammoporus comis (Lewis, 1895)

Synonyms
- Psammodius comis Lewis, 1895; Psammoporus freyi Petrovitz, 1961

Species of beetle

Psammoporus comis is a species of beetle of the family Scarabaeidae. It is found in China (Heilongjiang), Japan, Korea and the Russian Far East.

== Description ==
Adults reach a length of about 4.5 mm (0.18 in). They have an elongate, shiny, black body.
