= Theagenes =

Theagenes (Greek: Θεαγένης), also spelled Theogenes, is a masculine given name which may refer to:

== People ==
Ordered chronologically.

- Theagenes of Megara, 7th century BC tyrant of Megara
- Theagenes of Rhegium (fl. 529–522 BC), Greek literary critic
- Theagenes of Thasos, 5th century BC Greek boxer
- Theagenes (patrician) (fl. 470s–480s), Athenian politician, Roman senator and archon
- Theagenes, an Athenian who was appointed with Cleon in 425 BC to go to Pylos and investigate the truth of the tidings of the difficulties of the blockade of Sphacteria, according to Thucydides (though Cleon persuaded the people to abandon the inquiry. [Thuc. iv. 27]) It is possible that this Theagenes is the person who is mentioned by Aristophanes (Vesp. 1183), and who, the scholiast tells us, was an Acharnian (Arnold, ad Thuc. I.e.). A man of the same name is satirized also by Aristophanes (Pax, 894) for his swinish propensities. (See also Arist. Av. 822, 1127, 1295, Lys. 63, with the Scholia.)
- Theagenes, one of the Athenian ambassadors who set forth to Darius Nothus in 408 BC, under promise of a safe conduct from Pharnabazus. The satrap however detained them in custody at the instance of Cyrus, and he could not obtain leave to release them until after the lapse of three years.
- Theogenes, appointed in 404 BC one of the Thirty Tyrants who ruled Athens with a brutal hand, possibly the same person as the ambassador above
- Theagenes of Thebes (died 338 BC), last commander of the Sacred Band of Thebes
- Theagenes of Patras, 2nd century Cynic philosopher
- Theogenes, Egyptian Greek husband of Oenanthe of Egypt (died 203 BC)
- Theogenes, a noted Greek mathematician and astrologer who cast a horoscope for Augustus Caesar
- Theagenes (historian), historian of unknown date
- Saint Theogenes (died c. 262), first bishop of Hippo, saint and martyr
- Saint Theogenes (died c. 320), bishop of Parium, saint and martyr
- Theagenes, bishop of Lysias who attended the Council of Sardica in 344

== Fictional characters ==
- Theagenes, a protagonist of the ancient Greek novel Aethiopica
