= Silluvia elongata =

Scientific classification
- Domain: Eukaryota
- Kingdom: Animalia
- Phylum: Arthropoda
- Class: Insecta
- Order: Coleoptera
- Suborder: Polyphaga
- Infraorder: Scarabaeiformia
- Family: Scarabaeidae
- Genus: Silluvia
- Species: S. elongata

Binomial name
- Silluvia elongata (Landin, 1949)

Species of beetle

Silluvia elongata is a species of beetle in family Scarabaeidae. It was described by Landin in 1949.
