= Silluvia =

Scientific classification
- Domain: Eukaryota
- Kingdom: Animalia
- Phylum: Arthropoda
- Class: Insecta
- Order: Coleoptera
- Suborder: Polyphaga
- Infraorder: Scarabaeiformia
- Family: Scarabaeidae
- Tribe: Aegialiini
- Genus: Silluvia; Landin, 1950

Genus of beetles

Silluvia is a genus of beetle in family Scarabaeidae. It belongs to subfamily Aegialiinae. Silluvia typically occur at high altitudes in the Himalaya and Sino-Tibetan mountains.

== Species ==
Species belonging to this genus are as follows:

- Silluvia elongata
- Silluvia gansuensis
- Silluvia gogona
- Silluvia gosainkundae
- Silluvia himalayanus
- Silluvia igori
- Silluvia kabaki
- Silluvia petrovitzi
- Silluvia shashi
- Silluvia simbuae
- Silluvia sinica
- Silluvia wassuensis
- Silluvia wittmeri
- Silluvia yunnanica
