= Sapriniana griffithi =

Scientific classification
- Kingdom: Animalia
- Phylum: Arthropoda
- Clade: Pancrustacea
- Class: Insecta
- Order: Coleoptera
- Suborder: Polyphaga
- Infraorder: Scarabaeiformia
- Family: Scarabaeidae
- Genus: Sapriniana
- Species: S. griffithi

Binomial name
- Sapriniana griffithi (Blackburn, 1904)

Synonyms
- Saprus griffithi Blackburn, 1904

Species of beetle

Sapriniana griffithi is a species of beetle of the family Scarabaeidae. It is found in Australia (Tasmania).

== Description ==
Adults reach a length of about 3.5–4.5 mm (0.14–0.18 in). They have a shining, dark castaneous body.

== Life history ==
This species may be found in Nothofagus forests.
