= Zeno (emperor) =

Eastern Roman emperor (474–475; 476–491)

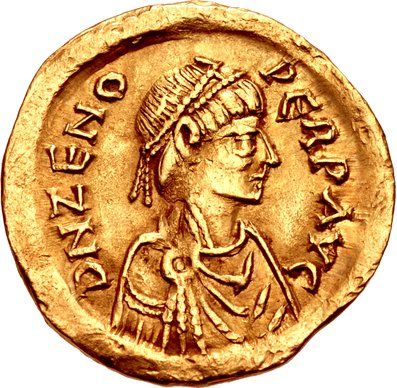
- Semissis of Zeno marked: d·n· zeno perp· aug·

Roman emperor of the East
- 1st reign: 29 January 474 – 9 January 475
- Predecessor: Leo II
- Successor: Basiliscus
- 2nd reign: August 476 – 9 April 491
- Predecessor: Basiliscus
- Successor: Anastasius I
- Rival: Leontius
- Western emperors: Julius Nepos (474–480); Romulus Augustulus (475–476)
- Born: Tarasis (Note: The sources call him "Tarasicodissa Rousombladadiotes", and for this reason it was thought his name was Tarasicodissa. However, it has been demonstrated that this name actually means "Tarasis, son of Kodisa, [coming from] Rusumblada", and that "Tarasis" was a common name in Isauria (R. M. Harrison, "The Emperor Zeno's Real Name", Byzantinische Zeitschrift 74 (1981) 27–28).) c. 425; Rusumblada (thereafter Zenopolis), Isauria, Cilicia (now Elmayurdu, Karaman, Turkey)
- Died: 9 April 491 (aged c. 65); Constantinople (now Istanbul, Turkey)
- Spouse: Arcadia; Ariadne
- Issue: Zenon (by Arcadia); Leo II (by Ariadne)
Regnal name
- Latin: Imperator Caesar Zeno Augustus; Ancient Greek: Αὐτοκράτωρ καῖσαρ Ζήνων αὐγουστος
- Dynasty: Leonid
- Father: Kodisa
- Mother: Lallis

Zeno (/ˈziːnoʊ/; Latin: Zeno; Ancient Greek: Ζήνων, romanized: Zēnōn; c. 425 – 9 April 491) was Eastern Roman emperor from 474 to 475 and again from 476 to 491. His reign was plagued by domestic revolts and religious dissension, but was more successful on the foreign front. He is credited with further stabilizing the Eastern empire, while the Western Roman Empire fell following the deposition of Romulus Augustulus.

Born in Isauria, Zeno was known as Tarasis before adopting his Roman name and becoming an ally of Emperor Leo I, who saw the Isaurian general as an important counterweight against the Germanic leader Aspar. In 466, he married Leo I's daughter, Ariadne, with whom he had a son, Leo. On the death of Leo I in 474, Zeno's seven-year-old son took the throne as Leo II, with Zeno made co-emperor shortly after. Leo II died of an illness later that year, leaving Zeno as the sole emperor.

Despite his early success in making peace with the Vandals, Zeno was an unpopular emperor due to his barbarian origins. In early 475, he was forced to flee Constantinople in a revolt orchestrated in part by dowager Empress Verina, which with Leo I's brother-in-law Basiliscus installing himself as emperor. Seeking refuge in his native Isauria, Zeno later took advantage of Basiliscus's own flagging popularity, convinced the generals Illus and Armatus to defect, marched on the capital and reclaimed the throne in mid-476. Meanwhile, in the western empire, Germanic leader Odoacer deposed the final Western Roman emperor, Romulus Augustulus, and sent the imperial regalia to Constantinople. He expressly acknowledged the suzerainty of Zeno over the West, making Zeno the theoretical sole ruler of a reunified empire. In return, Zeno recognised Odoacer's de facto reign in Italy.

In the late 470s and 480s Zeno faced several revolts, including one from his brother-in-law Marcianus and one from Illus, both of which he ultimately suppressed. He also attempted to deal with hostilities from the two Ostrogothic leaders, Theodoric the Amal (Theodoric the Great) and Theodoric Strabo, by playing them against each other. Following Strabo's early death, Zeno was able to achieve a lasting peace with Theodoric by sending him to Italy, where he defeated Odoacer and established the Ostrogothic Kingdom.

In religious matters, Zeno issued the Henotikon in 482 on the advice of Acacius, the Patriarch of Constantinople, in an unsuccessful attempt to reconcile the differences between the Chalcedonians and the Miaphysites over the nature of Christ. Pope Felix III condemned the document and excommunicated Acacius in 484, beginning the Acacian schism which lasted until 519. Zeno died without an heir in 491 and was succeeded by Anastasius I Dicorus, a courtier chosen by Empress Ariadne.

== Biography ==
=== Rise to power ===
==== Early life ====
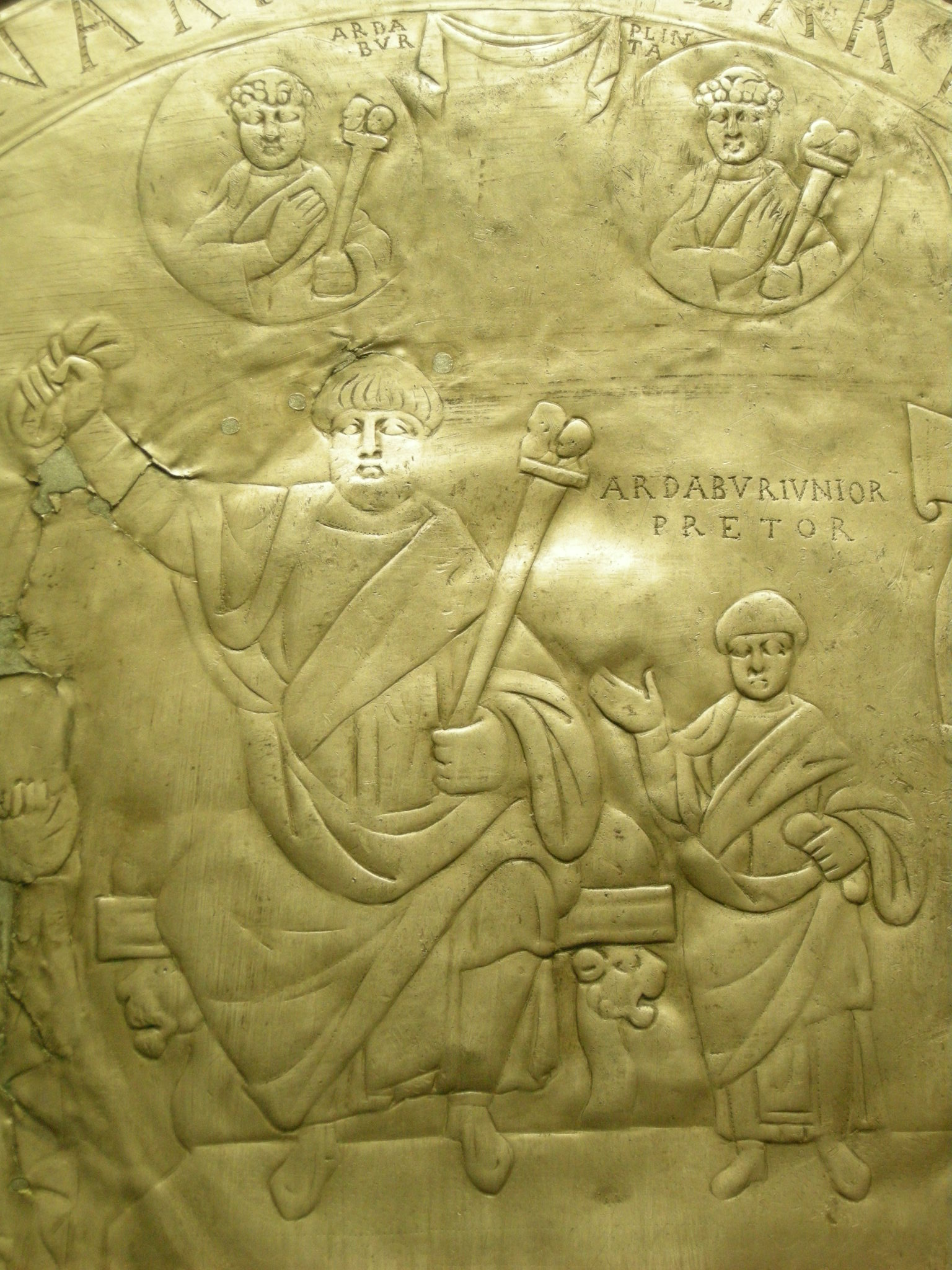
A detail of the Missorium of Aspar, depicting the powerful magister militum Aspar and his elder son Ardabur (c. 434). Zeno caused Ardabur's fall, producing treacherous letters that linked him to the Sassanid King; Ardabur later bribed some of Zeno's soldiers into trying to kill him.

Zeno's original name was Tarasis or more fully Tarasikodissa (Latin: Trascalissaeus) in his native Isaurian language, meaning Tarasis son of Kodissa. Tarasis was born in Isauria, Cilicia, at Rusumblada, later renamed Zenopolis in Zeno's honour. His father was called Kodisa (as attested by his patronymic "Tarasicodissa"), his mother Lallis, his brother Longinus. Tarasis had a first wife, Arcadia, whose name indicates a relationship with the Constantinopolitan aristocracy, and whose statue was erected near the Baths of Arcadius, along the steps that led to Topoi. Near Eastern and other Christian traditions maintain that Zeno had two daughters, Hilaria and Theopiste, who followed a religious life, but historical sources attest the existence of only one son by Arcadia, called Zenon. According to ancient sources, Flavius Zeno's prestigious career—he had fought against Attila in 447 to defend Constantinople and been consul the following year—was the reason why Tarasis, another Isaurian officer, chose the Greek name Zeno when he married into the Imperial family, thus being known as Zeno when he rose to the throne. Some modern historians suggest that the Isaurian general Flavius Zeno was the father of the emperor, but there is no consensus about this, and other sources suggest that Tarasis was a member of Zeno's entourage. A Byzantine Princess, putative daughter of Zeno and first wife Arcadia, named Helen, married as his second wife Saint Vakhtang I Gorgasali, King of Iberia, and had issue.

The Isaurians were a people who lived inland from the Mediterranean coast of Anatolia, in the core of the Taurus Mountains (generally what is now the Konya/Bozkir area of Turkey). Like most borderland tribes, they were looked upon as barbarians by the Romans even though they had been Roman subjects for more than five centuries. However, being Nicene Christians rather than Arians, as the Goths and other Germanic tribes were, they were not formally barred from the throne.

According to some scholars, in the mid-460s, the Eastern Roman Emperor, Leo I, wanted to balance the weight of the Germanic component of the army, whose leader was the Alan magister militum Aspar. He thought that Tarasis and his Isaurians could be that counterweight, and called him, with many Isaurians, to Constantinople. This interpretation, however, has been contested. By the mid-460s, Arcadia and Zeno had been living at Constantinople for some time, where Lallis and Longinus also lived, the latter married to a Valeria, possibly a woman of aristocratic rank.

According to ancient sources, the earliest reference to Tarasis dates back to 464, when he put his hands on some letters written by Aspar's son, Ardabur, which proved that the son of the magister militum had incited the Sassanid King to invade Roman territory, promising to support the invasion. Through these letters, which Tarasis gave to Leo, the Emperor could dismiss Ardabur, who at the time was magister militum per Orientem and patricius, thus reducing Aspar's influence and ambition. As reward for his loyalty, which Leo praised to Daniel the Stylite, Tarasis was appointed comes domesticorum, an office of great influence and prestige. This appointment could mean that Tarasis had been a protector domesticus, either at Leo's court in Constantinople, or attached at Ardabur's staff in Antioch.

In 465, Leo and Aspar quarrelled about the appointment of consuls for the following year; it was on this occasion that Tarasis's position was strengthened, as he became friend and ally of the Emperor. (Note: The source is Photius's epitome of the first book of Candidus of Isauria's chronicle.)

==== Son-in-law of Leo I ====
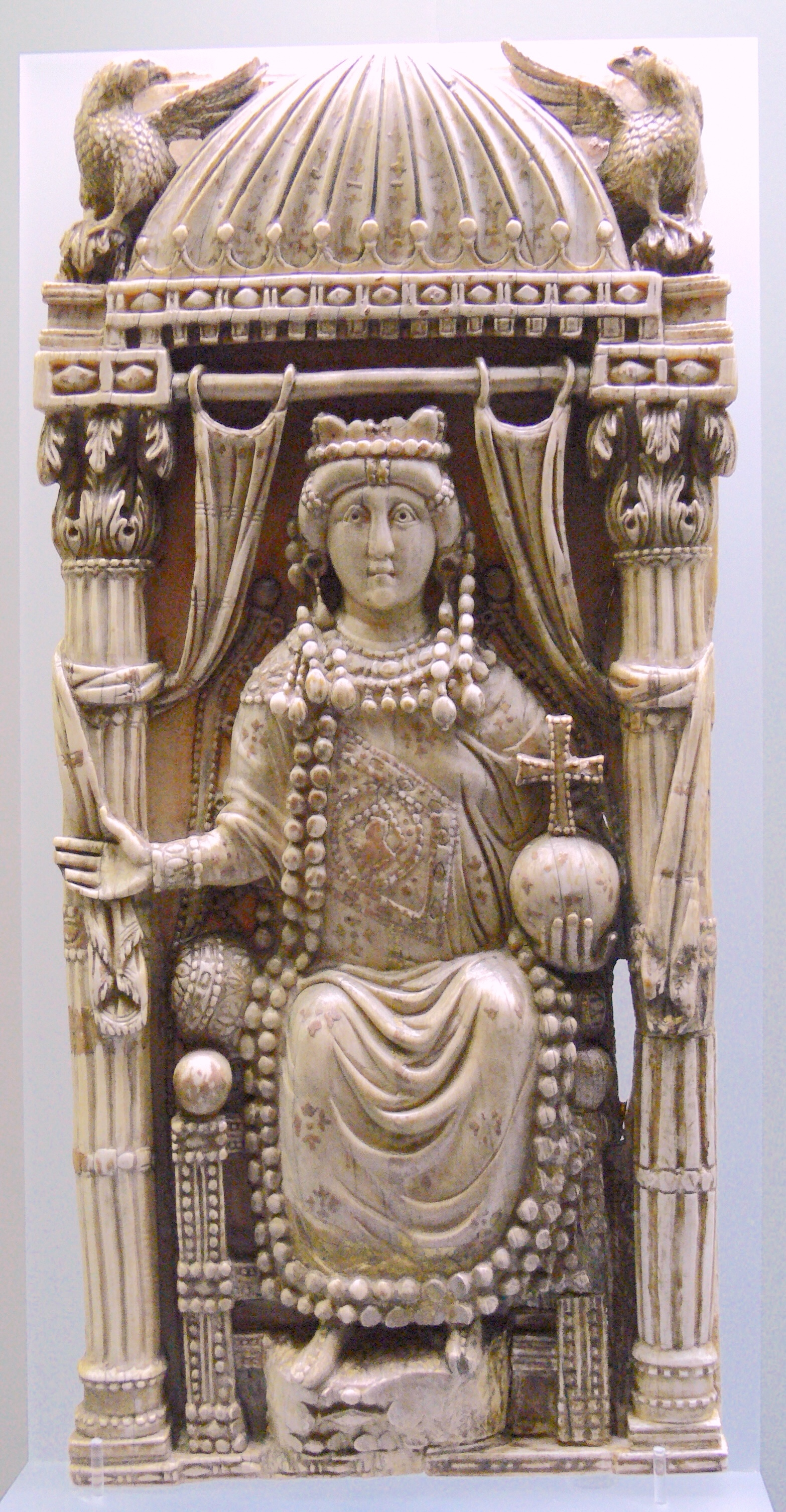
Relief of Ariadne, elder daughter of Emperor Leo I and wife of Zeno

To make himself more acceptable to the Roman hierarchy and the population of Constantinople, Tarasis adopted the Greek name of Zeno and used it for the rest of his life. In mid-late 466, Zeno married Ariadne, elder daughter of Leo I and Verina; there is no reference to him divorcing Arcadia who evidently died prior to this. The next year their son was born, and Zeno became father of the heir apparent to the throne, as the only son of Leo I had died in his infancy; to stress his claim to the throne, the boy was called Leo. Zeno, however, was not present at the birth of his son, as in 467, he participated in a military campaign against the Goths.

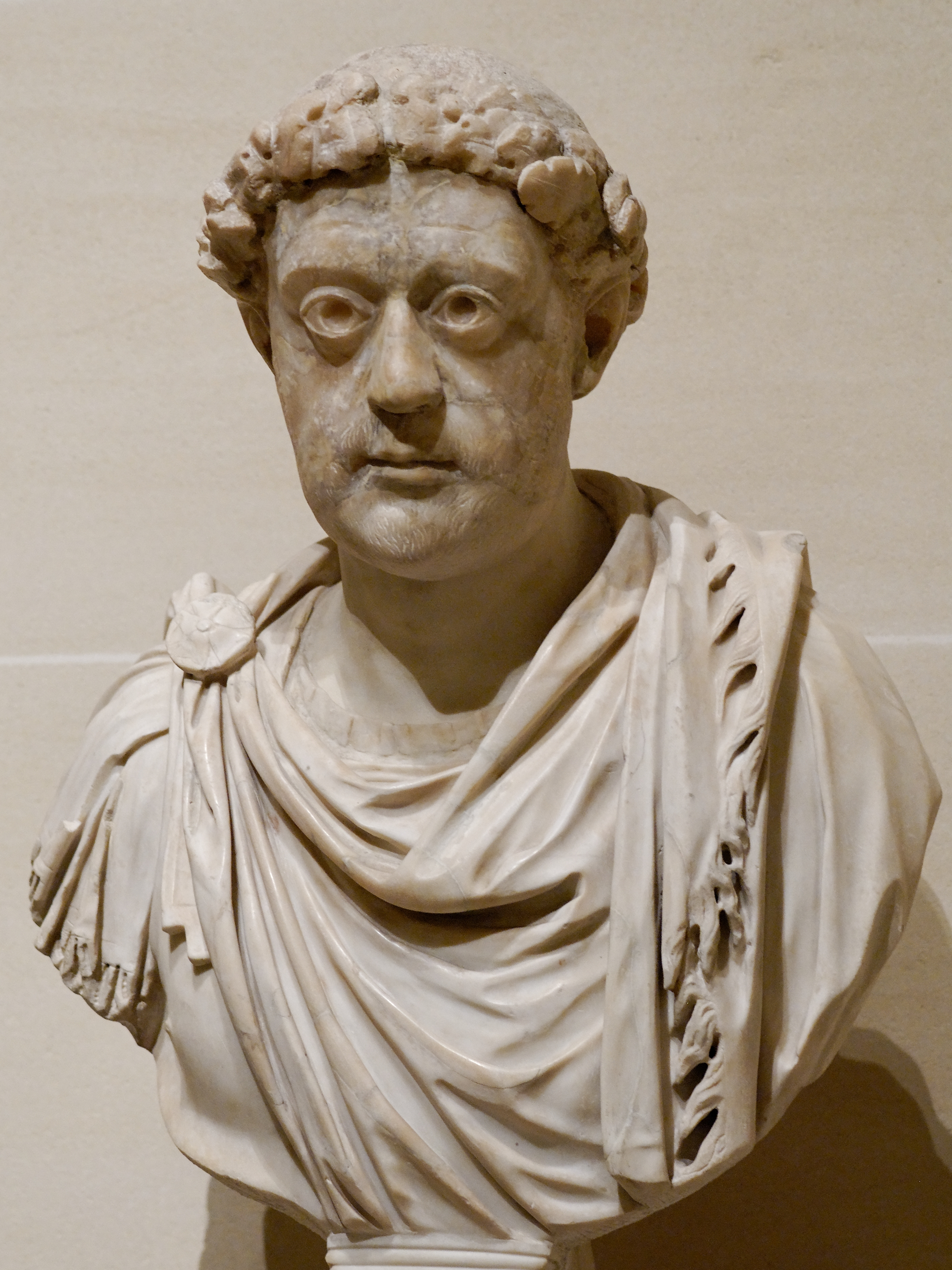
Leo I, father-in-law of Zeno, Eastern Roman Emperor from 457 to 474

Zeno, as a member of the protectores domestici, did not take part in the disastrous expedition against the Vandals, led in 468 by Leo's brother-in-law Basiliscus. The following year, during which he held the honour of the consulate, he was appointed magister militum per Thracias and led an expedition in Thrace. The sources do not clearly state what enemy he fought there, and historians had proposed either Goths or Huns, or the rebels of Anagastes. Either way, before leaving, Leo and Zeno asked for Daniel the Stylite's opinion about the campaign, and Daniel answered that Zeno would be the target of a conspiracy but would escape unharmed. Indeed, Leo sent some of his personal soldiers with Zeno to protect him, but they were bribed by Aspar to capture him instead. Zeno was informed of their intention and fled to Serdica, and, because of this episode, Leo grew even more suspicious of Aspar.

After the attack, Zeno did not return to Constantinople, where Aspar and Ardabur were, still with considerable power. Instead, he moved to the "Long Wall" (the Long Wall of the Thracian Chersonese or, less probably, the Anastasian Wall), then to Pylai and from there to Chalcedon. While waiting here for an opportunity to return to the capital, he was appointed magister militum per Orientem. He took the monk Peter the Fuller with him and left for Antioch, his office's see, passing through Isauria, where he put down the rebellion of Indacus. Zeno stayed at Antioch for two years.

While living in Antioch with his family, Zeno sympathised with the Monophysite views of Peter the Fuller, and supported him against his opponent, the Chalcedonian bishop Martyrius. Monks from nearby monasteries journeyed to Antioch to support Peter, and Zeno first allowed them into the city and then failed to effectively repress their violence. Martyrius went to Constantinople to ask Leo for help, but, on returning to Antioch, he was informed that Peter had been elected bishop, and resigned (470). Leo reacted by ordering Peter into exile and addressing to Zeno a law that forbade the monks from leaving their monasteries or fomenting rebellion (1 June 471). (Note: The law is contained in the Justinian Code (1.3.29).) In 470/471, Zeno had also to deal with an invasion of Tzanni, who attacked Roman Armenia.

With Zeno far from Constantinople, Aspar had increased his influence by having his son Patricius appointed caesar and married to Leo I's younger daughter, Leontia (470). Sources are contradictory on the causes, but clearly state that in 471, Leo I had Aspar and Ardabur treacherously killed. This certainly occurred with Zeno's and Basiliscus's approval, as, on the eve of the murders, the two generals had moved closer to Constantinople (Zeno was at Chalcedon). Thereafter, Zeno returned to Constantinople and was appointed magister militum praesentalis.

=== Reign ===
==== First reign and Basiliscus's revolt (475–476) ====
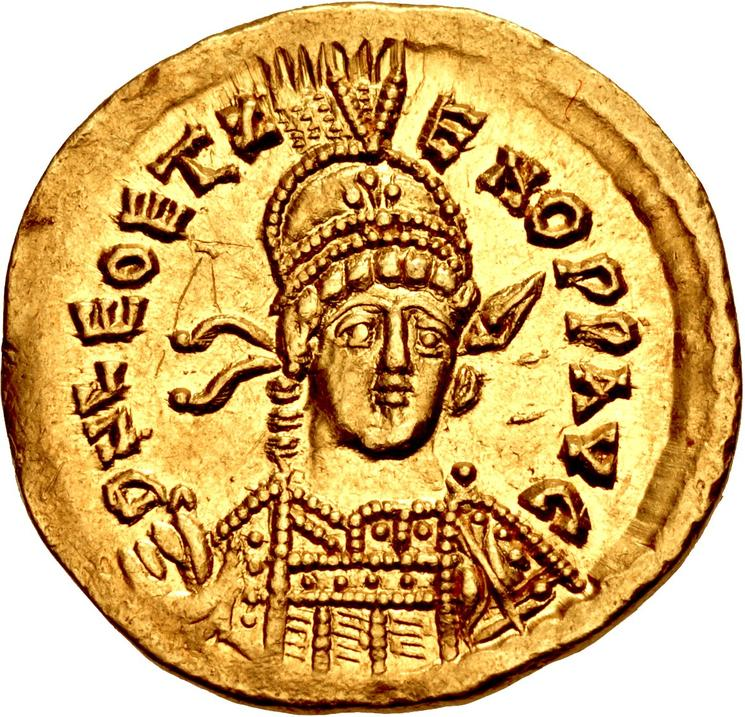
Coin of Leo II, minted in the name of "Leo and Zeno perpetual Augusti"; it belongs to the period when both Zeno and his son were joint emperors, between January and November 474.

In October 473, Leo I appointed as caesar his grandson Leo II, the son of Zeno and Ariadne. On 18 January 474, Leo I died; if Leo II had not already been proclaimed co-emperor by his grandfather, he would have become augustus on that occasion. Since Leo II was seven years old (too young to rule himself) Ariadne and her mother Verina prevailed upon him to crown Zeno, his father, as co-emperor, which he did on 29 January 474. (Note: The Auctarium Prosperi Havniense dates Leo's death and Zeno's coronation on 18 January and 29 January respectively. John Malalas gives February 3 and February 9. The first source is generally considered the most reliable. However, and contradictorily, most authorities use Malalas's 9 February.) When Leo II became ill and died, Zeno became sole emperor.

Zeno had to settle matters with the Vandal King, Genseric, who was conducting raids against the Empire's coastal cities, threatening key commercial sea routes. Zeno sent Genseric a high-ranking officer as ambassador, Severus, who succeeded in stipulating an "eternal" peace between the Vandals and the Empire, which allowed the Romans to pay ransoms for the prisoners in Vandal hands and which ended the Vandal persecution of Nicene Christians in their territory.

Despite this success, Zeno continued to be unpopular with the people and Senate because of his barbarian origins; his right to the throne was limited to his marriage with Ariadne and his relationship to Verina, the dowager Empress. Therefore, he chose to draw support from the Isaurian component of the army, in particular, the Isaurian generals Illus and Trocundes, both brothers. However, Verina decided to overthrow her son-in-law Zeno and replace him with her lover, the ex-magister officiorum Patricius, with the help of her brother Basiliscus. The conspirators fomented riots in the capital against the Isaurian emperor; Basiliscus succeeded also in convincing Illus, Trocundes and the Ostrogothic general Theodoric Strabo to join the plot.

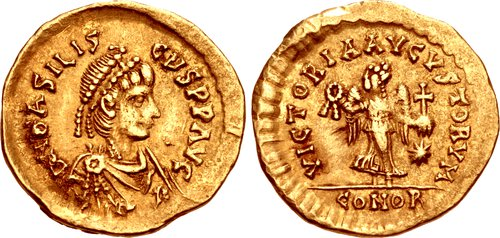
Coin of Basiliscus, who revolted against Zeno in January 475 and held power until Zeno's return in August 476. Basiliscus was Verina's brother; he took power after having Zeno flee from Constantinople, but alienated the people of Constantinople and was captured and put to death by Zeno.

On 9 January 475, Zeno was forced to flee Constantinople to Isauria with his wife and mother, some Isaurian fellows and the Imperial treasure. Illus and Trocundes were sent to chase him, and Zeno was compelled to shut himself up in a fortress, where Illus besieged him, also capturing Zeno's brother Longinus and keeping him as a hostage.

However, the conspirators quickly fell in conflict with each other. Basiliscus took the throne for himself, putting to death Verina's lover and candidate, Patricius. He also allowed the mob to kill all of the Isaurians left in Constantinople, an episode that damaged relations with the Isaurian generals Illus and Trocundes. Basiliscus appointed his nephew Armatus magister militum, thus alienating Theodoric Strabo. Since Zeno had left no money, Basiliscus was forced to levy heavy taxes. Finally, he alienated the Church by supporting the Monophysites. The people of Constantinople also put the blame on him for a great fire that burned several parts of the city. With the secret support of the Senate, and bribes paid by Zeno, Illus agreed to switch sides and united his army with Zeno's, marching on Constantinople. Basiliscus tried to recover popular support and sent another army against Zeno, under his nephew Armatus's command. Zeno succeeded in bribing Armatus too, promising to confirm his rank of magister militum praesentalis for life and promoting his son (also called Basiliscus) to the rank of caesar; Armatus's army failed to intercept Zeno's troops during their march on Constantinople.

In August 476, Zeno besieged Constantinople. The Senate opened the gates of the city to the Isaurian, allowing the deposed emperor to resume the throne. Basiliscus fled with his family to the baptistery of Hagia Sophia. Betrayed by the Patriarch Acacius, he surrendered himself and his family after extracting a solemn promise from Zeno not to shed their blood. Basiliscus and his family were sent to a fortress in Cappadocia, where Zeno had them enclosed in a dry cistern, to die from exposure.

After his restoration, Zeno fulfilled his promises, letting Armatus keep his title of magister militum praesentalis (possibly even raising him to the rank of patricius) and appointing his son Basiliscus Caesar in Nicaea. (Note: There exist some solidi and tremisses in the name of "Zeno and Leo nob[ilissimus] caes[ar]". They have been attributed to Zeno as emperor and to Armatus's son as Caesar; in this case Armatus's son would have changed his name from Basiliscus, the name of the usurper, to Leo, the dynastic name of Zeno's house (Philip Grierson, Melinda Mays, Catalogue of late Roman coins in the Dumbarton Oaks Collection and in the Whittemore Collection: from Arcadius and Honorius to the accession of Anastasius, Dumbarton Oaks, 1992, ISBN 0-88402-193-9, pp. 181–182).)

In 477, however, Zeno changed his mind, probably instigated by Illus, who stood to gain from the fall of Armatus. Armatus was executed, his property confiscated, and his son Basiliscus removed from power and ordained as a priest.

==== End of the Western Empire ====
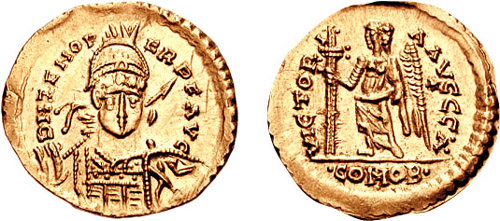
This solidus was minted by Odoacer in the name of Zeno. Odoacer ruled Italy under the formal patronage of the Eastern Emperor.

The western emperor Olybrius died in the autumn of 472. Gundobad, the western magister militum, then proclaimed Glycerius, the comes domesticorum (commander of the Imperial guard) as western emperor in Ravenna. Leo I refused to endorse Glycerius and elevated his nephew Julius Nepos to co-emperor for the west in 473. Expecting resistance, Nepos was forced by bad winter weather to delay his voyage until the next year; it was therefore left to Zeno, as Leo's successor, to support Julius Nepos's installation in Ravenna. Nepos arrived in Italy, quickly deposed Glycerius who offered no resistance, and was proclaimed emperor by the Roman Senate in June 474. Julius was on good terms with Zeno, and he even minted coins in the names of Zeno, Leo II and himself.

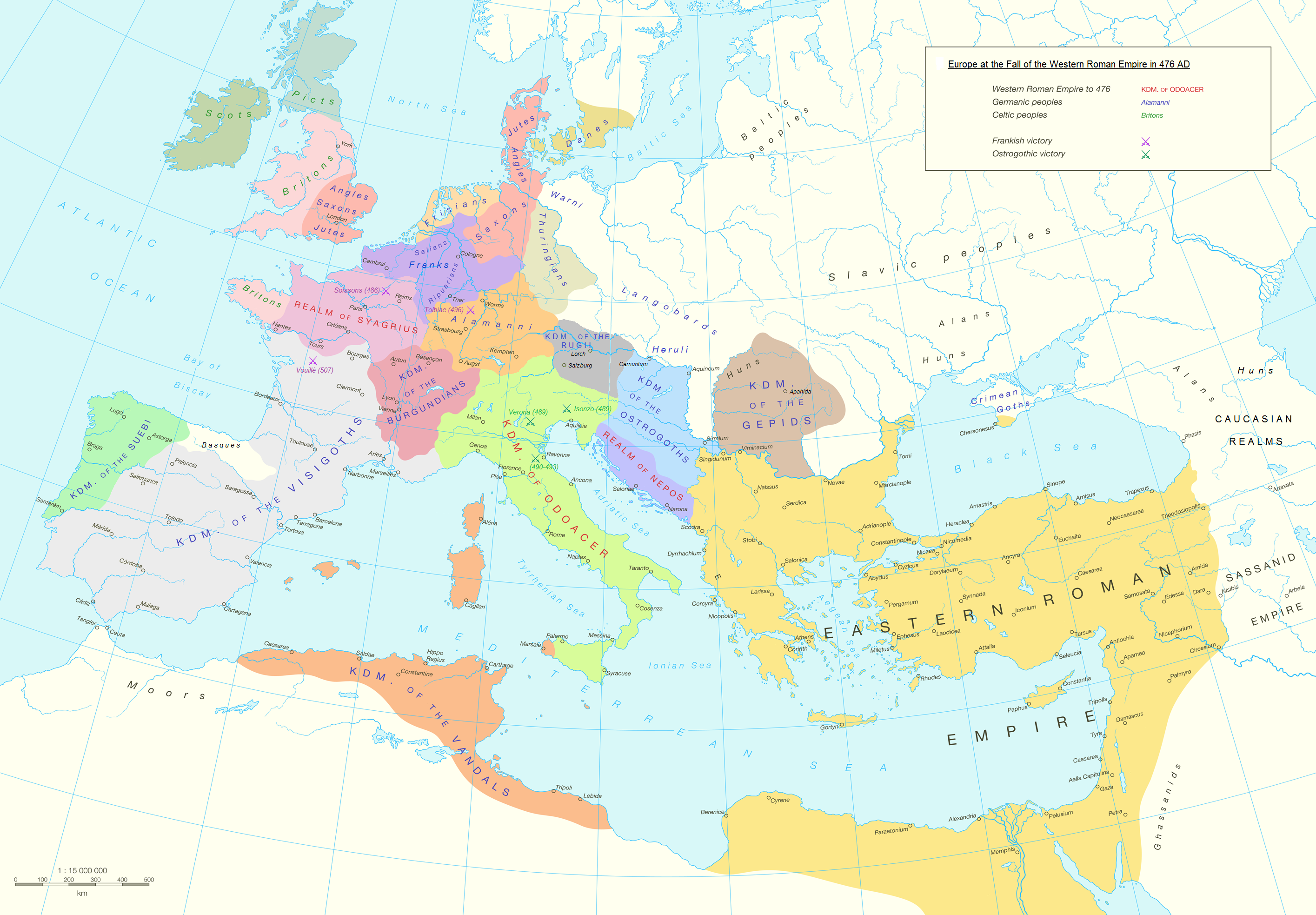
Europe and the Mediterranean Basin at the fall of the Western Roman Empire in 476

In August 475, during Basiliscus's reign, while Zeno was in Isauria blocked by Illus's army, Orestes, the western magister militum, revolted, forcing Nepos to flee Italy for Dalmatia; Orestes proclaimed his own son Romulus Augustus emperor, but was unable to gain the allegiance of the remnants of the Western Empire outside of Italy. One year later, while Zeno was entering Constantinople to end Basiliscus's brief usurpation, Romulus and Orestes were overthrown by the Chieftain Odoacer. With the support of Odoacer, the Roman Senate sent an envoy to present the imperial insignia to the restored Zeno. They asked Zeno to dissolve the separation of the empire and rule as sole Emperor; also, to appoint Odoacer both patricius and official imperial governor of Italy. At the same time, Zeno received another embassy, sent by Julius Nepos, who asked Zeno to give him the money and the army he needed to resume his control of Italy. Zeno answered that the Roman Senate should welcome back Julius Nepos, their rightful emperor, and that Odoacer should properly receive the patriciate from Nepos, although he allowed that he would also grant it. Odoacer was officially recognised and left in possession of Italy, while Nepos kept his title and the other fragments of the empire's western holdings, but no army.

Perhaps in deference to Zeno, Odoacer recognised Nepos's de jure reign in Italy until his death, ruling and even minting coins in his name, but he never allowed his return. After Nepos's assassination in 480, Odoacer invaded Dalmatia to pursue and punish the assassins (and also to take Dalmatia for himself). Zeno legitimised Odoacer's authority in Dalmatia; Odoacer recognised Zeno as sole emperor of the again unitary Empire, but increasingly started using the title of king for himself.

==== Revolt of Marcian (479) ====
Marcian was son of the Western Roman emperor Anthemius (467–472) and maternal grandson of Emperor Marcian (450–457). He had married Ariadne's sister Leontia, and was therefore Zeno's brother-in-law; he was twice consul, in 467 and 472.

In 479 Marcian tried to overthrow Zeno and claim the throne for himself. With the help of his brothers Procopius Anthemius and Romulus, he gathered in Constantinople troops composed of both citizens and foreigners in the house of a Caesarius, south of the Forum of Theodosius, and from there they marched at the same time on the imperial palace and on the house of Illus, who was a supporter of Zeno. The emperor almost fell into the hands of the rebels, who, during the day, overwhelmed the imperial troops, who were also attacked by citizens from the roofs of their houses. During the night, however, Illus moved an Isaurian unit, quartered in nearby Chalcedonia, into Constantinople and also corrupted Marcian's soldiers, who allowed Zeno to flee. The following morning, Marcian, understanding that his situation was desperate and that reinforcements from Theodoric Strabo would not arrive in time, took refuge in the church of the Holy Apostles, but was arrested with his brothers.

Zeno sent Marcian and his brothers to Caesarea in Cappadocia. They tried to flee, but Marcian was captured and obliged to become a monk in Tarsus (Cilicia), or imprisoned in Isauria, in the fortress of Papurius. He tried to escape a second time, and this time he succeeded, but, after gathering new troops and attacking Ancyra, he was defeated and captured by Trocundes, Illus's brother.

==== Revolt of Illus (484–488) ====
The commanding position and popular favour of Illus rendered him an object of suspicion, and Zeno in various ways sought to rid himself of him. Also Verina, the dowager Empress, plotted against his life. Verina's attempt was unsuccessful, and Zeno, equally jealous of her and of Illus, banished her at the suggestion of the latter, confining her in the fort of Papurius. There is some doubt as to the timing of these events. Candidus of Isauria places the banishment of Verina before the revolt of Marcian, and Theodore Lector assigns as the cause of it her share in the revolt of Basiliscus. It is not unlikely, indeed, that this turbulent woman was twice banished, once before Marcian's revolt, for her connection with Basiliscus, and again after Marcian's revolt, for her plot against Illus.

From her prison she managed to persuade her daughter Ariadne, the wife of Zeno, to attempt to obtain her release, first from Zeno, and then from Illus, to whom the Emperor referred her. Illus refused her request. Ariadne, like her mother, attempted to assassinate Illus. Jordanes ascribes her hatred to another cause: he says that Illus had infused jealous suspicions into Zeno's mind which had led Zeno to attempt to end her life, and that her knowledge of these things stimulated her to revenge. The assassin whom she employed only wounded Illus; the assassin was taken prisoner and Zeno, who appears to have been privy to the affair, was unable to prevent his execution.

Illus—with his friend Pamprepius, Leontius and his brother Trocundes—now retired from court. They first went to Nicaea and then, on pretence of change of air and of procuring a cure for his wound, into the East where he was made magister militum. Having traversed Asia Minor, they raised the standard of revolt in 484, when Illus declared Leontius Emperor. Zeno sent an army to fight them, but Illus won, obtained possession of Papurius, released Verina, and induced her to crown Leontius at Tarsus.

In 485 Zeno sent against the rebels a fresh army, said to consist of Macedonians and Scythians (Tillemont conjectures, not unreasonably, that these were Ostrogoths) under John the Hunchback, or, more probably, John the Scythian, and Theoderic the Amal, who was at this time consul. John defeated the rebels near Seleucia and drove them into the fort of Papurius where he blockaded them. After a few months Trocundes died; the fort was taken only after four years of siege, by the treachery of Trocundes's brother-in-law, who had been sent for the purpose from Constantinople by Zeno. Illus and Leontius were beheaded (488) and their heads sent to the Emperor.

==== Affairs with the Goths (474–487) ====
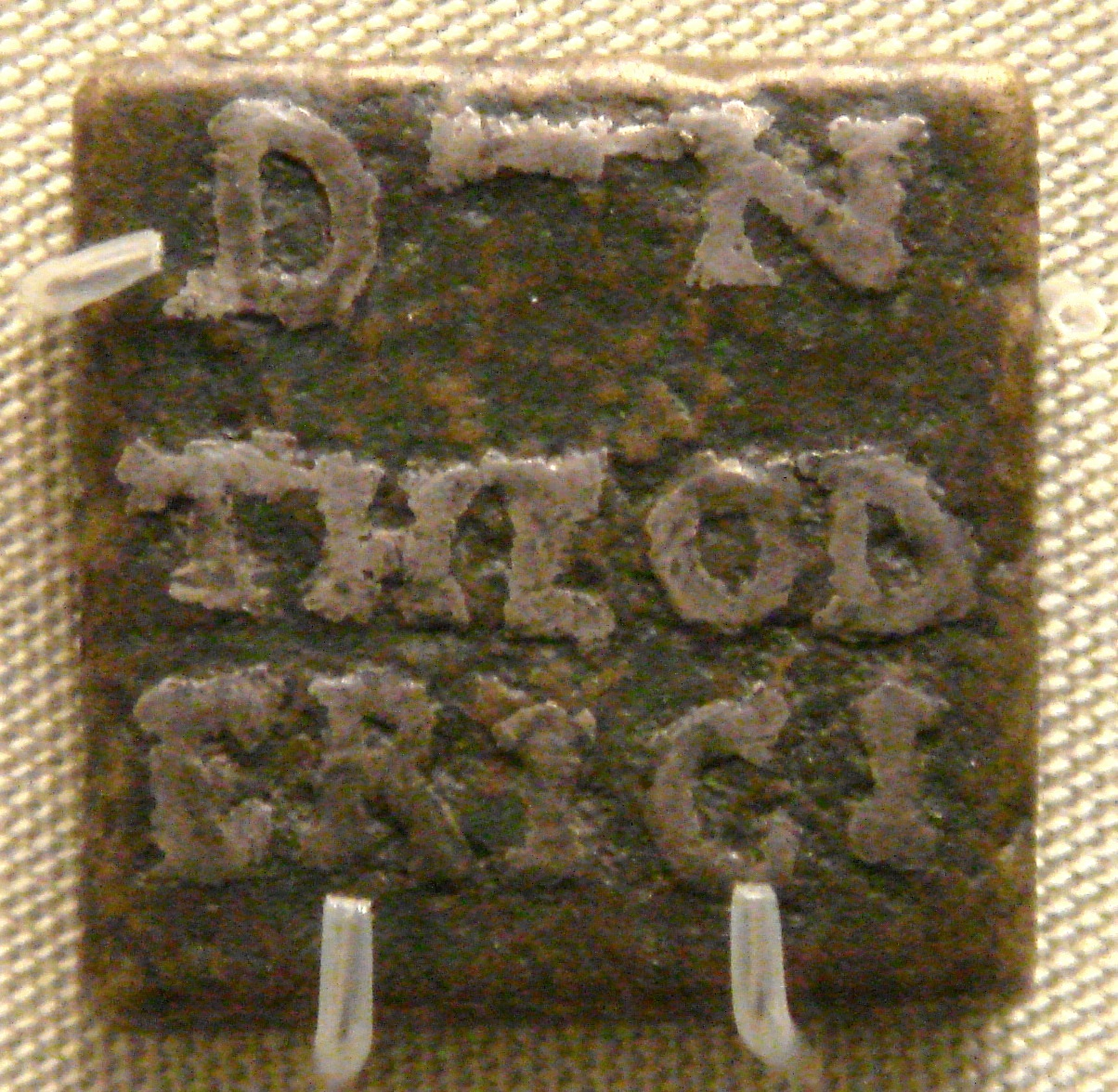
Bronze weight with the name of Theoderic the Great, King of the Ostrogoths and ruler of Italy. Theoderic served under Zeno, fighting against his opponent Theodoric Strabo (476–481), and then was the leader of the army that besieged the fort of Papurius and captured and killed Illus's brother, Trocundes (484).

The aggressions of the two Ostrogothic leaders, Theoderic the Amal (Theoderic the Great), the son of Theodemir and leader of the Moesian Ostrogoths, and Theodoric Strabo, the leader of the Thracian Ostrogoths, had been a constant source of danger since 472. Although Zeno at times contrived to play them off against each other, they in turn were able to profit by his dynastic rivalries. It was only by offering them pay and high command that he kept them from attacking Constantinople itself.

At the death of Leo II, Theodoric Strabo rebelled against Zeno. His support was instrumental in overthrowing Zeno and raising Basiliscus to the Byzantine throne (475), but Theodoric and Basiliscus had a falling-out, so when Zeno returned to Constantinople in 476 and defeated Basiliscus, Strabo was reported to have not defended the city. (Note: Zeno had become allied in this occasion with Theoderic the Amal, whose Goths had moved to attack the Empire. It has been suggested that Constantinople was defenceless during Zeno's siege because the magister militum Strabo had moved to the north to counter this menace. See Heather, Peter (1998). Goths. Blackwell Publishing. pp. 158–159. ISBN 978-0-631-20932-4.)

In 476/477, Zeno allied himself with Strabo's rival, Theoderic the Amal, and ordered him to attack Strabo. The leader of the Thracian Goths sent an embassy to the Emperor, offering peace and blaming the Moesian Theodoric. Zeno understood that this offering was hiding further conspiracies, and convinced the Senate and army to declare Strabo a public enemy.

Zeno's plan was to have the two Theoderics attack each other. He sent the Amal against Strabo, who supported the revolt of Marcianus, with the promise of a huge Roman force as reinforcement (478). When Theoderic the Amal arrived through the mountains at Mount Soundis, he did not find the Roman reinforcement army he expected, but instead Theodoric Strabo's army, in a strongly fortified camp. The two Theoderics agreed to put forward a joint request to the Emperor, in order to extend to the south the settlement territory of the Ostrogoths in Moesia.

Zeno tried to divide the two Theoderics by bribing the Amal, but he refused the bribe. The Imperial army obtained some initial successes, but Zeno did not press his advantage, and allowed the Amal to move westward in Thrace, plundering territories as he went. With the Amal far away, Strabo accepted an agreement with Zeno: Strabo was to be given back his wealth, money to pay 13,000 soldiers, the command of two palatinae units, and the title once more of magister militum. However, the army of Theodoric Strabo, 30,000-men strong was still a menace for Zeno, who convinced the Bulgars to attack the Thracian Goths in their own base. Strabo defeated the Bulgars in 480/481, and moved towards Constantinople, but he had to deal with problems with his own men, so he could not capitalise upon his victory and was forced to return to Greece. On his way back, he died in an accident.

After Theodoric Strabo died in 481, the future Theoderic the Great became king of the entire Ostrogoth nation and continued to be a source of trouble in the Balkan peninsula. Zeno allied to Theoderic, whom he appointed magister militum praesentalis and even consul for the year 484, the first time a barbarian who was not a citizen of the Empire reached such a high distinction. Zeno had Theoderic fight against Illus and the usurper Leontius, besieging them at Papurius in 484–488. However, in 486 Theoderic revolted again and attacked Constantinople, severing the city's water supply. Zeno bought a peace and agreed with Theoderic that the Ostrogoths should have gone to invade Italy to fight Odoacer, who had allegedly supported Leontius, and to establish his new kingdom there (487). This all but eliminated the Germanic presence in the east.

==== Promulgation of the Henotikon (482) ====
In religious matters, Zeno is famous for his Henotikon, or "Act of Union", issued in 482 to mediate between Chalcedonian and Miaphysite views about the nature of Christ. The Chalcedonians recognised two natures (physis) in Christ, the Miaphysites only one; the Council of Chalcedon (451) had issued the Chalcedonian Creed and condemned the Miaphysite position, but the Miaphysites were still strong, especially in the Eastern provinces of the Empire, and the Patriarch of Alexandria, Peter Mongus, was a Miaphysite. Supporting the Miaphysites was one of the mistakes made by Basiliscus, as the people of Constantinople were Chalcedonian, but Zeno needed the support of the Miaphysite provinces—Egypt, Syria, Palestine and Asia Minor; also, the Patriarch of Constantinople, Acacius, was interested in reducing the distance between the two positions.

Therefore, in 482 Zeno issued the Henotikon, a document he had developed with the support of Acacius and addressed to the factions in Egypt. The edict affirmed the Nicene-Constantinopolitan Creed (i.e., the Creed of Nicaea completed at Constantinople) as affording a common, final and united symbol or expression of faith. All other symbola or mathemata were excluded; Eutyches and Nestorius were unmistakably condemned in an anathema, while the twelve chapters of Cyril of Alexandria were accepted. The teaching of Chalcedon was not so much repudiated as passed over in silence; Jesus Christ was described as the "only-begotten Son of God [...] one and not two" and there was no explicit reference to the two natures.

The bishop of Rome, Pope Felix III, refused to accept the document and excommunicated Acacius (484), thus beginning the Acacian schism, which lasted until 519.

In 488 the patriarch of Antioch, Peter the Fuller, came to Constantinople to have his right to the Church of Cyprus confirmed. Zeno called the bishop of Cyprus, Anthemius, to answer the accusations. The bishop claimed that before his departure, he had had a vision of St. Barnabas, in which the position of the tomb of the apostle had been revealed to him. In the tomb, Anthemius had found the relics of the apostle and a copy of the Gospel of Matthew written in Hebrew by Barnabas himself. Zeno received the relics and the manuscript, and in exchange he proclaimed the autonomy of the Church of Cyprus.

In 489 Zeno closed the Persian school of Edessa in Mesopotamia, by request of bishop Cyrus II of Edessa, because it promoted Nestorian teachings, and built a church in its place. The school relocated to its original home of Nisibis, becoming again the School of Nisibis, and leading to a wave of Nestorian immigration into Persia.

==== Suppressing the Samaritan revolt (484) ====
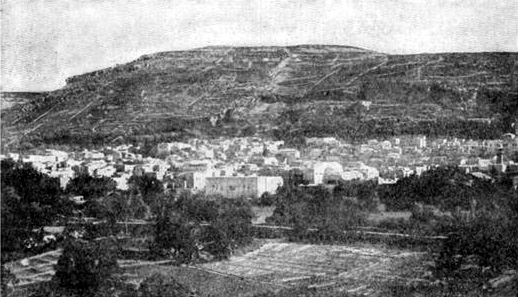
Mount Gerizim, where Samaritan sources have Zeno buried

According to Samaritan sources, Zeno (whom the sources call "Zait the King of Edom") persecuted the Samaritans. The Emperor went to Sichem (Neapolis), gathered the elders and asked them to convert; when they refused, Zeno had many Samaritans killed, and converted the synagogue to a church. Zeno then took for himself Mount Gerizim, where the Samaritans worshipped God, and built several edifices, among which a tomb for his recently deceased son, on which he put a cross, so that the Samaritans, worshipping God, would prostrate in front of the tomb. According to these same sources, Zeno was buried on Mount Gerizim.

Later, in 484, the Samaritans revolted. The rebels attacked Sichem, burnt five churches built on Samaritan holy places and cut off the fingers of bishop Terebinthus, who was officiating the ceremony of Whitsun. They elected Justa (or Justasa/Justasus) as their king and moved to Caesarea, where a significant Samaritan community lived. Here several Christians were killed and the church of St. Sebastian was destroyed. Justa celebrated the victory with games in the circus. According to John Malalas, the dux Palestinae Asclepiades, whose troops were reinforced by the Caesarea-based Arcadiani of Rheges, defeated Justa, killed him and sent his head to Zeno. According to Procopius of Caesarea, Terebinthus went to Zeno to ask for revenge; the Emperor personally went to Samaria to quell the rebellion.

Modern historians believe that the order of the facts preserved by Samaritan sources should be inverted, as the persecution of Zeno was a consequence of the rebellion rather than its cause, and should have happened after 484, around 489. Zeno rebuilt the church of St. Procopius in Neapolis (Sichem) and the Samaritans were banned from Mount Gerizim, on whose top a signalling tower was built to alert in case of civil unrest.

=== Death and succession ===
Zeno died on 9 April 491, of dysentery or of epilepsy, after ruling for 17 years and 2 months. No sons were to succeed him: Leo had died in 474, Zenon, the first son, in his youth, while living at court. Ariadne chose a favoured member of the Imperial court, Anastasius, to succeed Zeno. Zeno's brother Longinus then revolted, starting the Isaurian War.

The chroniclers George Kedrenos (eleventh century) and Joannes Zonaras (twelfth century) allege that Ariadne had Zeno locked up in a tomb while he was unconscious from drinking or acute illness. She ordered passersby to ignore Zeno's cries for help after he awoke; he survived for a time by eating the flesh of his own arms, but eventually perished. This is one of the first historical mentions of the theme of the buried alive devouring their arms or hands. (Note: The passages from Kedrenos and Zonaras are quoted by Michael Whitby, The ecclesiastical history of Evagrius Scholasticus, Liverpool University Press, 2000, p. 164. The theme of the person buried alive, exhumed and found dead after having devoured his hands, is repeated later for other characters, such as the scholastic Duns Scotus or others less known. See also Claudio Milanesi, Apparent death, imperfect death. Medicine and mentalities in the 18th century, Paris, Payot, 1991, pp. 16–17.) This tale is likely false, as earlier and contemporary sources do not mention it, even though they too were hostile to his memory.

== In popular culture ==
A game of τάβλη (tabula) played by Zeno in 480 and recorded by Agathias in circa 530 because of a very unlucky dice result for Zeno. The game is similar to backgammon; Zeno (red) threw 2, 5 and 6 and was forced to leave eight pieces alone and thus exposed to capture. This is considered by some historians to be the first recorded bad beat story in human history.

Zeno was a player of tabula, a game nearly identical to modern backgammon. (Note: Τάβλη is still used to refer to backgammon in Greece.) In 480 he had a hand that was so unlucky that he wrote an epigram to record it; Agathias reproduced it half a century later and this allowed the game to be reconstructed in the 19th century. Zeno, who was red, had a stack of seven checkers, three stacks of two checkers and two blots, checkers that stand alone on a point and are therefore in danger of being put outside the board by an incoming opponent checker. Zeno threw the three dice with which the game was played and obtained 2, 5 and 6. As in backgammon, Zeno could not move to a space occupied by two opponent (black) pieces. The red and black checkers were so distributed on the points that the only way to use all of the three results, as required by the game rules, was to break the three stacks of two checkers into blots, thus exposing them to capture and ruining the game for Zeno. This is considered by some historians to be the first recorded bad beat story in human history.

Zeno is the protagonist of a theatrical drama in Latin, called Zeno, composed c. 1641 by the Jesuit playwright Joseph Simons and performed in 1643 in Rome at the Jesuit English College. An anonymous Greek drama is modelled on this Latin Zeno, belonging to the so-called Cretan Theatre. This version was written and performed at Zakynthos in 1682–83 and has Zeno buried alive and his brother Longinus executed.

The play Romulus the Great (1950), by Friedrich Dürrenmatt, has Zeno as one of its characters. The plot is loosely based on history; here Zeno flees to Italy and tries to convince Romulus Augustulus to unite their forces and fight together, but his plan fails. Dürrenmatt's Zeno is an Emperor oppressed by the Byzantine ceremonial.

Regnal titles
Preceded by Leo II	Eastern Roman emperor 474–475	Succeeded by Basiliscus
Preceded by Basiliscus	Eastern Roman emperor 476–491	Succeeded by Anastasius I
Political offices
Preceded by Anthemius Augustus II	Roman consul 469 with Marcianus	Succeeded by Messius Phoebus Severus, Iordanes
Preceded by Leo junior Augustus,	Roman consul 475	Succeeded by Basiliscus Augustus II, Armatus
Preceded by Illus	Roman consul 479	Succeeded by Caecina Decius Maximus Basilius
