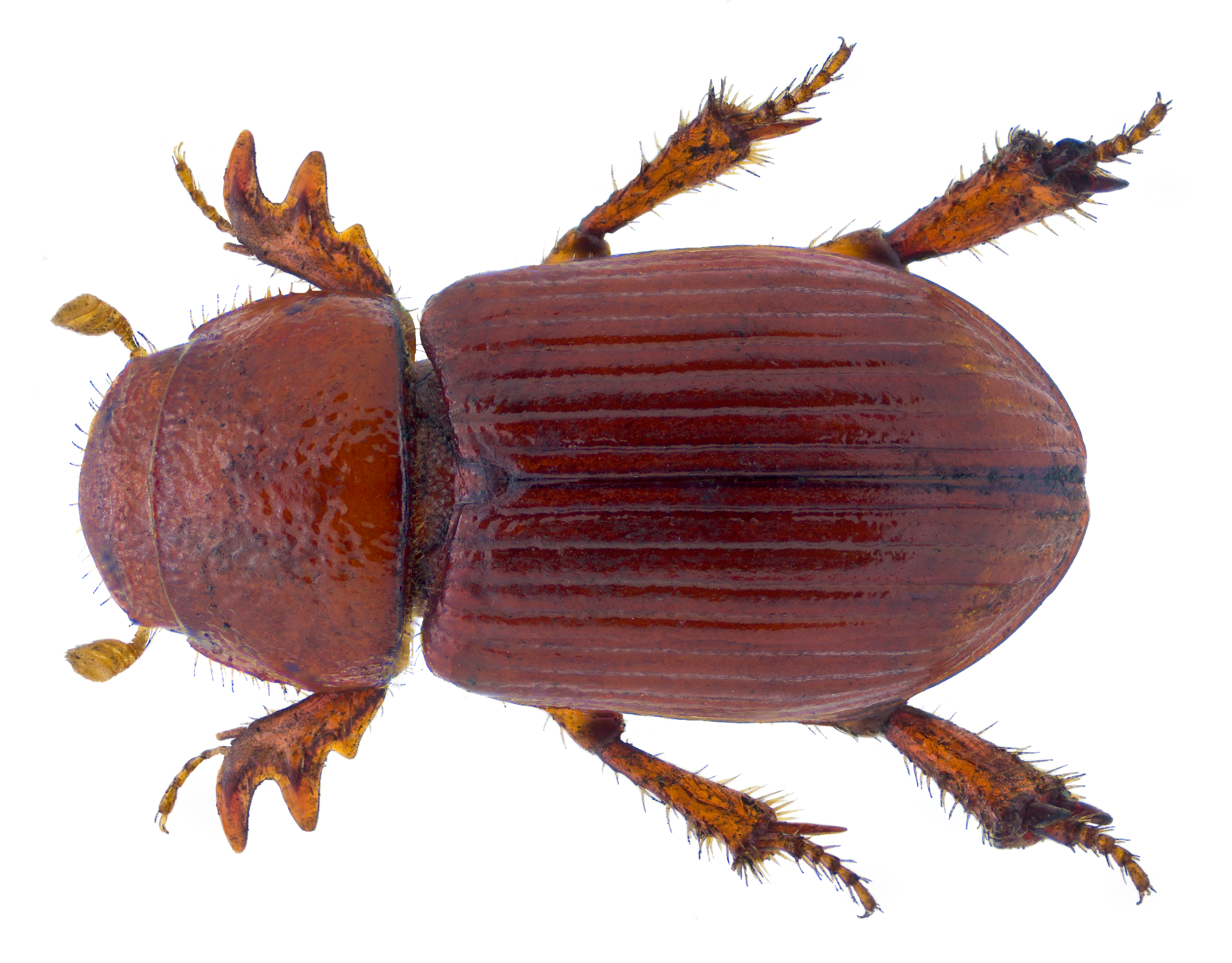

Scientific classification
- Kingdom: Animalia
- Phylum: Arthropoda
- Clade: Pancrustacea
- Class: Insecta
- Order: Coleoptera
- Suborder: Polyphaga
- Infraorder: Scarabaeiformia
- Family: Scarabaeidae
- Subfamily: Aegialiinae
- Tribe: Aegialiini
- Genus: Rhysothorax; Bedel, 1911
- Species: R. rufus

Binomial name
- Rhysothorax rufus (Fabricius, 1792)

Synonyms
- Scarabaeus rufus Fabricius, 1792; Aegialia rufina Silfverberg, 1977; Mothon arnoldii Medvedev, 1951; Aegialia spissipes LeConte, 1878

= Rhysothorax =

Genus of beetle

Rhysothorax is a genus of dung beetles in the family Scarabaeidae, containing only one species, Rhysothorax rufus, which is found in Belgium, Bulgaria, Denmark, France, Germany, Great Britain, Kazakhstan, Latvia, Lithuania, the Netherlands, Norway, Poland, Romania, Russia, Sweden, Ukraine, Canada (Newfoundland, Nova Scotia, Ontario, Quebec) and the United States (Colorado, Massachusetts, Michigan, Nebraska, Wisconsin).

== Description ==
Adults reach a length of about 5 mm (0.20 in). They have an elongate-oval, convex, glossy, reddish-brown body, with the sides of the pronotum yellowish-red.

== Taxonomy ==
It has at times been classified as a subgenus within Aegialia.
