= Caelius denticollis =

Scientific classification
- Kingdom: Animalia
- Phylum: Arthropoda
- Clade: Pancrustacea
- Class: Insecta
- Order: Coleoptera
- Suborder: Polyphaga
- Infraorder: Scarabaeiformia
- Family: Scarabaeidae
- Genus: Caelius
- Species: C. denticollis

Binomial name
- Caelius denticollis Lewis, 1895

Species of beetle

Caelius denticollis is a species of beetle of the family Scarabaeidae. It is found in Japan.

== Description ==
Adults reach a length of about 3.5 mm (0.14 in). The upper surface is glossy, glabrous and entirely reddish-brown.
