= Sapriniana lawrencei =

Scientific classification
- Kingdom: Animalia
- Phylum: Arthropoda
- Clade: Pancrustacea
- Class: Insecta
- Order: Coleoptera
- Suborder: Polyphaga
- Infraorder: Scarabaeiformia
- Family: Scarabaeidae
- Genus: Sapriniana
- Species: S. lawrencei

Binomial name
- Sapriniana lawrencei (Stebnicka & Howden, 1995)

Synonyms
- Saprus lawrencei Stebnicka & Howden, 1995

Species of beetle

Sapriniana lawrencei is a species of beetle of the family Scarabaeidae. It is found in Australia (New South Wales).

== Description ==
Adults reach a length of about 2.7–3 mm (0.11–0.12 in). They have a parallel-sided, slightly shining, rusty-brown body, with a greyish antennal club.

== Etymology ==
The species is named in honour of John Lawrence.
