= Sapriniana weiri =

Scientific classification
- Kingdom: Animalia
- Phylum: Arthropoda
- Clade: Pancrustacea
- Class: Insecta
- Order: Coleoptera
- Suborder: Polyphaga
- Infraorder: Scarabaeiformia
- Family: Scarabaeidae
- Genus: Sapriniana
- Species: S. weiri

Binomial name
- Sapriniana weiri (Stebnicka & Howden, 1995)

Synonyms
- Saprus weiri Stebnicka & Howden, 1995

Species of beetle

Sapriniana weiri is a species of beetle of the family Scarabaeidae. It is found in Australia (New South Wales).

== Description ==
Adults reach a length of about 3.8–3.9 mm (0.15–0.15 in). They have an elongate, shining, reddish-brown body.

== Etymology ==
The species is named in honour of Tom Weir.
