= Micraegialia =

Scientific classification
- Domain: Eukaryota
- Kingdom: Animalia
- Phylum: Arthropoda
- Class: Insecta
- Order: Coleoptera
- Suborder: Polyphaga
- Infraorder: Scarabaeiformia
- Family: Scarabaeidae
- Tribe: Aegialiini
- Genus: Micraegialia (Brown, 1931)

Genus of beetles

Micraegialia is a genus of beetle in the family Scarabaeidae. It belongs to subfamily Aegialiinae. The genus contains only one known species, Micraegialia pusilla.
