= Psammoporus =

Scientific classification
- Kingdom: Animalia
- Phylum: Arthropoda
- Clade: Pancrustacea
- Class: Insecta
- Order: Coleoptera
- Suborder: Polyphaga
- Infraorder: Scarabaeiformia
- Family: Scarabaeidae
- Subfamily: Aegialiinae
- Tribe: Aegialiini
- Genus: Psammoporus; Thomson, 1859

Synonyms
- Dimalia Mulsant & Rey, 1870

Genus of beetles

Psammoporus is a genus of beetles of the family Scarabaeidae.

== Species ==
- Psammoporus abdita Nikritin, 1975
- Psammoporus comis (Lewis, 1895)
- Psammoporus criddlei (Brown, 1931)
- Psammoporus cylindricus (Eschscholtz, 1822)
- Psammoporus exaratus (Mannerheim, 1853)
- Psammoporus friebi (Balthasar, 1935)
- Psammoporus hybridus (Reitter, 1892)
- Psammoporus insularis Pittino, 2006
- Psammoporus kamtschaticus (Motschulsky, 1860)
- Psammoporus lacustris (LeConte, 1850)
- Psammoporus latipunctus (Gredler, 1866)
- Psammoporus matalini (Gusakov, 2003)
- Psammoporus mimicus Pittino, 2006
- Psammoporus nakanei Masumoto, 1986
- Psammoporus nanus (Brown, 1931)
- Psammoporus opacus (Brown, 1931)
- Psammoporus sabuleti (Panzer, 1796)
- Psammoporus sibirica (Stebnicka, 1977)
- Psammoporus terminalis (Brown, 1931)
- Psammoporus tsukamotoi Masumoto, 1986
