= Theagenes (patrician) =

Athenian politician

Theagenes (Greek: Θεαγένης, floruit 470s–480s) was an Athenian politician.

== Biography ==
A native of Athens, Theagenes belonged to a wealthy and aristocratic family that claimed descent from Miltiades and Plato. He had a wife, Asclepideneia, who was the great-granddaughter of the Neoplatonic philosopher Plutarch of Athens. He also had a son called Hegias.

He was a Roman senator, a patricius and an archon. He was a supporter of the Neoplatonic school of Proclus. After Proclus' death however, Theagenes came into conflict with the school's headmasters, as he used its patronage to increase his own prestige. He was a supporter of Pamprepius when the poet went to Athens, but later they fell out (Theagenes styled himself a philosopher, while Pamprepius' ambition was to become the best philosopher) and Pamprepius was forced to leave the city.

A panegyric dedicated to Theagenes, probably written by Pamprepius, exists.
