= Malchus (historian) =

Byzantine historian

Malchus (Ancient Greek: Μάλχος, Málkhos) was a 5th-century Byzantine historian of an Arab origin from the city of Philadelphia (Amman). According to the Suda, Malchus was a Byzantine (i.e. from Constantinople); but Photius states that he was a native of Philadelphia; the ancient Rabbah in the country of Ammonitis, east of the River Jordan. His name makes it probable that he originally came from the Arab people around Philadelphia, as his name is alike the Arab name Malek (مالك) .

Malchus probably followed his profession of rhetorician or sophist at Constantinople. According to the Suda, he wrote a history extending from the reign of Constantine I to that of Anastasius I; but the work in seven books, of which Photius has given an account (Bibl. cod. 78), and to which he gives the title Βυζαντιακά, comprehended only the period from the final sickness of the Eastern emperor Leo I (473 or 474), to the death of Julius Nepos, emperor of the West (480). It has been supposed that this was an extract from the work mentioned in the Suda, or a mutilated copy: that it was incomplete is said by Photius himself, who says that the start of the first of the seven books showed that the author had already written some previous parts, and that the close of the seventh book showed his intention of carrying it further, if his life was spared.

Some scholars, among them Valesius, have thought that the history of Malchus began with Leo's sickness, and that he was the continuator of Priscus, whose history is supposed to have left off at that point. Barthold Georg Niebuhr supposed that this coincidence arose from Photius having met with a portion only of the work of Malchus, which had been inserted in some historical Catena after the work of Priscus; or that the history of the previous period had been given by Malchus in another work. The Suda speaks of the history in its whole extent; it may have been published in successive parts, as the author was able to finish it; and Photius possibly had met with only one part.

Photius praises the style of Malchus as a model of historical composition; pure, free from redundancy and consisting of well-selected words and phrases. He notices also his eminence as a rhetorician, and says that he was favourable to Christianity; a statement which has been thought inconsistent with the praises for Pamprepius. The works of Malchus are lost, except the portions contained in the Excerpta of Constantine VII, and some extracts in Suda.
