= John of Antioch (historian) =

7th-century monk and chronicler

John of Antioch (Greek: Ίωάννης Άντιοχείας) was a 7th-century chronicler, who wrote in Greek. He was a monk, apparently contemporary with Emperor Heraclius (reigned 610–41). Heinrich Gelzer identifies the author with the Syrian Orthodox Patriarch of Antioch John of the Sedre, who ruled from 630 to 648.

== Historia chronike ==
John of Antioch's chronicle, Historia chronike, is a universal history stretching from Adam to the death of Phocas; it is one of the many adaptations and imitations of the better known chronicle of John Malalas. His sources include Eutropius (whose organization he followed) and Plutarch, as well as Sextus Julius Africanus, Eusebius, and Ammianus Marcellinus. It was divided into 14 books, of which the first 5 (the "Ancient History") covered the period from Creation up to the reign of Philip II of Macedon, the next 5 (the "Books of the Consuls", Ancient Greek: λόγοι ὑπάτων) covered the Roman Republic up to 30 BC, and the last 4 (the "Books of the Emperors") covered the Roman Empire through the reign of Phocas. A manuscript found in 1899 in the Monastery of Iviron on Mount Athos preserves the entire 4th Book of the Consuls, plus the end of the 3rd and the beginning of the 5th; of the rest of the chronicle only fragments remain. In the main extant section of the text, his method was in each book to summarize the corresponding book of Eutropius, with various added details (in the case of the surviving Book 4 mainly drawn from Plutarch's life of Sulla), and to add to each book a brief appendix on some matters not covered by Eutropius. He generally repeats even the mistakes made by Eutropius (e.g., conflating Attalus II and III), and sometimes adds his own misunderstandings of his historical sources (as when he declares that Sulla was dictator for two separate terms, or when he misinterprets ἱππεῖς in that context as cavalry soldiers).

The fragments of the chronicle are contained in two collections, the Codex Parisinus 1763, which was published in an edition by Claudius Salmasius, and the encyclopedia of history in fifty-three chapters made by order of Constantine VII Porphyrogenitus (912–59), the so-called Excerpta Constantiniana. Of the Constantinian collection only parts remain. Two titles: "Of Virtue and Vice" and "Of Conspiracies against Emperors" contain the literary remains of John of Antioch. A difficulty arises from the fact that a great part of the extracts (from the Roman Commonwealth of Justin I) differs considerably from the corresponding quotations in the Salmasian collection. The Constantinian passages are of the nature the old Hellenic writing of history, the Salmasian ones are rather Byzantine and Christian. The Salmasian compilation is older, and so appears to be the original text; the other is no doubt a re-arrangement made under the influence of the Hellenic Renaissance started by patriarch Photius. But some authorities see in them two different originals and speak of a "Constantinian" and a "Salmasian" John of Antioch.

The Salmasian excerpts are edited by Cramer, Anecdota Graecae cod. mss. regiae Parisiensis, II, Oxford 1839, 383–401. Both series of fragments are in C. Muller, "Fragmenta Historicorum Graecorum", vol. IV, Paris, 1883, 535–622; V, 27–8.

== Influence ==
John of Antioch's history was evidently seen positively by the later Byzantine writers. Besides its inclusion in the Constantinian Excerpts, Maximus Planudes included fragments of it in an anthology of historians, and the Suda makes extensive use of it. However, as a mere epitome of earlier works, it is valued little by modern historians except as evidence about other Byzantine writers.

== Editions ==
- Mariev, Sergei (ed.). Ioannis Antiocheni fragmenta quae supersunt omnia. Corpus Fontium Historiae Byzantinae – Series Berolinensis, Volume 47. De Gruyter, 2008. doi:10.1515/9783110210316. Contains Greek text with English translation.
