= Leontius (usurper) =

5th-century Byzantine general and rebel leader

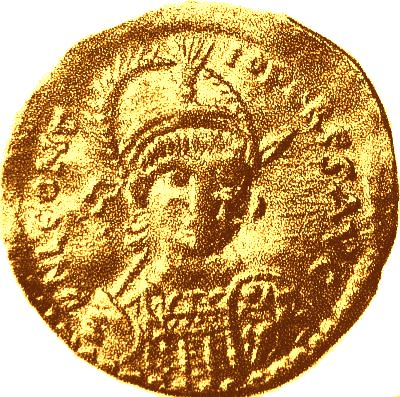
- Solidus of Leontius marked d·n· leontio perps· aug·

Roman emperor
- Reign: 19 July 484 – 488 (against Zeno)
- Coronation: 19 July 484, Tarsus
- Predecessor: Marcianus
- Successor: Zeno
- Born: Chalcis (according to Theophanes)
- Died: 488; Seleucia on the Calycadnus
Regnal name
- Imperator Caesar Leontius Augustus

Leontius (Note: Leontius is sometimes enumerated as Leontius I, after the 7th-century emperor of the same name.Grierson 1993, p. 610British Museum Though Leontius was crowned by Verina, the empress of a preceding emperor, and minted coins of his own, he never successfully took the capital and is thus not normally counted or enumerated.Grierson 1993, p. 610) (Greek: Λεόντιος, romanized: Leóntios; died 488) was a general of the Eastern Roman Empire and claimant to the throne who led a rebellion against Emperor Zeno in 484–488.

== Biography ==
Leontius was of Syrian or Isaurian origin, coming from Dalisandus. Under Zeno he became magister militum per Thracias (Commander-in-chief of the Imperial army in Thrace).

In 484, the Roman general Illus broke off his relationship with Emperor Zeno. The emperor sent Leontius with an army against Illus, but Illus managed to persuade Leontius to go over to his side. Zeno was not popular with the people of Constantinople, a crucial part of Eastern Roman politics, because he was an Isaurian (although he might just as well have been Syrian as Theophanes points out directly) and as such he was considered a barbarian (which is why he had suffered an usurpation in 475/476 by Basiliscus); Illus, who also was an Isaurian, decided not to take it for himself but to raise Leontius to the throne.

Leontius's coronation took place in Tarsus on July 19, 484 – the day was chosen, following the advice of some astrologers, as a favourable day – at the hands of Empress Dowager Verina, who then sent a letter to the governors of the Diocese of the East and of the Diocese of Egypt suggesting they accept the usurper as emperor. Leontius was recognized in Antioch, where he entered July 27, and in some other places; he even had time to nominate officers (Note: Among these Justinian, an ex-honorary consul, who had followed Illus and Leontius in Antioch and soon after had been proclaimed comes sacrarum largitionum of the usurper.) and to mint coins, before facing the reaction of Zeno.

Zeno's army, composed of Roman and Ostrogothic troops under the command of Theodoric the Amal and John the Scythian, defeated the rebel army near Antioch (August 8). Illus and Leontius were forced to take refuge inside the fortress of Papurius, where the insurgents held out for four years. In 488 the fortress fell through treachery; Leontius was put to death, beheaded at Seleucia on the Calycadnus, and his head was sent to Zeno.

Since Illus and Leontius were both Chalcedonians, they gained the support of Callandion, patriarch of Antioch, but otherwise had little support. Also some pagans supported the revolt, among whom was the poet, philosopher, and soothsayer Pamprepius.

== Sources ==
- "Leontius II". The British Museum.
- Grierson, Philip (1993). Catalogue of the Byzantine Coins in the Dumbarton Oaks Collection and in the Whittemore Collection, 2: Phocas to Theodosius III, 602–717 (2nd ed.). Dumbarton Oaks. ISBN 0-88402-024-X.
- Hugh, Elton, "Leontius (AD 484–488)" , De Imperatoribur Romanis
- Martindale, John R.; Jones, A. H. M.; Morris, John, eds. (1971). The Prosopography of the Later Roman Empire: Volume I, AD 260–395. Cambridge: Cambridge University Press. ISBN 0-521-07233-6.
- Smith, William, "Illus", Dictionary of Greek and Roman Biography and Mythology.
- Treadgold, Warren T. (1997). A History of the Byzantine State and Society. Stanford University Press. pp. 161–164. ISBN 0-8047-2630-2.
- Trombley, Frank R., and John W. Watt, The Chronicle of Pseudo-Joshua the Stylite, Liverpool University Press, 2000, ISBN 0-85323-585-6, p. 14.
- Williams, Stephen, The Rome That Did Not Fall: the survival of the East in the fifth century, Routledge, 1999, ISBN 0-415-15403-0, p. 195.
