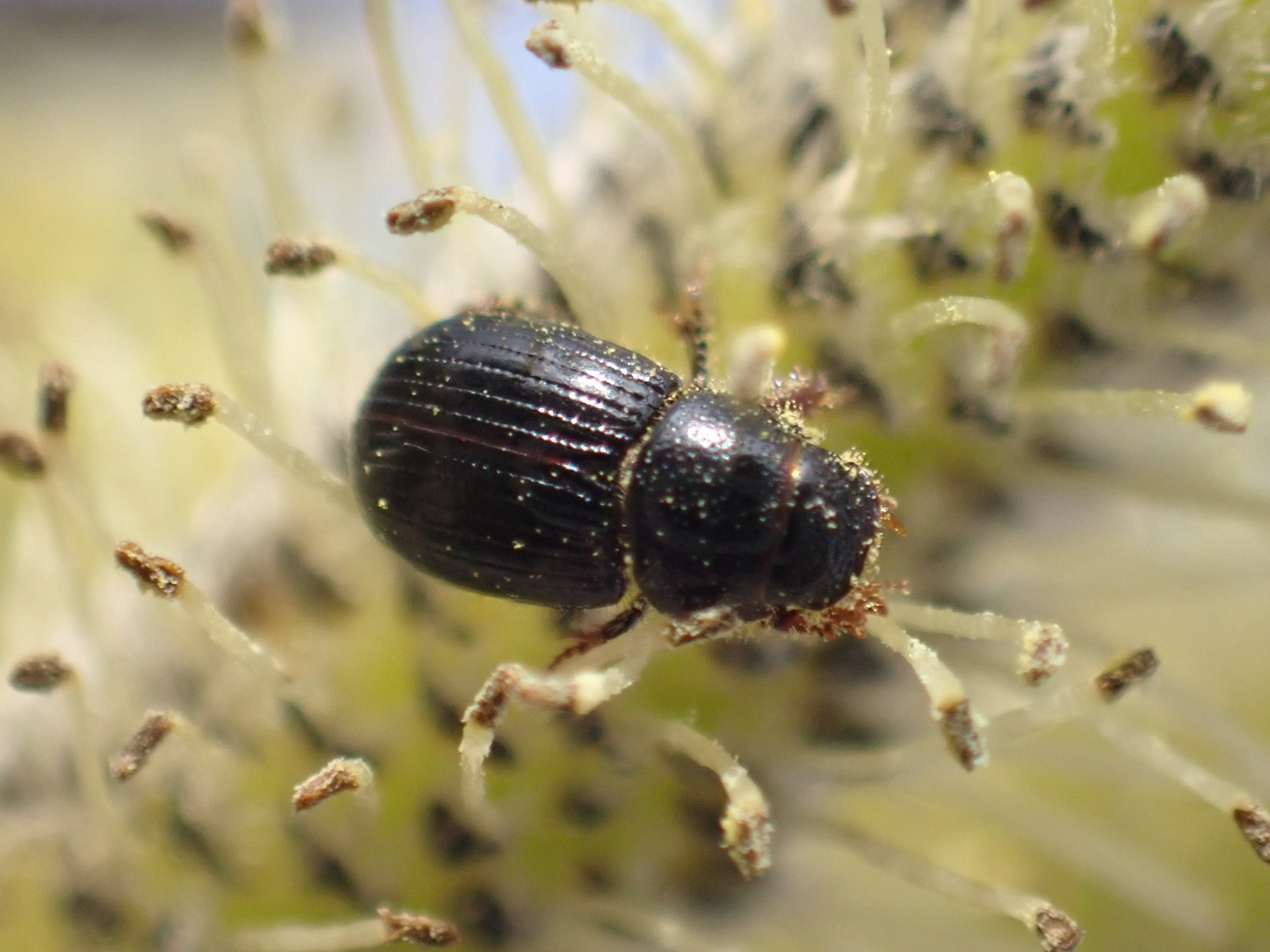
- Aegialia, Washington

Scientific classification
- Kingdom: Animalia
- Phylum: Arthropoda
- Clade: Pancrustacea
- Class: Insecta
- Order: Coleoptera
- Suborder: Polyphaga
- Infraorder: Scarabaeiformia
- Family: Scarabaeidae
- Subfamily: Aegialiinae; Laporte, 1840

Tribes
- Aegialiini Castelnau, 1840; Saprinianini Nikolajev, 2011

= Aegialiinae =

Subfamily of beetles

Aegialiinae is a small subfamily of the family Scarabaeidae (scarab beetles). Historically the group has been treated as a tribe within a broad definition of the subfamily Aphodiinae.

== Genera ==
The following genera are members of the subfamily Aegialiinae.

- Tribe Aegialiini
  - Aegialia Latreille, 1807 (Palaearctic, Nearctic, Neotropical)
  - Caelius Lewis, 1895 (Nearctic, Palaearctic)
  - Micraegialia Brown, 1931 (the Nearctic)
  - Psammoporus Thomson, 1859 (Palaearctic, Nearctic)
  - Rhysothorax Bedel, 1911 (Palaearctic, Nearctic)
  - Silluvia Landin, 1949 (Palaearctic, Oriental)
  - † Archeopsammoporus Minkina, 2020 (Palaearctic, Fossil)
  - † Cretaegialia Nikolajev, 1993 (Fossil)
- Tribe Saprinianini
  - Amerisaprus Stebnicka & Skelley, 2003 (Neotropical)
  - Argeremazus Stebnicka & Dellacasa, 2003 (Neotropical)
  - Mimaegialia Nikolajev, 2007 (Neotropical)
  - Sapriniana Strand, 1916 (Australian)
