= Caelius Aconius Probianus =

Politician of the Western Roman Empire

Caelius Aconius Probianus (fl. 461–471) was a politician of the Western Roman Empire.

He was Praetorian prefect of Italy under Emperors Leo I and Libius Severus; considering that his successor Caecina Decius Basilius was in office in 463, Probianus' mandate lasted between 461 and 463. In 471, he held the consulship, chosen by the Western court of Emperor Anthemius, together with Eastern Emperor Leo.

As attested by his name, he was related to the Aconii Catullini family, and, probably, to Aconia Fabia Paulina.

Political offices
Preceded by Messius Phoebus Severus, Flavius Iordanes	Consul of the Roman Empire; 471 with Imp. Caes. Fl. Valerius Leo Augustus IV	Succeeded by Fl. Rufius Postumius Festus, Fl. Marcian
