= Caelius (beetle) =

Scientific classification
- Kingdom: Animalia
- Phylum: Arthropoda
- Clade: Pancrustacea
- Class: Insecta
- Order: Coleoptera
- Suborder: Polyphaga
- Infraorder: Scarabaeiformia
- Family: Scarabaeidae
- Subfamily: Aegialiinae
- Tribe: Aegialiini
- Genus: Caelius; Lewis, 1895

Synonyms
- Aegialia (Leptaegialia) Brown, 1931

Genus of beetles

Caelius is a genus of beetles of the family Scarabaeidae.

== Species ==
- Caelius browni (Saylor, 1934)
- Caelius denticollis Lewis, 1895
- Caelius humeralis (Brown, 1931)
- Caelius montanus (Brown, 1931)
- Caelius rufescens (Horn, 1887)
