= Papurius =

Papurius or Papyrius was a fortress in Cilicia Campestris, near Tarsus.

It was in this fortress that the usurper Marcian was held prisoner after his failed revolt in 479, and where Leontius and his general and king-maker Illus were besieged between 484 and 488 by the army of Emperor Zeno.

== Sources ==
- "Papyrii", in Hazlitt, The Classical Gazetteer, 1851, p. 261^{[usurped]}.
