= Illus =

Roman general and rebel leader

Flavius Illus (Ancient Greek: Ἴλλους or Ἰλλοῦς; died 488) was a Roman general who played an important role in the reigns of the Eastern Emperors Zeno and Basiliscus.

Illus supported the revolt of Basiliscus against Zeno and switched sides to support the return of Zeno (475–476). Illus served Zeno well, defeating the usurper Marcianus, but came into conflict with the Dowager Empress Verina, and supported the revolt of Leontius. The rebellion failed, and Illus was killed.

== Origins ==
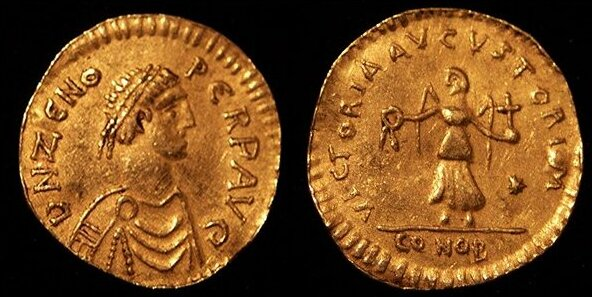
Tremissis issued by Emperor Zeno. Illus played an important role in Zeno's reign by first supporting a usurper, Basiliscus, then helping Zeno regain the purple and defeat another usurper (Marcianus), and finally creating and supporting a third usurper: Leontius.

Illus (Ancient Greek: Ἴλλους or Ἰλλοῦς) was an Isaurian, but the time and place of his birth are unknown; he had a brother, called Trocundes. Illus is said to have held various offices under the Emperor Leo I (457–474), and to have been an intimate friend of Zeno, apparently before his accession. John Malalas considered Illus an uncle of Zeno. We first read of him in Zeno's reign, at a time during which he was hostile to Zeno.

== Under Basiliscus ==
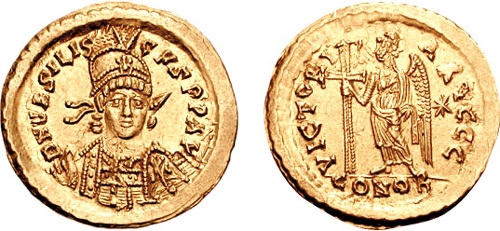
Solidus issued by Basiliscus. Basiliscus was the brother of Verina, the widow of Emperor Leo I. With the help of his sister and others, Illus among them, he forced Emperor Zeno to flee from Constantinople and seized the imperial throne. His rule however was short-lived since he alienated the Church of Constantinople by displaying Monophysite sympathies.

Basiliscus, brother of Dowager Empress Verina, the widow of Leo, had expelled Zeno from Constantinople in 475 and sent an army in pursuit of him under Illus and his brother Trocundes into Isauria, where Zeno had taken refuge. The brothers defeated the fugitive emperor (July 476) and blockaded him on a hill, ironically named "Constantinople" by the locals. Illus also captured Zeno's brother, Longinus, as a tool to keep Zeno under control.

During the blockade, Illus and Trocundes were secretly encouraged by the Senate in Constantinople to support Zeno against Basiliscus with whom they had had a dispute; Illus was discontented with the usurper for permitting the killing of the Isaurians who remained in the capital after Zeno's flight. That persuaded Illus and Trocundes by the promises and gifts of Zeno to embrace his side and to march with united forces towards the capital. At Nicaea, in Bithynia, they were met by the troops of Basiliscus under his nephew General Armatus, but he too was overcome and Basiliscus, forsaken by his supporters, was dethroned and put to death (477).

== Against Marcianus ==
Illus was sole consul in 478, and in 479, he was instrumental in crushing the dangerous revolt of Marcianus, grandson of the Byzantine emperor Marcian and son of Anthemius, emperor of the West. Marcianus had married Leontia, daughter of the late Emperor Leo by Verina, and sister of Ariadne, Zeno's wife. His revolt took place at Constantinople, where he defeated the troops of Zeno with the support of the mob and besieged him in the palace. For a moment Illus wavered, but his failing courage or fidelity was restored by the assurances of an Egyptian soothsayer whom he patronised. Marcianus's forces were corrupted by Illus, and Marcianus with his brothers Procopius and Romulus, was taken. The brothers escaped, but Marcianus was sent, either to Tarsus in Cilicia, and made a priest in the church there, or to the foot of Papurius, or Papyrius, a stronghold in Isauria, then used as a state prison.

Trocundes, the brother of Illus, was consul 482, and Illus enjoyed the dignities of patricius and magister officiorum. He is said to have employed his power and influence well, and to have rendered good service to the state in peace as well as in war. He assiduously cultivated science and literature.

== Patronage of Pamprepius and conflict with Verina ==
It was perhaps his literary predilections that made him the friend and patron of Pamprepius for whom he obtained a salary from the public revenue and to whom also he made an allowance from his private resources. Pamprepius was a native of Thebes, or, according to others, of Panopolis in Egypt, an avowed heathen, and eminent as a poet, a grammarian, and especially for his skill in divining the future. Pamprepius was hated both by Zeno and by the dowager empress Verina, and during the absence of Illus, who had gone on some business into Isauria, they banished him on a charge of attempting to divine events in favour of Illus and against the emperor. Illus, knowing that his intimacy with him had been the real cause of his banishment, received him into his household, and, on his return to the capital, took him with him. The date of these events is doubtful: it is possible that they occurred before Marcian's revolt, though a later date is on the whole more probable.

Zeno was prone to jealousy and so it is not surprising that the commanding position and popular favour of Illus rendered him an object of suspicion and that the emperor in various ways sought to rid himself of him. The ambitious Verina was also his enemy and plotted against his life. The assassin whom she employed, an Alan, is said to have wounded Illus. This is doubtful because historians may have confounded her plot with a later one by her daughter Ariadne. At any rate, Verina's attempt failed. Zeno, equally jealous of her and of Illus, banished her at the insistence of the latter, and confined her in the fort of Papurius. There is some doubt as to the time of these events. Candidus places her banishment before the revolt of Marcian, and Theodore Lector attributes its cause to her part in the revolt of Basiliscus.

It is not unlikely that she was banished twice, once before Marcian's revolt, for her connections with Basiliscus, and again after Marcian's revolt, for her plot against Illus. From prison she managed to get Ariadne to plead for her release, first to Zeno, and then to Illus, to whom the emperor had referred her. Illus not only refused her request, but also charged her with wishing to place another person on her husband's throne. This irritated her and she, like her mother, attempted to assassinate Illus. Jordanes ascribes her hatred to another cause: he says that Illus had infused jealous suspicions into Zeno's mind which had led Zeno to attempt her life, and that her knowledge of these things stimulated her to revenge. The assassin whom she employed failed to kill Illus, but cut off his ear in the attempt. The assassin was taken, and Zeno, who appears to have been privy to the affair, was unable to prevent his execution.

== Usurpation of Leontius and death of Illus ==
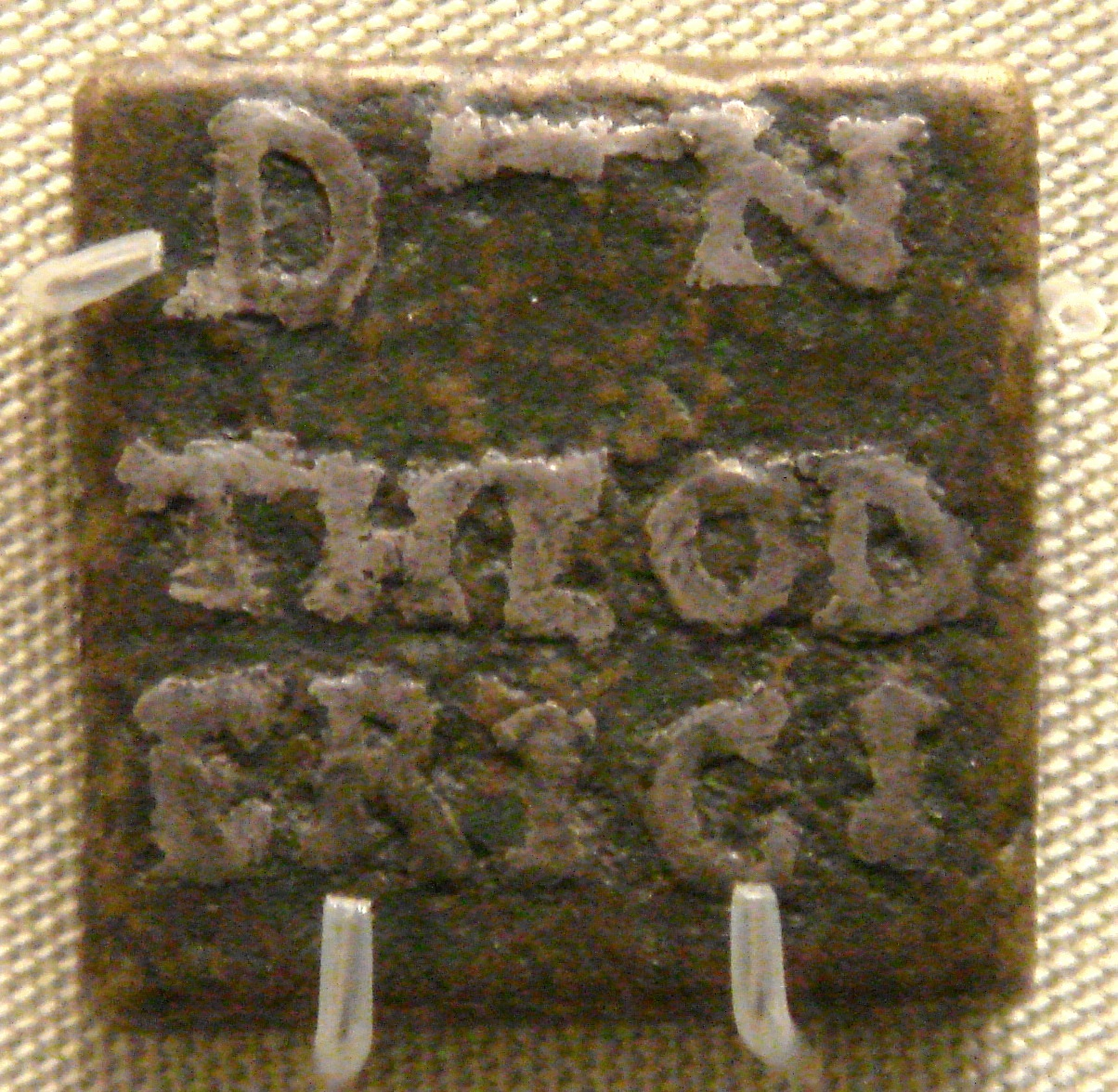
Bronze weight with the name of Theodoric the Great, King of the Ostrogoths and ruler of Italy. Theodoric served under Zeno, and was the leader of the army that besieged the fort of Papurius and captured and killed Illus' brother, Trocundes (484).

Illus, with his friend Pamprepius, now retired from court. He went first to Nicaea and then, on pretence of change of air to cure his wound, to the East, where he was made general of all the armies with the power of appointing the provincial officers. Marsus, an Isaurian officer of some repute, who had first introduced Pamprepius to Illus, and the patrician Leontius, another well-known officer of Syrian origin, either accompanied him or joined him in the East. Illus's brother Trocundes probably also joined them. Having traversed Asia Minor, they raised the standard of revolt in 483 or 484. Illus declared Leontius emperor, defeated the army of Zeno near Antioch, and, having drawn over the Isaurians to his party and captured Papurius, released Verina, and induced her to crown Leontius at Tarsus and send a circular letter to the imperial officers at Antioch, Egypt, and the East by which they were prevailed upon to join Illus. This important service did not prevent Illus from sending Verina back to Papurius, where she soon after closed her restless life.

In 485 Zeno sent a fresh army against the rebels, which was said to have consisted of Macedonians and Scythians (Tillemont speculates, not unreasonably, that these were Ostrogoths) under John the Hunchback, or, more probably, John the Scythian, and Theodoric the Amal, who was at this time consul. John defeated the rebels near Seleucia (which town of that name is not clear, perhaps the Isaurian Seleucia) and drove them into the fort of Papurius where he blockaded them. From this difficulty, Trocundes attempted to escape and gather forces for their relief, but was taken by the besiegers and put to death. Illus and Leontius were ignorant of his fate, and, encouraged by Pamprepius who gave them assurances of Trocundes's return and of ultimate victory, held out with great tenacity for over three years. In the fourth year, the death of Trocundes was discovered, and Illus, enraged at the deceit practised on him by Pamprepius, put him to death. The fort was soon after taken by the treachery of Trocundes's brother-in-law, who had been sent for the purpose from Constantinople by Zeno, and Illus and Leontius were beheaded (488) and their heads sent to the emperor.

Tillemont and Le Beau regard the revolt of Illus as an attempt to re-establish paganism, but for this view, there seems no foundation. It is not known if Illus was a pagan although Pamprepius was; it is more likely that Illus was a man of no fixed religious principles and that his revolt originated either in ambition or in a conviction that his only prospect of safety from the intrigues of his enemies and the suspicions of Zeno was the deposition of the emperor. It is remarkable that Edward Gibbon does not mention the name of Illus and scarcely notices his revolt.

== Footnotes ==
Preceded by Basiliscus II; Armatus in 476	Roman consul 478	Succeeded by Zeno III
