= 420s =

Decade

The 420s decade ran from January 1, 420, to December 31, 429.

== Events ==
=== By place ===
==== Roman Empire ====
- The Franks cross the Rhine and invade Northern Gaul. In Italia an army is prepared to campaign with Castinus as chief.
- Comes Asterius conducts campaign in Gallaecia and ends the usurpation of Maximus.
- A Roman army under command of vicar Maurocellus suffers a defeat at Braga in Gallaecia.

==== Persia ====
- Yazdegerd I dies after a 21-year reign, and is succeeded by his son Bahram V, who becomes head of the Persian Empire.
- Abdas, bishop of Susa, is accused of burning down one of the fire temples of Ahura Mazda, and after refusing to rebuild it, he is executed, under orders of Shah Yazdegerd I.

==== Asia ====
- July 10 – The Jin Dynasty ends in China. Liu Yu (Emperor Wu of Liu Song) becomes the first ruler of the Liu Song Dynasty. The capital of the dynasty is Nanjing.
- The Southern Dynasties begin in China.
- Guisin becomes king of the Korean kingdom of Baekje.
- The Gupta Empire reaches its peak territorial extent under Chandragupta II and his son Kumaragupta I.

=== By place ===
==== Roman Empire ====
- February 8 – Constantius III is appointed co-emperor (Augustus) with his ineffectual brother-in-law, Honorius, and becomes the real ruler of the Western Roman Empire.
- March 25 – Venice is founded at twelve o'clock noon (according to legend) with the dedication of the first church, San Giacomo, at the islet of Rialto (Italy).
- June 7 – Emperor Theodosius II marries Aelia Eudocia, a woman of Greek origin. The wedding is celebrated at Constantinople with chariot racing in the Hippodrome.
- September 2 – Constantius III dies suddenly of an illness; his wife Galla Placidia becomes, for the second time, a widow.
- Castinus campaign against the Franks: A Roman army under command of Castinus fights against the Franks in Northern Gaul.

==== Europe ====
- Rugila, chieftain of the Huns, attacks the dioceses of Dacia and Thrace (Balkans). Theodosius II allows Pannonian Ostrogoths to settle in Thrace, to defend the Danube frontier.
- The Franks conquer new territories in their kingdom and sack the old Roman capital Augusta Treverorum (modern Trier).

==== Persia ====
- Roman–Sassanid War: Theodosius II starts a war against the Sassanids, sending an expeditionary force under command of Ardaburius, and invades Mesopotamia.
- Autumn – Ardaburius devastates Arzanene (Armenia) and forces the Persians to retreat to Nisibis (Syria). King Bahram V allies himself with the Lakhmid Arabs of Hirah.

=== By place ===
==== Roman Empire ====
- End of the Roman–Sassanid War: Emperor Theodosius II signs a 100-year peace treaty with Persia after 2 years of war. He agrees to a status quo ante bellum ("the state in which things were before the war"), and both parties guarantee liberty of religion in their territories.
- March 3 – Theodosius II issues a law to form provisions in peacetime. He instructs landowners leasing towers in the Theodosian Walls to assist with the build-up of emergency goods. Theodosius pays an annual tribute of 350 pounds of gold to the Huns in order to buy peace.
- Theodosius II receives a statue at Hebdomon, military parade ground on the shores of the Propontis, just outside Constantinople. On its base (fragments are now in the Istanbul Archaeology Museum), an inscription praises him as “everywhere and forever victorious.”
- The walls of Rome's Flavian Amphitheater (Colosseum) crack during an earthquake.
- Vandal war: The Roman commander-in-chief Castinus leads a defeat against the Vandals at Baetica.

==== Europe ====
- The Roman army invades Gaul; they capture and execute the Frankish king Theudemeres with his family.

==== Asia ====
- Shao Di, age 16, eldest son of Wu Di, succeeds his father as emperor of the Liu Song dynasty (China).

=== By topic ===
==== Art ====
- Petrus, bishop of Illyria, starts construction of the Church of Santa Sabina (approximate date).

==== Religion ====
- September 4 – Pope Boniface I dies after a 4-year reign that was interrupted for 15 weeks, by the faction of the antipope Eulalius. He is succeeded by Celestine I as the 43rd pope.
- Approximate date – A monastic community is established at the Maijishan Grottoes.

=== By place ===
==== Roman Empire ====
- Early spring – Roman empress Galla Placidia departs with her children Grata Honoria and Valentinian to the court of Constantinople.
- August 15 – Emperor Honorius, age 38, dies at Ravenna of dropsy, perhaps pulmonary edema. With no children to claim the throne, Joannes, primicerius notariorum ("chief notary", head of the civil service), seizes the throne of the Western Roman Empire, and is declared emperor. Among his supporters are Flavius Aetius, Roman general (magister militum). Joannes' rule is accepted in the dioceses of Gaul, Hispania and Italia, but not in Africa.
- Winter – Emperor Theodosius II refuses to recognize Joannes as emperor, and prepares for war. He mobilizes an expeditionary force under command of Ardaburius, and his son Flavius Aspar.

=== By topic ===
==== Religion ====
- Theodoret becomes bishop of Cyrrhus (Syria). He converts more than 1,000 Marcionites in his diocese.

=== By place ===
==== Roman Empire ====
- April 22 – Flavius Anthemius Isidorus becomes the new Praetorian prefect of Illyricum, comprising most of Greece and Serbia, taking office at the capital, Sirmium (now Sremska Mitrovica in Serbia).
- October 23 – Emperor Theodosius II nominates his cousin Valentinian, age 5, the imperial title nobilissimus Caesar ("most noble") of the Western Roman Empire. Valentinian is betrothed to Theodosius's own daughter Licinia Eudoxia, who is only 2 years old.
- Roman usurper Joannes sends Flavius Aetius, governor of the Palace (cura palatii), to the Huns to ask for their assistance. After negotiating, he returns to Italy with a large force.
- Winter – A Roman army under the command of Ardaburius leaves Thessalonica (modern Central Macedonia) and marches for Northern Italy, where they make their base at Aquileia.

==== China ====
- July 7 – (Jing'ping era, 2nd year, 5th month (wǔyuè), the yi'you day) Emperor Shao of the Liu Song dynasty of China, is deposed by government ministers Xu Xianzhi and Fu Liang, who install his younger brother Prince Liu Yilong as the new Emperor.
- August 4 – (Jing'ping era, 2nd year, 6th month ( liùyuè), the guichou day) Former Emperor Shao of China, exiled to Suzhou is murdered by an assassin.
- September 17 – (Yuanjia era, 1st year, 8th month (bāyuè), dingyou day) Prince Liu Yilong is formally enthroned as the Emperor Wen of Song of China at its capital in Jiankang.

=== Religion ===
- Church of the East declares itself independent, under Catholicos of the East Dadisho.

=== By place ===
==== Roman Empire ====
- Roman civil war: Summer – Joannes, Roman usurper, is defeated at the fortified city of Ravenna and brought to Aquileia. After a humiliating parade on a donkey and the insults of the populace, he is executed.
- October 23 – Valentinian III, six-year-old son of Galla Placidia, is installed as emperor (Augustus) of the Western Roman Empire. Real power is in the hands of his mother who becomes a regent.
- Flavius Aetius leads a force of Huns (60,000 men) into Northern Italy. He reaches a compromise with Placidia, in return for obtaining the rank commander-in-chief (magister militum) in Gaul.
- The Huns advance unopposed on Constantinople, but are halted by a plague that decimates their hordes (see 433).

==== Israel ====
- After death of Gamaliel VI, the Sanhedrin is disbanded by the Roman Empire.

=== By topic ===
==== Arts and Sciences ====
- c. 425–426 – Mausoleum of Galla Placidia is built.

==== Education ====
- February 27 – The University of Constantinople is founded by emperor Theodosius II at the urging of his wife Aelia Eudocia.

==== Religion ====
- Buddhism begins to spread to Southeast Asia.

=== By place ===
==== Europe ====
- Flavius Aetius, Roman general (magister militum), ends the Gothic revolt of Theodoric I in southern Gaul.
- Rex Flavius Gundericus of the Vandals accepts the request of the Alans in Hispania to become their ruler (approximate date).

==== Mesoamerica ====
- K'inich Yax K'uk' Mo' becomes the founder of the pre-Columbian Maya civilization at Copán (modern Honduras).

==== Religion ====
- Augustine of Hippo publishes the De Civitate Dei, City of God.
- Sisinnius becomes Archbishop of Constantinople.

=== By place ===
==== Roman Empire ====
- Bonifacius, Roman governor (Last of the Romans), revolts in Africa against Emperor Valentinian III. Under the influence of Aetius, he is convicted of treason by empress-mother Galla Placidia.

==== Europe ====
- The Roman province of Pannonia Prima is finally assimilated into the Hunnic Empire.

==== Asia ====
- The Ephthalites (White Huns) invade Western Asia and reduce the Sasanian Empire threat to the Eastern Roman Empire. King Bahram V sends an expeditionary force into Khorasan.
- King Jangsu transfers the Goguryeo capital from Gungnae City (modern Ji'an, Jilin) on the banks of the Yalu River to Pyongyang (modern Korea).
- Biyu becomes king of the Korean kingdom of Baekje.

=== By place ===
==== Roman Empire ====
- Flavius Felix is elected consul for the Western Empire and issues consular diptychs during his political office.
- Flavius Aetius gains appointment as master of both services (magister militum praesentalis), after gaining victories in Gaul over Visigoth and Frankish forces.

==== Europe ====
- King Gunderic, age 49, dies after a reign of 21 years, and is succeeded by his half-brother Genseric. He is styled with the title Rex Wandalorum et Alanorum ("King of the Vandals and Alans"). Genseric increases his power and wealth in the residence of the province of Hispania Baetica (Southern Spain).
- King Vortigern invites a number of Germanic warriors to aid him in consolidating his position in Britain, according to the Historia Brittonum. He hires Saxons who are probably settled in Kent as mercenaries to fight against the Picts and the Scots beyond Hadrian's Wall.
- Frankish War (428): Commander-in-chief of the Roman army Aetius put an end to the invasion of Chlodio, king of the Salian Franks in Northern Gaul.

==== Asia ====
- Artaxias IV, last king of Greater Armenia, is deposed by Bahram V. The Arshakuni Dynasty ends and the kingdom becomes a province of the Persian Empire.

=== By topic ===
==== Astronomy ====
- October 26 – The planet Venus occults the planet Jupiter.

==== Religion ====
- April 10 – Nestorius is made patriarch of Constantinople. He preaches a new doctrine, that will be called Nestorianism. It makes a distinction between the divine and human natures of Jesus, but comes under immediate attack from Pope Celestine I, and Cyril of Alexandria.
- Hydatius becomes bishop of Aquae Flaviae in Gallaecia (modern Chaves) in Portugal.
- John succeeds Theodotus as patriarch of Antioch, and gives his support to Nestorius.
- Euthymius the Great builds a monastery in Palestine, near the Dead Sea.

=== By place ===
==== Roman Empire ====
- Spring – The Vandals, led by Genseric ("Caesar King"), invade North Africa. They land with a force of 80,000 men including Alans, and Germanic tribesmen with their families from the Iberian Peninsula, across the narrow Strait of Gibraltar. The Vandal fleet raids the coasts of the Mediterranean Sea, and blockades the grain and oil supply to Italy.
- Genseric seizes lands from the Berbers and destroys church buildings all over Mauretania. He goes on a rampage forcing Bonifacius, Roman governor, to retreat to the fortified coastal town of Hippo Regius (modern Annaba).
- Bonifacius, weakened by the civil war against empress Galla Placidia, sues for peace and is elevated to the rank of supreme commander (magister militum) of Africa.
- Emperor Theodosius II starts to reform the Codex Theodosianus in Constantinople. He establishes a committee to codify all Roman laws. All funds raised by Jews to support schools have to be turned over to the state treasury.
- The Temple of Goddess Athena on the Acropolis of Athens is sacked. Athenian Pagans are persecuted.

=== By topic ===
==== Religion ====
- Pope Celestine I dispatches two bishops from Gaul, Germanus of Auxerre and Lupus of Troyes to Britain combat the Pelagian heresy.
- Hilary succeeds his kinsman Honoratus and becomes archbishop of Arles.
- Domnus II, future patriarch of Antioch, is ordained as a deacon.

== Births ==
420

- Anthemius, emperor of the Western Roman Empire
- Ecdicius, Roman general (magister militum)
- Euric, king of the Visigoths (d. 484)
- Libius Severus, emperor of the Western Roman Empire
- Majorian, emperor of the Western Roman Empire
- Palladius, caesar and son of Petronius Maximus
- Valamir, king of the Ostrogoths (he is also thought to have been born in 425 AD)
- Yuan Can, high official of the Liu Song Dynasty (d. 477)

422

- August 8 – Casper, ruler of the Maya city of Palenque
- Genevieve, patron saint of Paris (approximate date)
- Licinia Eudoxia, Roman empress (d. 493)

423

- Theodosius the Cenobiarch, monk and founder of the Monastery of St. Theodosius (approximate date)

425

- Iamblichus, Syrian philosopher
- Zeno, Byzantine Emperor (approximate date)

426

- Liu Shao, emperor of the Liu Song Dynasty (d. 453)

427

- Erbin of Dumnonia, Brythonic king (approximate date)
- Qi Gaodi, Chinese emperor of the Southern Qi Dynasty (d. 482)
- Wang Xianyuan, empress and wife of Song Xiaowudi (d. 464)

428

- Tuoba Huang, prince of the Xianbei state Northern Wei (d. 451)

429

- Liu Jun, prince of the Liu Song dynasty (d. 453)
- Zu Chongzhi, Chinese mathematician (d. 500)

== Deaths ==
420

- January 21 – Yazdegerd I, king of the Sassanid Empire
- February 26 – Saint Porphyry, bishop of Gaza (Palestine)
- September 30 – Saint Jerome, priest and translator of the Bible
- Saint Abdas, bishop of Susa (Iran)
- Li Xin, duke of the Chinese state Western Liang
- Orosius, Christian historian and theologian (approximate date)
- Pelagius, British monk (approximate date)
- Yao, empress consort and wife of Mingyuan

421

- September 2 – Constantius III, emperor of the Western Roman Empire
- Jin Gongdi, last emperor of the Jin Dynasty (b. 386)
- Li Xun, ruler of the Chinese state Western Liang
- Mary of Egypt, patron saint (approximate date)
- Ravina I, rabbi (teacher) and Jewish Talmudist

422

- June 26 – Wu Di, emperor of the Liu Song dynasty (b. 363)
- September 4 – Pope Boniface I
- Abraham of Cyrrhus, Syrian hermit and bishop
- Fa-Hien, Chinese Buddhist monk and traveler (approximate date)
- Theudemeres, king of the Franks (approximate date)

423

- August 15 – Honorius, Roman Emperor (b. 384)
- December 23 – Ming Yuan Di, ruler of the Xianbei state Northern Wei (b. 392)
- Eulalius, antipope of Rome
- Tufa, Chinese princess and wife of Qifu Chipan
- Xiao Wenshou, empress dowager of the Liu Song dynasty (b. 343)

425

- November 5 – Atticus, archbishop of Constantinople
- Gamaliel VI, last Nasi (head of the Sanhedrin)
- Helian Bobo, emperor of the Chinese Xiongnu state Xia (born 381)
- Joannes, Roman usurper
- Mavia, Arab warrior-queen
- Sulpicius Severus, Christian writer (approximate date)
- Yax Nuun Ahiin I 15th Ajaw of Tikal (approximate date)

426

- Fu Liang, official of the Liu Song Dynasty (b. 374)
- Xie Hui, general of the Liu Song Dynasty (b. 390)
- Xu Xianzhi, official of the Liu Song Dynasty (b. 364)
- Zhang, empress dowager of the Liu Song Dynasty

427

- December 24 – Sisinnius I, archbishop of Constantinople
- Guisin, king of Baekje (Korea)
- Tao Qian, Chinese poet of the Eastern Jin Dynasty (b. 365)

428

- Gunderic, king of the Vandals and Alans (b. 379)
- Qifu Chipan, prince of the Xianbei state Western Qin
- Theodore of Mopsuestia, bishop and theologian

429

- January 6 – Honoratus, archbishop of Arles
- Heremigarius, military leader of the Suebi
