= Vandal war of 422 =

Military conflict in the Western Roman Empire

- Part of the Fall of the Western Roman Empire and Roman–Germanic Wars
- Diocese of Hispania met de Spaanse provincies
Date	422
Location	Hispania Baetica
Result	Vandal victory

Belligerents
West Roman Empire; Aquitanian Goths	Vandals; Alans

Commanders and leaders
Castinus; Bonifatius	Gunderic

Strength
5,000-15,000	

The Vandal War of 422 was a military conflict within the Western Roman Empire. The war took place in the province Baetica where the Romans went to war against the Vandals and Alans who had settled in the Diocese of Hispania since 409. The imperial army was led by general Castinus and was reinforced with Gothic auxiliary forces.

== Background ==
The diocese of Hispania was placed again under central Roman rule in 418 - after an impetuous period of uprisings and barbarian raids. In the four main provinces, the governing structure was restored, and, with the arrival of new units under comes Asterius, the Palatini army was brought back to strength. However, his Spanish campaign of 420 had not been sufficient to fully control the last rebellious Gallaecia province. Although it made an end to the usurpation of Maximus, the Vandals were able to flee and now made the province Baetica unsafe. It took until 422 before the empire started to send an army to put an end to this plague.

=== Rivalry at the imperial court ===
In September 421, Emperor Constantius III died who ruled the Western Empire together with Honorius. After his death, a struggle for power broke out within the government between Galla Placidia, the widow of Constantius III, and Honorius. According to historians, Castinus, as the main military commander during that period, acquired considerable influence from Emperor Honorius, and played a major role in opposing Placida. By the emperor he was appointed as magister utriusque militiae, i.e. commander-in-chief of the Roman army. This appointment came at the expense of Boniface, another influential officer, who - thanks to his good relationship with Placidia - had the crucial military post of comes rei militaris' in the diocese of Africa.

== Beginning ==
=== Campaign preparation ===
Castinus, as the highest officer, was intensively involved in the preparations for the campaign against the Vandals. From Palitani units of the main army group in Italy, an army force was formed to carry out the campaign and to strengthen it, Gothic foederati from Aquitaine were added. The Gothic troops supporting the expedition were led by local captains. Direct evidence that the Gothic rex Theodoric was involved in the events is missing.

Emperor Honorius formally placed Boniface in a position under Castinus, which would add Boniface's bucellari to the army. This appointment turned out to be a bad decision afterwards, because the two officers were each other's rivals and soon disagreements arose that led to Boniface leaving Ravenna and went to Africa. He ignored a call to return.

=== Strength of the armies ===
Without Boniface bucellari, Castinus left for Hispania in the course of 422. Even without the troops of Boniface, he had a large army under him that was deemed capable of facing the threat of Vandals and Alans. The classical sources do not give numbers, but historians such as Heather and Elton estimate the number between 10,000 and 15,000 soldiers (including Gothic foederati). That was big by the standards of the time, but certainly not a giant army like in the 4th century. The army of the Vandals and Alans must have been about the same size.

== The confrontation with the Vandals ==
According to Hydatius' report, Castinus' performance was initially prosperous. In Baetica (where exactly is not handed down) his troops managed to track down and meet the Vandals and Alans. He then prepared to give them the coup de grace in an open battle, but in the execution it went wrong. For unknown reasons, the Goths deserted. Heather allutes this to internal tensions within the Roman army caused by insufficient supplies, while Wijnendaele suggests that intent was at stake. By not sending grain, money or troops, Boniface tried to weaken the position of Castinus. Without the Gothic support, Castinus' troops were decisively defeated by the Vandals. Some historians suspect that the defeated Roman army retreated to Tarroco after the defeat, but there is no explicit evidence for this. They are based on Hodgkin who suggested that Castinus retreated towards Tarraconensis.

=== Peace talks ===
Despite the Roman defeat, a peace arrangement was established shortly after that which gave the Vandals permission to settle in Baetica. This treaty would not remain for long, because it fell apart in the years 425-426.

== Consequences and further events ==
After his failed campaign in Hispania, Castinus returned to Italy with heavy losses. His defeat meant a great loss of face. Nevertheless, he retained his position as commander-in-chief and thus belonged to the leading court party in Ravenna. Among historians, the view prevails that the mutual rivalry between Castinus and Boniface indirectly contributed to the failure of the campaign. Boniface's refusal to provide the necessary support from Africa (men and supplies) would have been crucial in this point of view.

The Roman defeat meant that their attempt to expel the Vandals from Baetica completely failed. The Vandals under their king rex Gunderic, strengthened their position in Southwest Hispania. They mainly retained control over Baetica and parts of Cathagensis. They settled mainly around the city of Seville (Hispalis). The largest city and strategically conveniently located. According to Hydatius, the Vandals remained active, but their position was uncertain. They had enemies: the Suevens in Gallaecia, the local Roman militias and groups such as the Bagauden. There were also food shortages and pressure from Germanic rivals. When Gunderic died in 428, he was succeeded by his half-brother Geiseric. This one made the radical decision to leave Hispania and cross over to Africa. Three years later, in 429, this crossing took place and a new war began that would eventually give the Vandals control over the Diocese of Africa.

== See also ==
- Roman civil war of 425
- Vandal conquest of Roman Africa

== Sources ==
- Prosper, Chronicon
- Olympiodorus, Fragments handed down at Zosimus and Photius.
- Isidore of Sevilla, Historia Gothorum, Vandalorum et Suevorum

== Bibliography used in the article ==
- Bury, J.B. (1923). History of the Later Roman Empire. Macmillan.
- Kulikowski, Michael (2004). Late Roman Spain and its cities. University Press.
- Heather, P. (2005). The Fall of the Roman Empire. Oxford University Press.
- Heather, P. (1996). The Goths. Oxford Blackwell Publishing.
- Wijnendaele, J.W.P. (2015). The last of the Romand: Bonifatius - Warlord and Comes Africae, Bloomsbury Academic.
- Wolfram, Herwig (1988). History of the Goths. Berkeley: University of California Press. ISBN 978-0-52005-259-8.
