= AD 420 =

420 in various calendars
- Gregorian calendar: 420; CDXX
- Ab urbe condita: 1173
- Assyrian calendar: 5170
- Balinese saka calendar: 341–342
- Bengali calendar: −174 – −173
- Berber calendar: 1370
- Buddhist calendar: 964
- Burmese calendar: −218
- Byzantine calendar: 5928–5929
- Chinese calendar: 己未年 (Earth Goat); 3117 or 2910 — to — 庚申年 (Metal Monkey); 3118 or 2911
- Coptic calendar: 136–137
- Discordian calendar: 1586
- Ethiopian calendar: 412–413
- Hebrew calendar: 4180–4181
- Hindu calendars
- Vikram Samvat: 476–477
- Shaka Samvat: 341–342
- Kali Yuga: 3520–3521
- Holocene calendar: 10420
- Iranian calendar: 202 BP – 201 BP
- Islamic calendar: 208 BH – 207 BH
- Javanese calendar: 304–305
- Julian calendar: 420; CDXX
- Korean calendar: 2753
- Minguo calendar: 1492 before ROC 民前1492年
- Nanakshahi calendar: −1048
- Seleucid era: 731/732 AG
- Thai solar calendar: 962–963
- Tibetan calendar: ས་མོ་ལུག་ལོ་ (female Earth-Sheep); 546 or 165 or −607 — to — ལྕགས་ཕོ་སྤྲེ་ལོ་ (male Iron-Monkey); 547 or 166 or −606

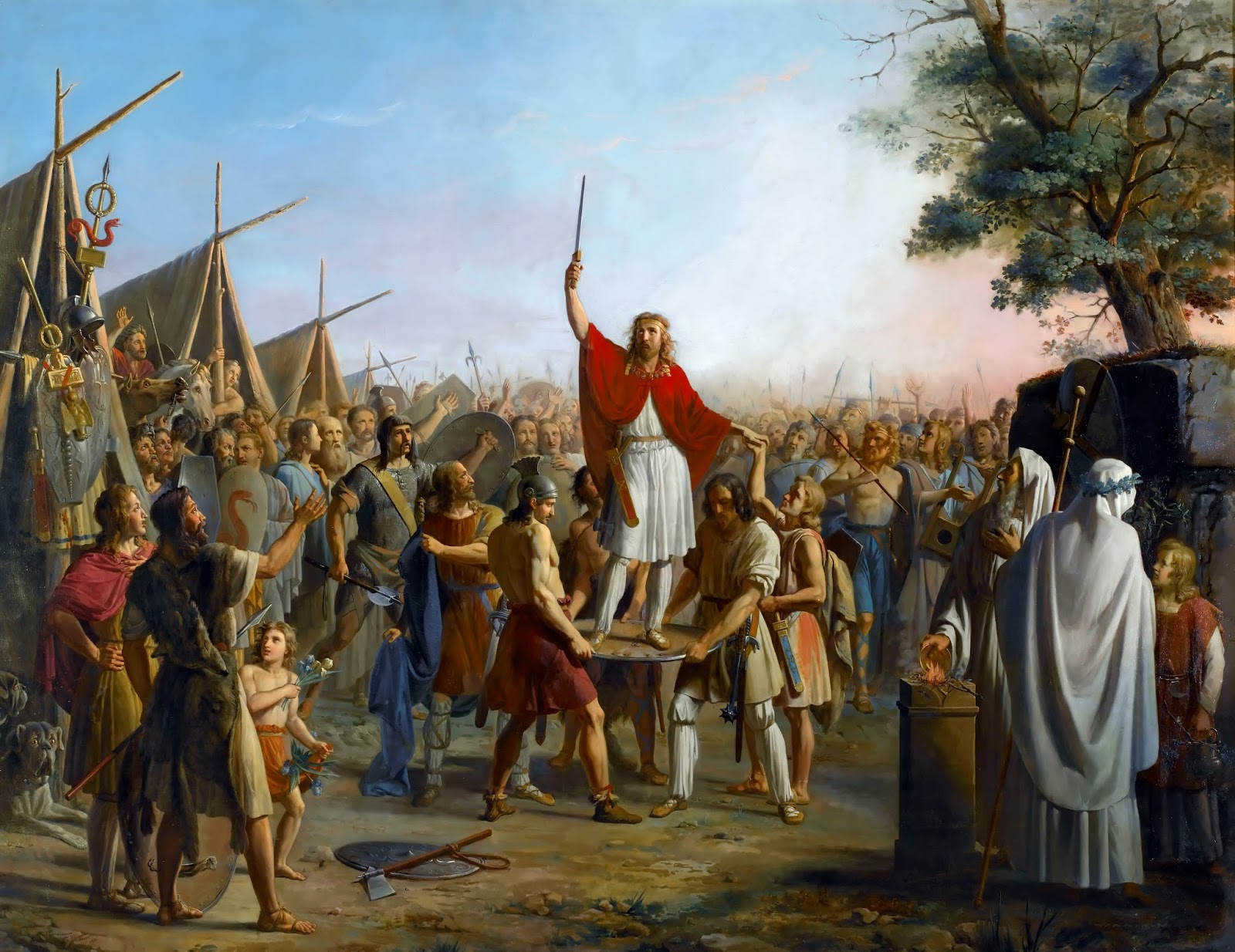
Pharamond is lifted on the shield by the Franks, by Pierre Révoil, 1841, and Michel Philibert Genod, 1845

Year 420 (CDXX) was a leap year starting on Thursday of the Julian calendar. At the time, it was known in the Roman Empire as the Year of the Consulship of Theodosius and Constantius (or, less frequently, year 1173 Ab urbe condita). The denomination 420 for this year has been used since the early medieval period, when the Anno Domini calendar era became the prevalent method in Europe for naming years.

== Events ==
=== By place ===
==== Roman Empire ====
- The Franks cross the Rhine and invade Northern Gaul. In Italia an army is prepared to campaign with Castinus as chief.
- Comes Asterius conducts campaign in Gallaecia and ends the usurpation of Maximus.
- A Roman army under command of vicar Maurocellus suffers a defeat at Braga in Gallaecia.

==== Persia ====
- Yazdegerd I dies after a 21-year reign, and is succeeded by his son Bahram V, who becomes head of the Persian Empire.
- Abdas, bishop of Susa, is accused of burning down one of the fire temples of Ahura Mazda, and after refusing to rebuild it, he is executed, under orders of Shah Yazdegerd I.

==== Asia ====
- July 10 – The Jin Dynasty ends in China. Liu Yu (Emperor Wu of Liu Song) becomes the first ruler of the Liu Song Dynasty. The capital of the dynasty is Nanjing.
- The Southern Dynasties begin in China.
- Guisin becomes king of the Korean kingdom of Baekje.
- The Gupta Empire reaches its peak territorial extent under Chandragupta II and his son Kumaragupta I.

== Births ==
- Anthemius, emperor of the Western Roman Empire
- Ecdicius, Roman general (magister militum)
- Euric, king of the Visigoths (d. 484)
- Libius Severus, emperor of the Western Roman Empire
- Majorian, emperor of the Western Roman Empire
- Palladius, caesar and son of Petronius Maximus
- Valamir, king of the Ostrogoths (he is also thought to have been born in 425 AD)
- Yuan Can, high official of the Liu Song Dynasty (d. 477)

== Deaths ==
- January 21 – Yazdegerd I, king of the Sassanid Empire
- February 26 – Saint Porphyry, bishop of Gaza (Palestine)
- September 30 – Saint Jerome, priest and translator of the Bible
- Saint Abdas, bishop of Susa (Iran)
- Li Xin, duke of the Chinese state Western Liang
- Orosius, Christian historian and theologian (approximate date)
- Pelagius, British monk (approximate date)
- Yao, empress consort and wife of Mingyuan
