= Frankish War (428) =

Short military conflict

- Part of the Fall of the Roman Empire and Roman–Germanic Wars
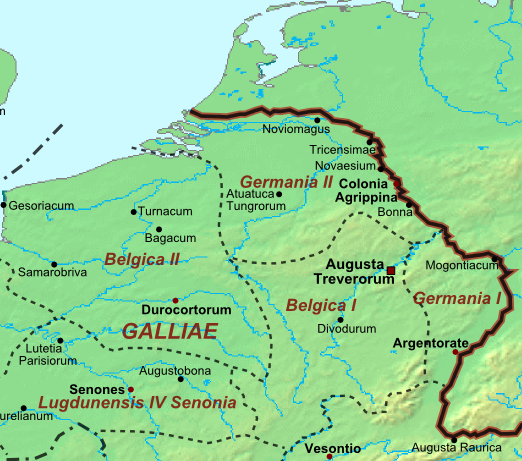
- Northern Gaul
Date	425
Location	Belgica Secunda and Germania Secunda
Result	Roman victory

Belligerents
Western Roman Empire	Frankish people

Commanders and leaders
Flavius Felix; Flavius Aetius	Chlodio

Strength
40,000	Unknown

Casualties and losses
Unknown	Unknown

The Frankish War was a short military conflict between the Frankish people and the West Roman Empire under Emperor Valentinian III. In this conflict, it can only be said with certainty that the Roman general Aetius was involved in it. The presence of King Chlodio of the Salians as captain of the Franks is an assumption and is not confirmed by contemporary sources. The war ended in a Roman victory.

== Background ==
Around 400, the Frankish people consisted of two subgroups, the Salian Franks and the Ripuarian Franks, of which the Salians resided within the Roman Empire as foederati and the Ripuarians lived near Cologne on the eastern bank of the Rhine; in the province Germania Secunda they delivered troops to the Limitanei in charge of guarding the Rhine border. During the crisis in which the Western Empire ended up as a result of the Rhine crossing and the civil war that broke out, both tribes supported the British usurpator Constantine III and after its decline the Gallic usurper Jovinus. The commander-in-Chief of the Western army Constantius III made an end to the civil war and restored central authority in Gaul. He concluded new treaties with the peoples on the Rhine border and thereby restored the bond with Emperor Honorius.

== The invasion of the Franks ==
According to Sulpicius Alexander, the Franks were led by regales, ("little kings"). No names of them are handed down from contemporary sources. Chlodio is the first king that was written about. Taking advantage of the weakening of Roman power caused by the Roman civil war of 427–429 between 427 and 429, the Franks invaded Belgica Secunda in northern Gaul and occupied the territory to the Somme. The armed forces conquered the Northern-Gall cities Tournai, Cambrai and Arras. His raid was successful because the Roman militias deployed against him were defeated or expelled. A real reaction from the Romans was not at first because the commander-in-chief of the Gallic field army had traveled to Ravenna, which is the most plausible reason why the Roman counterattack took some time.

== The campaign of Aetius ==
Finally a Roman army was brought against him under the command of Aetius, the Gallic commander-in-chief, comes et magister militum per Gallias. He was a former general of the deposed emperor Joannes and previously successfully put an end to the rebellion of Theodoric I in 426. When a crisis broke out as a result of the revolt comes Africanae Bonifatius in North-Africa, he stayed in Italy.

=== Aetius army force and victory ===
In addition to the Comitatenses, the Gallic field army, Aetius had access to a large section Hun soldiers, who were famous for their skill as ridden archers. It was a logical decision to quickly send the ride army of Aetius to Gaul to stop the advance of the Franks in the far north. Aetius himself led the army and defeated the Franks in 428. He then restored Roman power over part of the territory they had taken possession of.

== Sources and interpretation ==
The story of this war is extremely succinct. Only in three contemporary sources the conflict is mentioned: Philostorgius, Prosper and the Chronica Gallica of 452. Cassiodorus who reports about war that Aëtius carried out a massacre among the Franks is a later source.

Except that Aëtius achieved victory and made peace, the further course of this war is unknown. No place had been reported handed where battles against the Franks took place or it must have been Vicus Helenae. Notwithstanding that, there is more evidence that the fight at Vicus Helenae took place later. Prospers' story of the war is extremely summary and does not tell us which tribe was involved.

== Primary sources ==
- Philostorgius
- Prosper
- Chronica Gallica of 452
- Cassiodorus

== Secondary sources ==
- Demougeot, Émilienne (1988), L'Empire romain et les Barbares d'Occident, IV-VIIe siècle
- Kurth, Godefroit (1896), Clovis
- Lebecq, Stéphane (1990), Nouvelle histoire de la France médiévale, « Points. Histoire » (no 201), vol. 1 : Les origines franques, ve – ixe siècle, Paris: Éditions du Seuil
- Sivan, Hagith (2011), Galla Placidia: The Last Roman Empress, Oxford University Press, ISBN 9780195379129
- Wood, Ian (1974), The Merovingian Kingdoms 450 - 751
