= Gothic revolt of Theodoric I =

Gothic Revolt of Theodoric I
- Part of the Fall of the Roman Empire; Gothic Wars and Roman–Germanic Wars
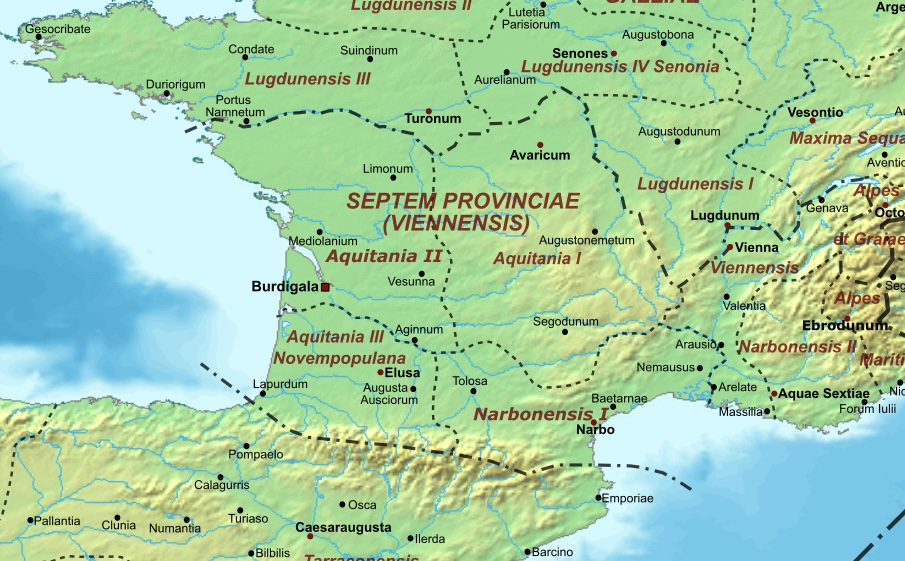
- Map of South-Gallia
Date	425–426
Location	South of France
Result	Roman victory

Belligerents
Western Roman Empire	Goths

Commanders and leaders
Flavius Aetius	Theodoric I

Strength
Unknown	Unknown

The Gothic revolt of Theodoric I was an uprising of the Gothic Foederati in Aquitaine (Western Roman Empire) during the regime of Emperor Valentinian III (425–455). That rebellion was led by Theodoric I, King of the Visigoths and took place in the South of France. The uprising took place between 425 and 426, in the period shortly after the death of usurpator John and was terminated by a military operation under the command of Aëtius.

== Cause ==
The cause of the uprising must be sought on the one hand in the settlement of the Goths in Gallia Aquitania close to the Gallic capital Arles by Constantius III and was intended to keep an eye on the senatorial nobility. On the other hand, the political situation of the empire underpinned the insurrection.

=== Visigothic Aquitaine ===
After the Goths campaigned in Spain for the Romans in the period 416-418 (Gothic war in Spain), they were assigned a settlement area by Emperor Honorius in 418 in the province of Gallia Aquitania with Toulouse as their capital. Main reason for the settlement was that Constantius III, the architect of the settlement treaty, considered the Gallic senatorial class a greater danger to imperial power in Ravenna than the Gothic presence. In the previous period he should have campaigned against a series of usurpers (including Constantine and Jovinus) who received much support from the Gallic elite. With the settlement of the Goths as potential forces close to the center of Gaul, he hoped to better control the senators. Nevertheless, with the establishment of the Goths, Constantius had created a new power group that sought more influence within late Roman Gaul. The Goths were part of the Roman state system, acted within that state system and tried to exert pressure and control as much as possible from within.

=== Political situation ===
Western Roman Empire about 425

With the death of Constantius III in 421 and of Honorius in 423, the Western Roman Empire ended up in a new crisis that would have major consequences for the relationship between imperial power and the army. Because the emperor was still a child, the western part of the empire was governed by mother Galla Placidia who was strongly under the influence of her generals. The Eastern Emperor Theodosius II (her cousin) also exerted great influence on her policies. There were several candidates who went to the position of commander-in-chief, which initiated a development that is described as the 'semi-privatization' of the Roman army. That situation made it possible for Theodoric I, the leader of the Gothic foederati, to realize his plans for more power. He emerged as an ambitious prince who acted in the same line as his infamous predecessors. The first signs of this ambition could already be seen during the Spanish campaign of 422 in which the Goths participated.

== Sources ==
History is extremely sparsely narrated about the course of Gothic-Roman relations in the period between 418 and 439. There are a number of events in which the Goths were involved, but cause and effect are missing. The little that has been written down is by Prosper and Hydatius. From 422, the Goths turn out to be disappointing allies, but their presence proved sufficient to keep the Gallic nobility calm. The Goths, on the other hand, needed a series of imperial expeditions to be restrained. In 425 they marched to Arles, but were stopped by Aetius.

=== The Gothic betrayal during the campaign in Spain ===
The first years of Theoderics' semi-autonomous reign went smoothly. In 418 he succeeded his father as king of the Visigoths in Aquitaine, who had died shortly before. After years of leading a wandering existence, the Goths were finally able to settle down. Under Roman rule they enjoyed many advantages, in return the Goths had to provide military assistance. These peaceful years came to an end with the death of the Western Roman fellow emperors Constantius III in 421.

The policies of the Western Roman Emperor Honorius had always relied heavily on the work of his brother-in-law Constantius, who had been appointed co-emperor seven months earlier. The disappearance of this mainstay mainly caused unrest within the army, with which Theoderic could take advantage. Two important generals Castinus and Bonefatius went to the army's supreme command, thus providing difficulties. Gothic Foederati accompanied them in 422 during a campaign against the Vandals in Baetica in southern Spain. According to chronicler Hydatius, the Goths worked militarily against the Romans and is said they caused the defeat for the Romans. Some historians assume that Theoderic withheld Castinus from the support of the Visigothic auxiliary troops, as a result of which he suffered a heavy defeat in the battle of Tarraco in Baetica against Gunderic, the king of the Vandals who thus became the undisputed masters of Hispania. Probably Theodoric worked together with Boniface.

== The uprising ==
With the death of Emperor Honorius in 423, a power struggle broke out in the Western Roman Empire that weakened the empire internally. The bulk of the army was in Italy and in Gaul the provincial prefect in Arles was killed during a revolt of his soldiers. In Italy, after Honortius' death, a new emperor emerged, John who had the support of the generals Castinus and Aetius. Now that most of the Roman army was staying elsewhere, Theodoric pushed aside Constantius' peace agreement and rebelled. Without encountering significant opposition, he took possession of all of Aquitaine and provided himself with access to the Mediterranean Sea. He then went up to the Arles to put pressure on the Romans. Some historians see this attempt as a declaration of loyalty to the Theodian dynasty in the hope that it would obtain a more favorable treaty.

In the summer of 425, John was overthrown by an Eastern Roman army, after which Valentinian III was installed as the new emperor. Three days after John was beheaded, Aetius arrived in Italy with a large army of Huns. Unaware of his execution, and after a brief skirmish with Aspar's army, Aëtius made peace. He accepted Valentinian III as emperor and was given the high position of praefectus praetorio per Gallia, entrusting him with the rule of Gaul and Spain. Aetius' appointment as chief executive in Gaul is seen as a maneuver by the new regime to keep potential troublemakers away from the central government. The newly appointed prefect left Italy with the army he already had and reinforced with large numbers of Huns as mercenaries. Accompanied with this huge army made Aetius an end to the revolt of the Gothic foederati.

=== Defeat against Aëtius ===
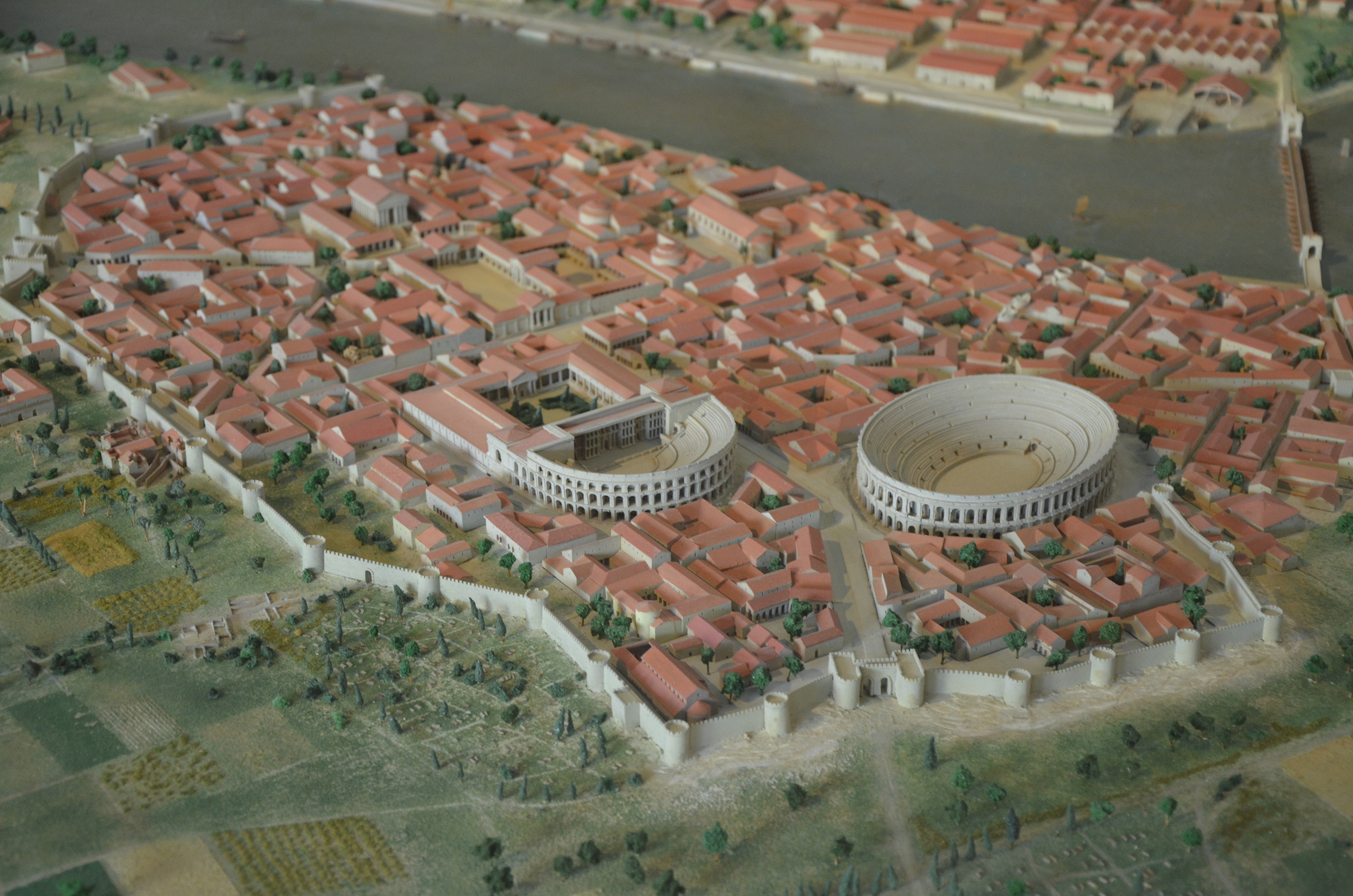
Model of the Roman city of Arelate (Arles)

Aëtius arrived in the spring of 426 at Arles that was besieged by Theodoric. It seems that the Goths fled when they became aware of Aetius's army. No mention of a battle is made in the surviving sources. Nevertheless, some historians assume that near the city has been fought and the Goths were undermining here. The result of Aetius's arrival is undisputed, the Goths were forced to retreat to Aquitaine.

== Aftermath ==
With the defeat against Aetius, the uprising came to an end. This was followed by peace talks in which the previously concluded treaty with the Romans was renewed, exchanging hostages back and forth. The later emperor Avitus was one of those hostages who stayed at the court of Theodoric. Here he met his sons and taught them.

With Aetius as Gallic prefect and from 429 as magister militum per Gallias, peace seems to have returned to southern France. The period after this until 435 passed without great incidents between the Visigoths and Romans. Nevertheless, Theodoric had not given up his quest for more power, because in 430 a Gothic army still marched to Arles to enforce more favorable conditions. This Gothic army was also defeated by Aetius, again not far from Arles. As far as is known, the Visigoths did not performed military duties in the Spanish provinces during this period.

Nevertheless, in 436 a large-scale conflict (the Gothic War of 436–439) arose between the Goths and Romans that was recorded as a bloody war. Because explanations for these hostilities are lacking, historians place these events in the great context of history.

== Appendix ==
Primary sources:

- Prosper
- Orosius
- Hydatius
- Sidonius Apollinaris

Secondary sources:

- Bury, J.B. (1889), History of the Later Roman Empire: From Arcadius to Irene (395 A.D. to 800 A.D.), vol. I, London: Macmillan
- Bury, J.B. (1923), "Settlement of the Vandals in Africa (A.D. 435‑442)", History of the Later Roman Empire: From the Death of Theodosius I. to the Death of Justinian (A.D. 395 to A.D. 565), vol. I, London: Macmillan
- Kulikowski, Michael (1997), The End of Roman Spain (PhD thesis), University of Toronto
- Matthews, John Frederick (1990) [1975], Western Aristocracies and Imperial Court AD 364 - 425, Oxford: Clarendon Press, ISBN 9780198148173
- Oost, Stewart I. (1968), Galla Placidia Augusta: A Biographical Essay, University of Chicago Press, ISBN 9780226630502
- Wijnendaele, Jeroen W.P. (2017), "'Warlordism' and the Disintegration of the Western Roman Army", in Hans van Wees (ed.), Circum Mare: Themes in Ancient Warfare, Mnemosyne Supplements, vol. 388, Brill, pp. 185–203, ISBN 9789004284852
- Hughes, Ian (2012). Aetius: Attila's Nemesis. Pen & Sword Military. ISBN 978-1848842793.
