= 427 =

427 in various calendars
- Gregorian calendar: 427; CDXXVII
- Ab urbe condita: 1180
- Assyrian calendar: 5177
- Balinese saka calendar: 348–349
- Bengali calendar: −167 – −166
- Berber calendar: 1377
- Buddhist calendar: 971
- Burmese calendar: −211
- Byzantine calendar: 5935–5936
- Chinese calendar: 丙寅年 (Fire Tiger); 3124 or 2917 — to — 丁卯年 (Fire Rabbit); 3125 or 2918
- Coptic calendar: 143–144
- Discordian calendar: 1593
- Ethiopian calendar: 419–420
- Hebrew calendar: 4187–4188
- Hindu calendars
- Vikram Samvat: 483–484
- Shaka Samvat: 348–349
- Kali Yuga: 3527–3528
- Holocene calendar: 10427
- Iranian calendar: 195 BP – 194 BP
- Islamic calendar: 201 BH – 200 BH
- Javanese calendar: 311–312
- Julian calendar: 427; CDXXVII
- Korean calendar: 2760
- Minguo calendar: 1485 before ROC 民前1485年
- Nanakshahi calendar: −1041
- Seleucid era: 738/739 AG
- Thai solar calendar: 969–970
- Tibetan calendar: མེ་ཕོ་སྟག་ལོ་ (male Fire-Tiger); 553 or 172 or −600 — to — མེ་མོ་ཡོས་ལོ་ (female Fire-Hare); 554 or 173 or −599

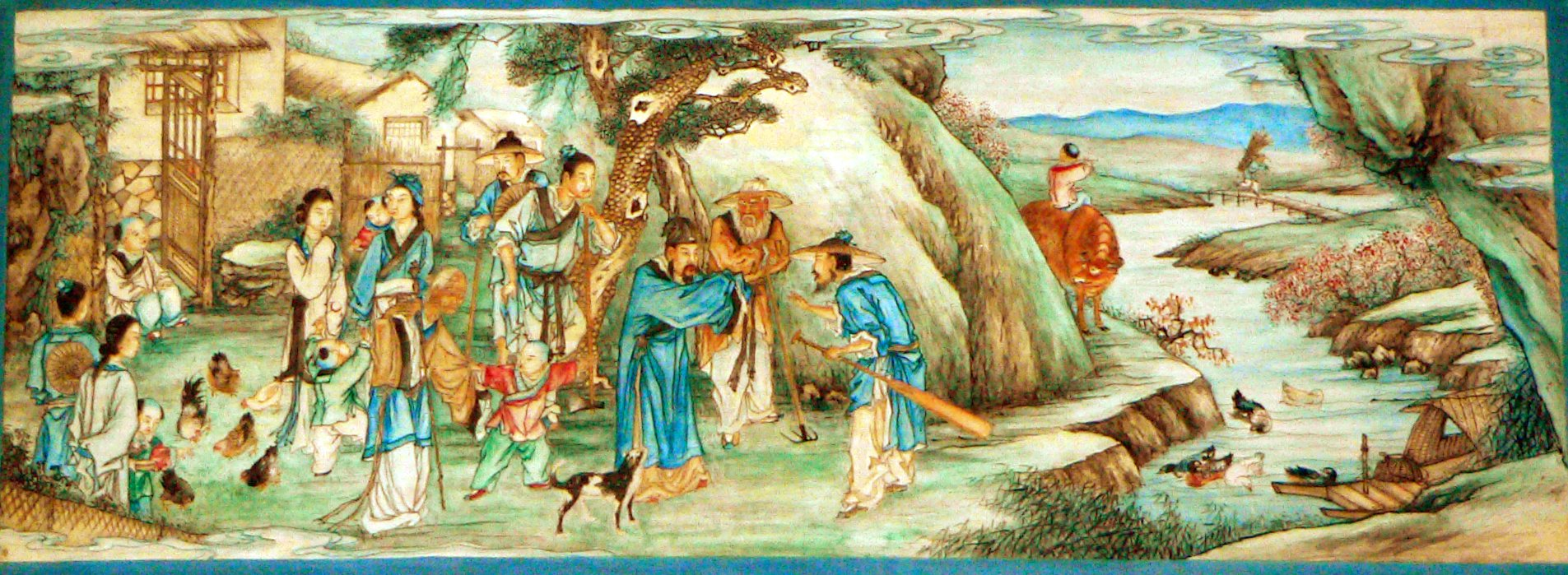
(The Tale of the) Peach Blossom Spring, by Tao Qian

Year 427 (CDXXVII) was a common year starting on Saturday of the Julian calendar. At the time, it was known as the Year of the Consulship of Hierius and Ardabur (or, less frequently, year 1180 Ab urbe condita). The denomination 427 for this year has been used since the early medieval period, when the Anno Domini calendar era became the prevalent method in Europe for naming years.

== Events ==
=== By place ===
==== Roman Empire ====
- Bonifacius, Roman governor (Last of the Romans), revolts in Africa against Emperor Valentinian III. Under the influence of Aetius, he is convicted of treason by empress-mother Galla Placidia.

==== Europe ====
- The Roman province of Pannonia Prima is finally assimilated into the Hunnic Empire.

==== Asia ====
- The Ephthalites (White Huns) invade Western Asia and reduce the Sasanian Empire threat to the Eastern Roman Empire. King Bahram V sends an expeditionary force into Khorasan.
- King Jangsu transfers the Goguryeo capital from Gungnae City (modern Ji'an, Jilin) on the banks of the Yalu River to Pyongyang (modern Korea).
- Biyu becomes king of the Korean kingdom of Baekje.

== Births ==
- Erbin of Dumnonia, Brythonic king (approximate date)
- Qi Gaodi, Chinese emperor of the Southern Qi Dynasty (d. 482)
- Wang Xianyuan, empress and wife of Song Xiaowudi (d. 464)

== Deaths ==
- December 24 – Sisinnius I, archbishop of Constantinople
- Guisin, king of Baekje (Korea)
- Tao Qian, Chinese poet of the Eastern Jin Dynasty (b. 365)
