= 422 =

422 in various calendars
- Gregorian calendar: 422; CDXXII
- Ab urbe condita: 1175
- Assyrian calendar: 5172
- Balinese saka calendar: 343–344
- Bengali calendar: −172 – −171
- Berber calendar: 1372
- Buddhist calendar: 966
- Burmese calendar: −216
- Byzantine calendar: 5930–5931
- Chinese calendar: 辛酉年 (Metal Rooster); 3119 or 2912 — to — 壬戌年 (Water Dog); 3120 or 2913
- Coptic calendar: 138–139
- Discordian calendar: 1588
- Ethiopian calendar: 414–415
- Hebrew calendar: 4182–4183
- Hindu calendars
- Vikram Samvat: 478–479
- Shaka Samvat: 343–344
- Kali Yuga: 3522–3523
- Holocene calendar: 10422
- Iranian calendar: 200 BP – 199 BP
- Islamic calendar: 206 BH – 205 BH
- Javanese calendar: 306–307
- Julian calendar: 422; CDXXII
- Korean calendar: 2755
- Minguo calendar: 1490 before ROC 民前1490年
- Nanakshahi calendar: −1046
- Seleucid era: 733/734 AG
- Thai solar calendar: 964–965
- Tibetan calendar: ལྕགས་མོ་བྱ་ལོ་ (female Iron-Bird); 548 or 167 or −605 — to — ཆུ་ཕོ་ཁྱི་ལོ་ (male Water-Dog); 549 or 168 or −604

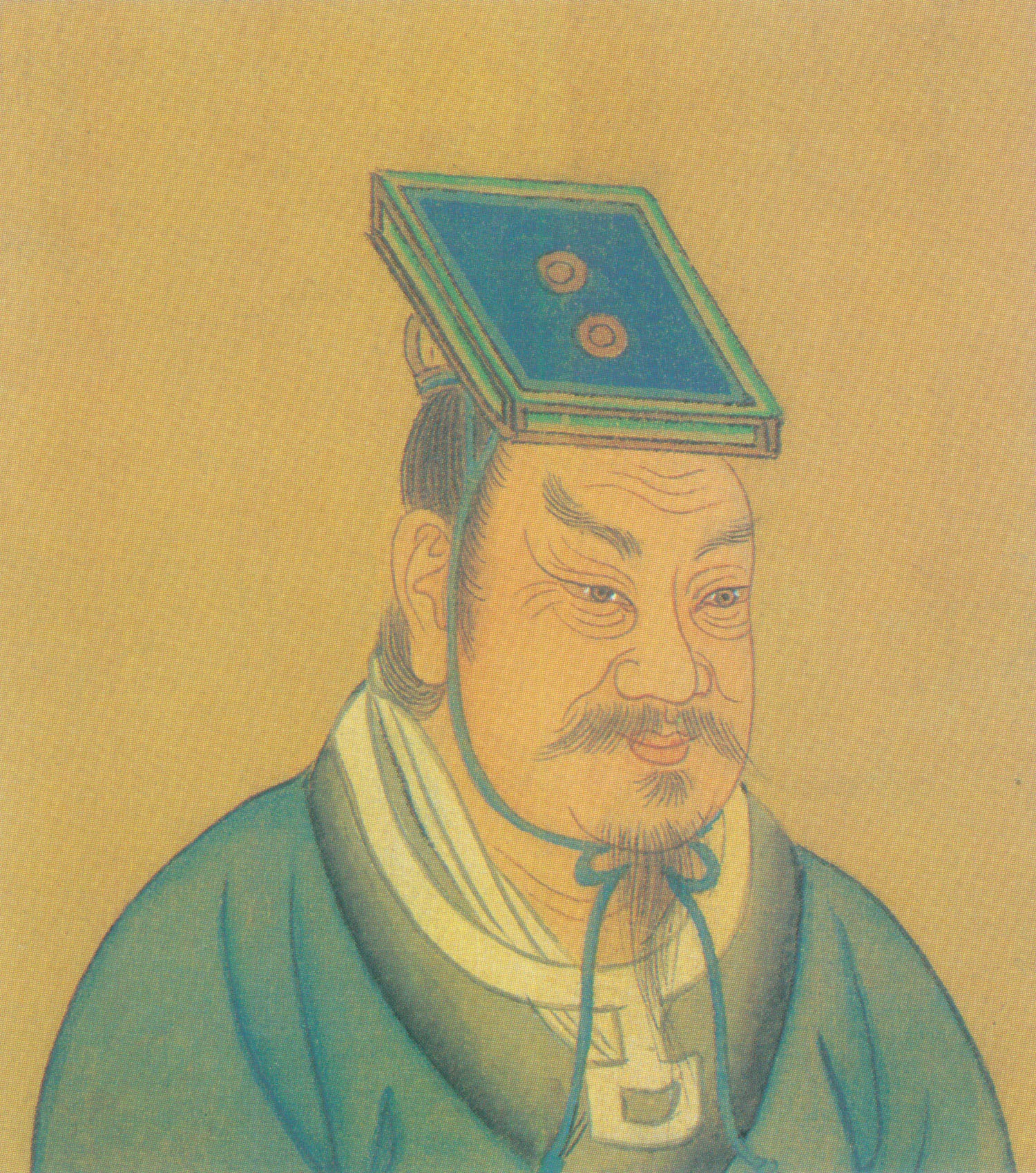
Emperor Wu of Liu Song (420–422)

Year 422 (CDXXII) was a common year starting on Sunday of the Julian calendar. At the time, it was known as the Year of the Consulship of Honorius and Theodosius (or, less frequently, year 1175 Ab urbe condita). The denomination 422 for this year has been used since the early medieval period, when the Anno Domini calendar era became the prevalent method in Europe for naming years.

== Events ==
=== By place ===
==== Roman Empire ====
- End of the Roman–Sassanid War: Emperor Theodosius II signs a 100-year peace treaty with Persia after 2 years of war. He agrees to a status quo ante bellum ("the state in which things were before the war"), and both parties guarantee liberty of religion in their territories.
- March 3 – Theodosius II issues a law to form provisions in peacetime. He instructs landowners leasing towers in the Theodosian Walls to assist with the build-up of emergency goods. Theodosius pays an annual tribute of 350 pounds of gold to the Huns in order to buy peace.
- Theodosius II receives a statue at Hebdomon, military parade ground on the shores of the Propontis, just outside Constantinople. On its base (fragments are now in the Istanbul Archaeology Museum), an inscription praises him as “everywhere and forever victorious.”
- The walls of Rome's Flavian Amphitheater (Colosseum) crack during an earthquake.
- Vandal war: The Roman commander-in-chief Castinus leads a defeat against the Vandals at Baetica.

==== Europe ====
- The Roman army invades Gaul; they capture and execute the Frankish king Theudemeres with his family.

==== Asia ====
- Shao Di, age 16, eldest son of Wu Di, succeeds his father as emperor of the Liu Song dynasty (China).

=== By topic ===
==== Art ====
- Petrus, bishop of Illyria, starts construction of the Church of Santa Sabina (approximate date).

==== Religion ====
- September 4 – Pope Boniface I dies after a 4-year reign that was interrupted for 15 weeks, by the faction of the antipope Eulalius. He is succeeded by Celestine I as the 43rd pope.
- Approximate date – A monastic community is established at the Maijishan Grottoes.

== Births ==
- August 8 – Casper, ruler of the Maya city of Palenque
- Genevieve, patron saint of Paris (approximate date)
- Licinia Eudoxia, Roman empress (d. 493)

== Deaths ==
- June 26 – Wu Di, emperor of the Liu Song dynasty (b. 363)
- September 4 – Pope Boniface I
- Abraham of Cyrrhus, Syrian hermit and bishop
- Fa-Hien, Chinese Buddhist monk and traveler (approximate date)
- Theudemeres, king of the Franks (approximate date)
