= Castinus' campaign against the Franks =

Castinus campaign against the Franks
- Part of Fall of the Roman Empire
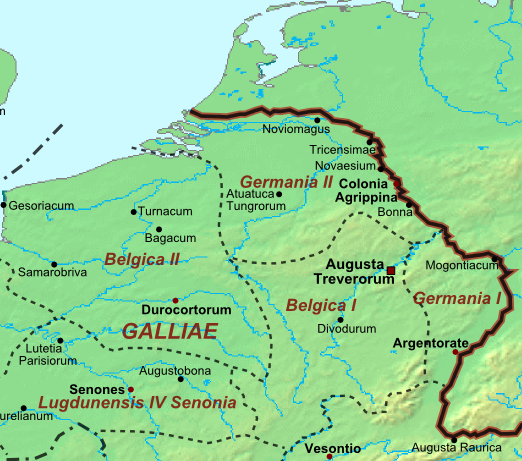
- Northern-Gall
| Date | 420–421 |
| Location | Belgica Secunda en Germania Secunda |
| Result | Roman victory |

Belligerents
| Ripuarian Franks | Western Roman Empire |

Commanders and leaders
| Theudemer | Castinus |

Strength
| 10,000–15,000 | 40,000 |

Casualties and losses
| Unknown | Unknown |

Castinus campaign against the Franks was a military campaign of the Roman army in the provinces of Germania II and Belgica I. The campaign was directed against the Ripuarian Franks, a Frankish people on the other side of the Rhine border. The command of the Roman army was in the hands of Flavius Castinus and took place in the years 420–421.

== Sources and interpretation ==
Almost nothing is known about Castinus campaign against the Franks. The only source is Gregory of Tours, a sixth-century writer who wrote a history of the Franks. For this he used the lost works of Renatus Profuturus Frigeridus as source. Gregory quotes Frigeridus about a Roman campaign led by Castinus during the time of Emperor Honorius. A reason and the result of the campaign is not given, which to all was probably a reaction to a Frankish attack caused by the decline of the Roman army.

== Course ==
Despite the restoration of imperial authority in Spain and Gaul by Constantius III, it seems that border guarding in the north was no longer as thorough as in the period before the Rhine Crossing. According to C. R. Davison, the Roman army had lost its ability to strike. Unlike in the previous period, raids from Germany were no longer followed by punitive expeditions to the attackers' home areas. An other reason may also have been an uprising by Frankish foederati who had partly taken over border control since the restoration of the Limes.

In the course of 419, Frankish tribes crossed the Rhine border and plundered the villages and lands. Eventually they moved up to Augusta Treverorum (Trier) whom they besieged.

=== Castinus campaign ===
When the news of the Frankish invasion reached the imperial rulers in Ravenna, an army was prepared. The command of this army was entrusted to Castinus, a hitherto unknown soldier who held the rank of comes domesticorum. In 420 he crossed the Alps and led the army to northern Gaul to face the Franks. Castinus relieved the city of Trier and campaigned against the Franks for 421. From Castinus' promotion to magister militum in 421, it can be deduced that he successfully completed his campaign against the Franks.

In view of other reports that have been handed down, Castinus returned to Ravenna when a political crisis broke out between the western and eastern part of the Roman Empire over the elevation of Constantius III to co-emperor of the west. In addition to the tensions between East and West, a revolt had broken out in Spain by the Vandals. Castinus was ordered to put down this revolt.

== Aftermate ==
Castinus campaign made an end to the raids of the Ripuarian Franks, but the result of hia campaign was short-lived. A few years later in 428 the city of Trier was again attacked by Franks and put to ransom. Taking advantage of the weakening of Roman power caused by the Roman Civil between 427 and 429, the Franks invaded Belgica Secunda in northern Gaul and occupied the territory to the Somme. The Roman general Flavius Aetius was sent to make an end of this.

== Secondary sources ==
- Kurth, Godefrot (1896), Clovis
- Lebecq, Stéphane (1990), Nouvelle histoire de la France médiévale, vol. 1 : Les origines franques, ve – ixe siècle, Paris, Éditions du Seuil, coll. « Points. Histoire » (no 201)
- Davison, Christine Rachel (July 2013). "Chapter1: Barbarian agency and imperial withdrawal: the causes and consequences of political change in fourth- and fifth-century Trier and Cologne" (PDF). Late Antique Cities in the Rhineland: A Comparative Study of Trier and Cologne in the Fourth and Fifth Centuries (PhD thesis). University of Sheffield.
- Dierkens, A.; Pértin, P. (2003), The 5th-century advance of the Franks in Belgica II, history and archaeology
- Hughes, Ian (2012), Aetius: Attila's Nemesis, Pen & Sword Military, ISBN 978-1848842793
- Heinen, Heinz (2000), Reichstreue Nobiles im zestörten Trier (PDF), Zeitschrift für Papyrologie und Epigraphik, pp. 271–278
- Syvänne, Ilkka (2020), Military History of Late Rome 425–457, Pen & Sword Military, ISBN 978-1-4738-7217-2
