= Tripolitania (Roman province) =

Roman province in North Africa

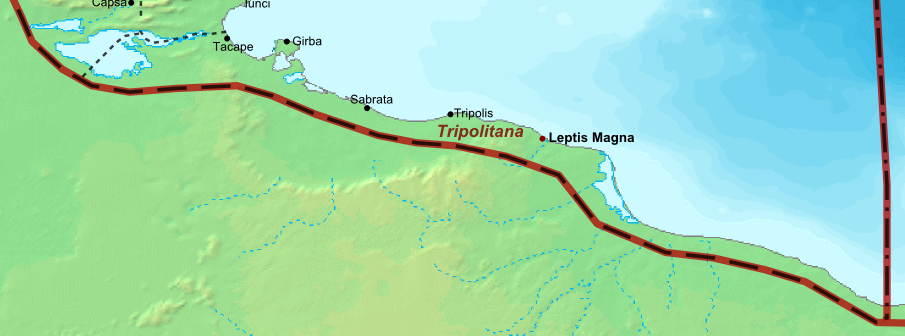
Tripolitania within the Diocese of Africa, c.400 AD

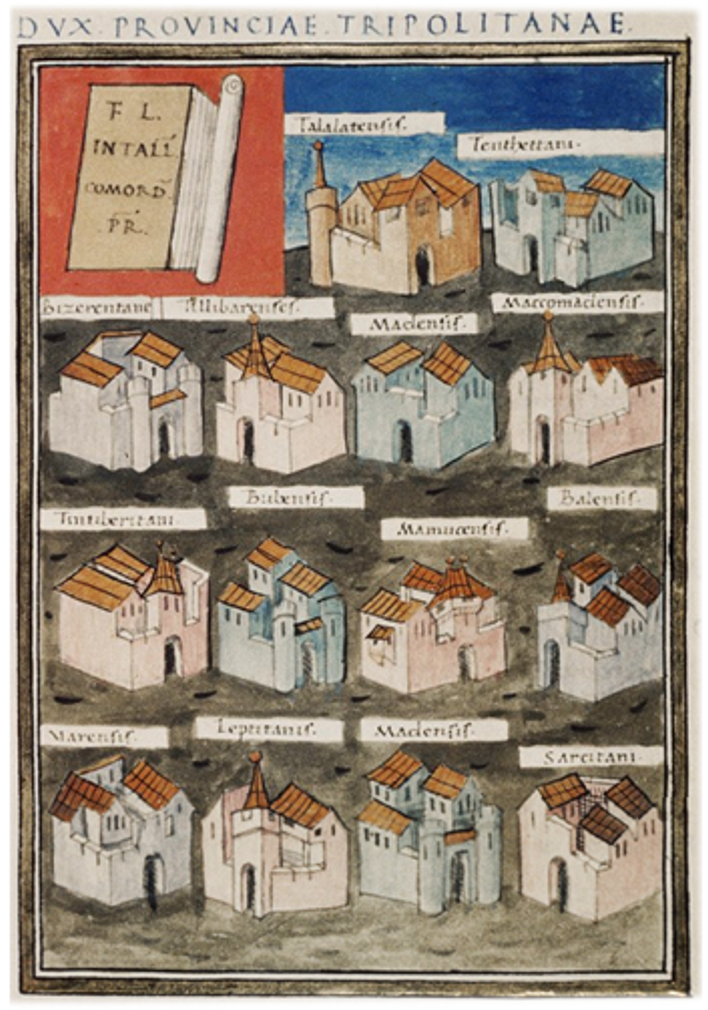
Notitia Dignitatum - Dux provinciae Tripolitanae

Tripolitania was a province of the Roman Empire. Between the 2nd century BC and the 3rd century AD it had been known as Syrtica; in the 3rd century it was renamed Tripolitania meaning "region of the three cities", referring to Oea (modern Tripoli of Libya), Sabratha and Leptis Magna.

Following the defeat of Carthage in the Punic Wars, Ancient Rome organized the region (along with what is now modern day Tunisia and eastern Algeria), into a province known as Africa, and placed it under the administration of a proconsul.

Tripolitania was the least urbanized region in Roman Africa.

One Jewish tradition traces the arrival of Jews in Tripolitania to the aftermath of the Roman destruction of Jerusalem in 70 CE, when generals under Titus allegedly sold Jewish captives to Bedouins in Yafran.

During the Diocletian reforms of the late 3rd century, all of North Africa was placed into the newly created Diocese of Africa, of which Tripolitania was a constituent province.

== Classical sources ==
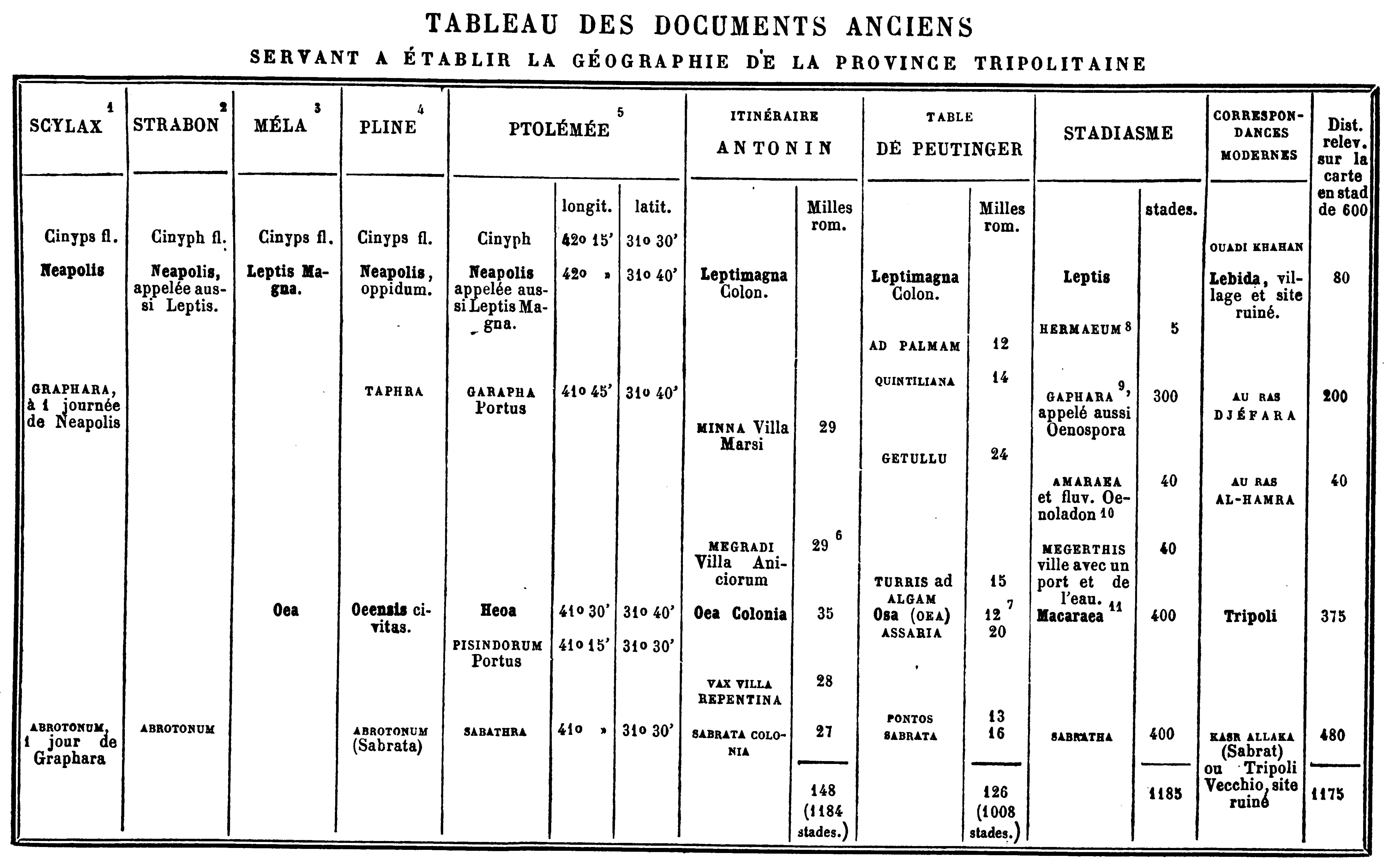
The ancient sites of Tripolitania as mentioned in Greco-Roman sources, summarized by Vivien de Saint-Martin in 1861

In the 19th century, some scholars debated the location of the classical sites within contemporary Ottoman Tripolitania. For example, Sabratha had been referred to by sailors as "Old Tripoli" and some classical names (e.g. Oea, Neapolis, Abrotonum) were no longer in modern use.

== Episcopal sees ==
Ancient episcopal sees of the late Roman province of Tripolitania listed in the Annuario Pontificio as titular sees:

- Gergis (Zargis)
- Gigthi
- Girba (Djerba, Tunisia)
- Leptis Magna
- Oëa
- Paraetonium
- Sabrata
- Sinnipsa (ruins of Abd-es-Saade?)
- Tacapae
- Teuchira
- Villamagna in Tripolitania (Henchir-Sidi-Abdein)
