= Uncial 0208 =

6th-century New Testament palimpsest

- New Testament manuscript
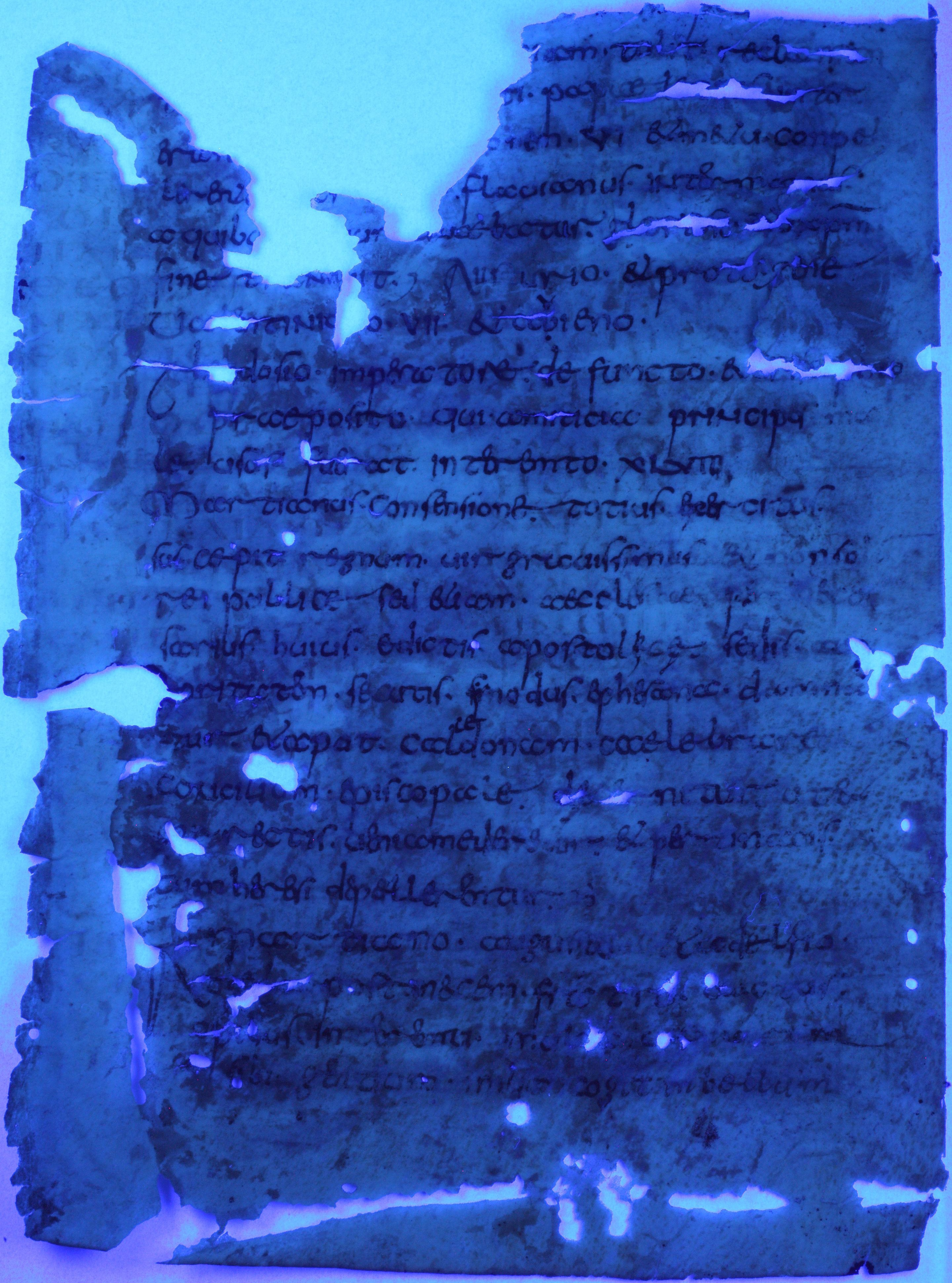
- Folio 2 verso
- Text: Colossians 1:29-2:10,13-14; 1 Thessalonians 2:4-7,12-17
- Date: 6th century
- Script: Greek
- Now at: Bavarian State Library
- Size: 23 x 16 cm
- Type: mixed
- Category: III

Uncial 0208 (in the Gregory-Aland numbering) is a Greek uncial manuscript of the New Testament, dated paleographically to the 6th century.

== Description ==
The codex contains a small parts of the Colossians 1:29-2:10,13-14; 1 Thessalonians 2:4-7,12-17, on two parchment leaves (23 cm by 16 cm). Written in two columns per page, 31 lines per page, in very large uncial letters. It is a palimpsest, the upper text contains the text of Prosper of Aquitaine's "Chronicon".

The text-type of this codex is mixed. Aland placed it in Category III.

In Colossians 2:2 it reads του θεου πατρος και του Χριστου for του θεου Χριστου; the reading of the codex is supported by minuscule 1908.

Currently it is dated by the INTF to the 6th century. It was written in Southern Italy.

The manuscript was added to the list of the New Testament manuscripts by Ernst von Dobschütz in 1933.

It was examined by Guglielmo Cavallo and Pasquale Orsini.

The codex currently is housed at the Bayerische Staatsbibliothek (29022 e) in Munich.

== See also ==
- List of New Testament uncials
- Textual criticism
