= Castinus =

5th century Roman general and consul

Flavius Castinus comes et patricius
- Born: unknown Roman Empire
- Died: unknown Western Roman Empire
- Occupation: General
- Office: Consul; Patrician
- Military career
- Years: 419–425
- Rank: comes domesticorum (419-422); Magister militum (422-425)
- Battles: Castinus campaign against the Franks; Spanish campaign Roman civil war of 425

Flavius Castinus was an influential Roman general and politician at the court of Emperor's' Honorius and Valentinian III, and most likely for some time before. He played a role in several military campaigns in Gaul and Hispania. He held the position of patricius and also served as consul for the year 424.

== Career ==
=== Early history ===
Castinus had the rank of comes domesticorum, commander of an elite unit in the Roman army under Constantius III. It has been recorded that he campaigned against the Franks, possibly as a general. It is certain that he had that rank in 421.

=== Vandal campaign in Spain ===
In 422 he fought an unsuccessful campaign in Hispania to subdue the Vandals. He was sent to support the Suevi or Suebians, enemies of the Vandals, and came with a force of Gothic foederati. However, the campaign was compromised at the very beginning when, according to one source, "his haughty and inept exercise of command" led to a quarrel between him and the military tribune Bonifacius, a protégé of Empress Galla Placidia. Bonifacius abruptly left the expedition, eventually arriving in Africa, where he began to build up a power base. Castinus continued on to Hispania, where at first he had considerable success against the Vandals in Baetica, managing to put them under a blockade and coming close to forcing them to surrender. Unfortunately at this point the Gothic auxiliaries betrayed him in some unspecified manner, which led to his defeat in Baetica. Castinus was forced to fall back to Tarraco (Tarragona).

The sudden death of the nonentity Emperor Honorius 15 August 423, which followed the death of the more active Constantius III (421) and the exile of Empress Galla Placidia to Constantinople (Spring 423), created a power vacuum "if it can be so described", observes John Matthews, which "was filled, as we should expect, by usurpation." The Eastern Emperor Theodosius II hesitated to nominate a new emperor of the West; Stewart Oost points out that with Honorius' death, "technically and legally he became sole ruler of the whole Roman Empire". Oost also argues that Theodosius reached an agreement with Castinus, where Castinus would act as his vice-regent in the West and in return Theodosius appointed Castinus and the Easterner Victor consuls for 424. If such an agreement was made, Castinus broke it when he joined in declaring Joannes, the senior civil servant, as the new Western Emperor in late 423.

Joannes was an insecure emperor. The Emperor Theodosius invested his young cousin Valentinian III with the honor of Caesar the next year, then dispatched an army against Joannes. The usurper was captured and executed in June/July 425. Castinus's role in these events is unknown; Oost notes of his "acts during the usurper's reign we hear absolutely nothing." Matthews succinctly states that Castinus was sent into exile; while agreeing with Matthews, Oost adds that a "doubtful source says that he found refuge in the Christian magnanimity of another old foe, Count Boniface of Africa."

Political offices
Preceded by Flavius Asclepiodotus, Flavius Avitus Marinianus	Consul of the Roman Empire; 424 with Victor	Succeeded by Joannes, Theodosius II, Valentinian III
Military offices
Preceded by Constantius III; In 421	Magister militum of the Western Roman Army; 422–425	Succeeded by Felix
