= 464 =

464 in various calendars
| Gregorian calendar | 464; CDLXIV |
| Ab urbe condita | 1217 |
| Assyrian calendar | 5214 |
| Balinese saka calendar | 385–386 |
| Bengali calendar | −130 – −129 |
| Berber calendar | 1414 |
| Buddhist calendar | 1008 |
| Burmese calendar | −174 |
| Byzantine calendar | 5972–5973 |
| Chinese calendar | 癸卯年 (Water Rabbit); 3161 or 2954 — to — 甲辰年 (Wood Dragon); 3162 or 2955 |
| Coptic calendar | 180–181 |
| Discordian calendar | 1630 |
| Ethiopian calendar | 456–457 |
| Hebrew calendar | 4224–4225 |
- Hindu calendars
| Vikram Samvat | 520–521 |
| Shaka Samvat | 385–386 |
| Kali Yuga | 3564–3565 |
| Holocene calendar | 10464 |
| Iranian calendar | 158 BP – 157 BP |
| Islamic calendar | 163 BH – 162 BH |
| Javanese calendar | 349–350 |
| Julian calendar | 464; CDLXIV |
| Korean calendar | 2797 |
| Minguo calendar | 1448 before ROC 民前1448年 |
| Nanakshahi calendar | −1004 |
| Seleucid era | 775/776 AG |
| Thai solar calendar | 1006–1007 |
| Tibetan calendar | 阴水兔年 (female Water-Rabbit); 590 or 209 or −563 — to — 阳木龙年 (male Wood-Dragon); 591 or 210 or −562 |

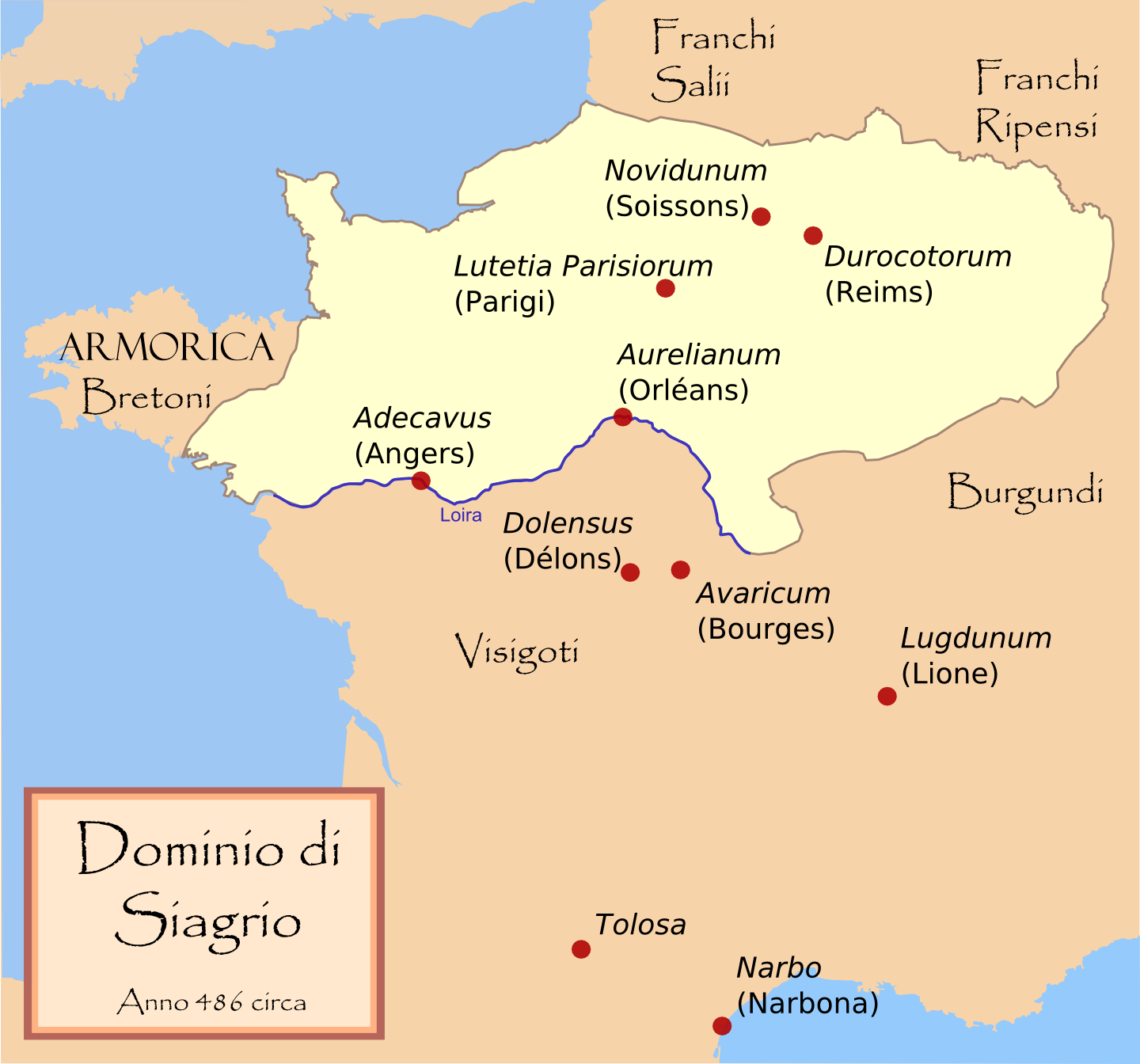
Kingdom of Syagrius (464)

Year 464 (CDLXIV) was a leap year starting on Wednesday of the Julian calendar. At the time, it was known as the Year of the Consulship of Rusticus and Olybrius (or, less frequently, year 1217 Ab urbe condita). The denomination 464 for this year has been used since the early medieval period, when the Anno Domini calendar era became the prevalent method in Europe for naming years.

== Events ==
=== By place ===
==== Roman Empire ====
- Olybrius is elected Roman consul by the Eastern court in Constantinople.

==== Europe ====
- The Suevic nation in Galicia (Northern Spain) is unified under King Remismund.
- King Theodoric II sends Remismund gifts (for recognizing his kingship), including weapons, and a Gothic princess for a wife.
- Aegidius dies (possibly poisoned) and is succeeded by his son Syagrius, who becomes ruler of the Domain of Soissons (Gaul).

== Births ==
- Hashim ibn 'Abd Manaf, great-grandfather of Mohammed (approximate date)
- Wu Di, Chinese emperor of the Liang dynasty (d. 549)

== Deaths ==
- Aegidius, Roman general (magister militum) (approximate date)
- Conall Gulban, king of Tir Chonaill (approximate date)
- Wang Xianyuan, empress and wife of Xiao Wu Di (b. 427)
- Xiao Wu Di, emperor of the Liu Song dynasty (b. 430)
