= Asterius campaign in Gallaecia =

- Part of Fall of the Western Roman Empire
- map of the Spanish provinces
Date	419-420
Location	Gallaecia
Result	Roman authority restored in Spain

Belligerents
West Roman Empire; Suebi	Vandals; Alans

Commanders and leaders
Asterius; Maurocellus	Maximus; Gunderic

Strength
± 10,500	unknown

Asterius campaign in Gallaecia was a military campaign of the Roman army in the province of Gallaecia (northwestern Spain). In 420 there were two conflicts in which the Romans intervened: an uprising by Maximus and a war between Suebi against the Vandals and Alans. The command of the Roman army was in the hands of Asterius, the comes Hispaniae, who was supported by auxiliary forces of the governor of Diocese of Hispania Maurocellus.

== Sources and interpretation ==
The most important source for the history of the 5th century in Spain is the chronicler Hydatius, additional information is provided by Orosius and Prosper. Unfortunately does Hydatius not provide a clear reason for the conflict and the data of Orosius and Prosper Tiro are limited. Several historians have delved into the how and why of this conflict, noting as a common denominator that the campaign was intended to bring balance the barbaric presence on the peninsula. However, according to Kulikowski, the main reason for Asterius' campaign lies in suppressing the second rebellion of Maximus. In his view, the conflict between the barbarian tribes is of less importance.

== Restoring Roman power in Spain ==
By order of the Romans the Aquitanian Goths restored Roman power in Spain between 416 and 418 in the Gothic War. They defeated Romes' enemies and almost destroyed them. Only the Vandal Asdings and the Suebi in Gallaecia, were spared. A clear reason why the latter were spared is not handed down. The sources only record that the influential general and commander-in-chief of the Roman army Constantius III found the result reached sufficient and ordered the Goths to stop the campaign. Among historians, the conviction prevails that the imperial authorities in Ravenna apparently had no objection to the presence of barbarians in the far Gallaecia, because the Roman administrative structure had been restored in the four main provinces in the dioceans of Hispania.

== Start ==
=== Revolt of Maximus ===
The resurrection of the usurpator Maximus was seen by Ravenna as a significant threat. He was probably the son, or at least a vassal, of the rebellious general Gerontius, who brought him up as emperor in 409. Their rule in Spain relied heavily on the support of the barbarian newcomers. After the death of Gerontius in 411, Maximus was deposed by his army and fled to the barbarians in Gallaecia, where he has stayed since then. His uprising most likely began in the second half of 419. According to the testimony of Orosius, he enjoyed the support of the barbarians.

=== Rivalry between the Vandals and Suebi ===
Although direct evidence is missing, it is considered that the Vandals were Maximus' main allies, and not the Suebi. The Suebi arrived in the Roman province of Gallaecia in 409 under King Hermeric († 441), where they founded their own empire, while the Vandals also acquired land. When Maximus reappeared in 419, a war broke out between Gunderik, the king of the Vandals, and Hermerik, the king of the Suebi. Hydatius reports that the Suebi were besieged by the Vandals in the Narbasi mountains. Much is unclear regarding this war, like the reason for this conflict and the exact location of their battle. Also remains the role of Maximus in this situation unsure.

=== Course of the war ===
The imperial army under command of comes Hispaniarum Asterius marched from Tarraconensis to the Vandals in Gallaecia and instructed them to end the war with the Suebi. According to Hydatius, the Vandals stopped their siege of the Suevi at the appearance of the Romans and retreated to the city of Braga, where they were able to defeat the Roman army under Maurocellus. The sources do not mention how Maximus was captured. The events that subsequently took place in Baetica show that Asterius' campaign did not yield the desired result in neutralizing the Vandals, as they suddenly appeared there and caused further problems.

== Epilogue ==
From the letters of Consentius, written between September 420 and March 421, it can be deduced that Asterius was successful in suppressing the usurpation of Maximus. The defeated Maximus was triumphantly carried away during the celebration of Honorius' thirtieth anniversary of the throne in January 422. Asterius was rewarded for his role in knock of the uprising with the supreme command over the Roman army and the title of patrician. For this he became the successor of Constantius, who had become Honorius' imperial colleague in February 421.

Among historians prevails the view that Asterius' campaign was only partially successful, since the arrival of the Vandals in Baetica meant that this province became unsafe again. There presence was a threat for Roman authority in the south of Hispania.

== See also ==
- List of Roman battles
- Decline of the Western Roman Empire
