= 381 =

381 in various calendars
- Gregorian calendar: 381; CCCLXXXI
- Ab urbe condita: 1134
- Assyrian calendar: 5131
- Balinese saka calendar: 302–303
- Bengali calendar: −213 – −212
- Berber calendar: 1331
- Buddhist calendar: 925
- Burmese calendar: −257
- Byzantine calendar: 5889–5890
- Chinese calendar: 庚辰年 (Metal Dragon); 3078 or 2871 — to — 辛巳年 (Metal Snake); 3079 or 2872
- Coptic calendar: 97–98
- Discordian calendar: 1547
- Ethiopian calendar: 373–374
- Hebrew calendar: 4141–4142
- Hindu calendars
- Vikram Samvat: 437–438
- Shaka Samvat: 302–303
- Kali Yuga: 3481–3482
- Holocene calendar: 10381
- Iranian calendar: 241 BP – 240 BP
- Islamic calendar: 248 BH – 247 BH
- Javanese calendar: 263–264
- Julian calendar: 381; CCCLXXXI
- Korean calendar: 2714
- Minguo calendar: 1531 before ROC 民前1531年
- Nanakshahi calendar: −1087
- Seleucid era: 692/693 AG
- Thai solar calendar: 923–924
- Tibetan calendar: ལྕགས་ཕོ་འབྲུག་ལོ་ (male Iron-Dragon); 507 or 126 or −646 — to — ལྕགས་མོ་སྦྲུལ་ལོ་ (female Iron-Snake); 508 or 127 or −645

Year 381 (CCCLXXXI) was a common year starting on Friday of the Julian calendar. At the time, it was known as the Year of the Consulship of Syagrius and Eucherius (or, less frequently, year 1134 Ab urbe condita). The denomination 381 for this year has been used since the early medieval period, when the Anno Domini calendar era became the prevalent method in Europe for naming years.

== Events ==
=== By place ===
==== Roman Empire ====
- Emperor Gratian moves the capital to Mediolanum (modern-day Milan). Because of his Christian beliefs, he eliminates Pontifex Maximus as Imperial title. Gratian also refuses the robe of office, insulting the pagan aristocrats of Rome.
- The Gallic city of Cularo is renamed Gratianopolis (later Grenoble), in honor of Gratian having created a bishopric.

==== Europe ====
- The Visigothic chieftain Athanaric becomes the first foreign king to visit the Eastern Roman capital of Constantinople. He negotiates a peace treaty with emperor Theodosius I that makes his people foederati as "one body within the imperial soldiery". Athanaric dies 2 weeks later after an 18-year reign in which he has been undisputed king of all the Goths for just 1 year. The peace will continue until Theodosius's death in 395.
- The Sciri together with the Huns attack along Rome's lower Danubian frontier.

=== By topic ===
==== Religion ====
- First Council of Constantinople (some authorities date this council to 383): Theodosius I calls a general council to affirm and extend the Nicene Creed, and denounce Arianism and Apollinarism. Most trinitarian churches consider this an Ecumenical council.
- Council of Aquileia: Ambrose and the council depose the Arian bishops Palladius of Ratiaria and Secundianus of Singidunum.
- Flavian succeeds Meletius as Patriarch of Antioch.
- Timothy succeeds Peter II as Patriarch of Alexandria.
- Nectarius succeeds Gregory Nazianzus as Archbishop of Constantinople.
- John Chrysostom becomes a deacon.

== Births ==
- Helian Bobo, Chinese emperor of the Xiongnu state Xia (d. 425)

== Deaths ==
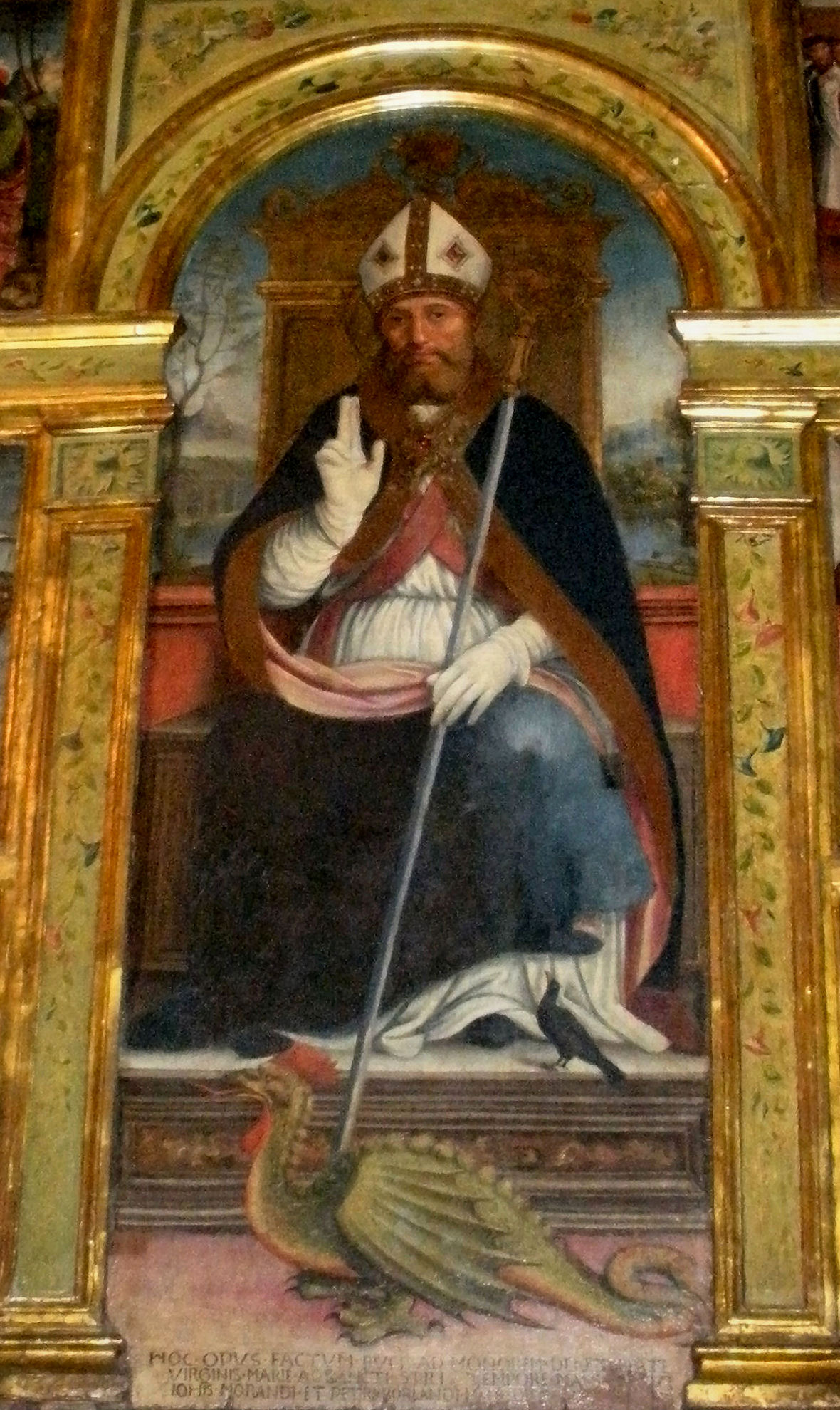
Saint Syrus of Genoa

- February 15 – Faustinus of Brescia, Roman Catholic bishop and saint
- February 27 – Peter II, Patriarch of Alexandria
- June 29 – Saint Syrus, Bishop of Genoa

=== Date unknown ===
- Athanaric, king of the Visigoths
- Saint Meletius, Patriarch of Antioch
