= 421 =

421 in various calendars
- Gregorian calendar: 421; CDXXI
- Ab urbe condita: 1174
- Assyrian calendar: 5171
- Balinese saka calendar: 342–343
- Bengali calendar: −173 – −172
- Berber calendar: 1371
- Buddhist calendar: 965
- Burmese calendar: −217
- Byzantine calendar: 5929–5930
- Chinese calendar: 庚申年 (Metal Monkey); 3118 or 2911 — to — 辛酉年 (Metal Rooster); 3119 or 2912
- Coptic calendar: 137–138
- Discordian calendar: 1587
- Ethiopian calendar: 413–414
- Hebrew calendar: 4181–4182
- Hindu calendars
- Vikram Samvat: 477–478
- Shaka Samvat: 342–343
- Kali Yuga: 3521–3522
- Holocene calendar: 10421
- Iranian calendar: 201 BP – 200 BP
- Islamic calendar: 207 BH – 206 BH
- Javanese calendar: 305–306
- Julian calendar: 421; CDXXI
- Korean calendar: 2754
- Minguo calendar: 1491 before ROC 民前1491年
- Nanakshahi calendar: −1047
- Seleucid era: 732/733 AG
- Thai solar calendar: 963–964
- Tibetan calendar: ལྕགས་ཕོ་སྤྲེ་ལོ་ (male Iron-Monkey); 547 or 166 or −606 — to — ལྕགས་མོ་བྱ་ལོ་ (female Iron-Bird); 548 or 167 or −605

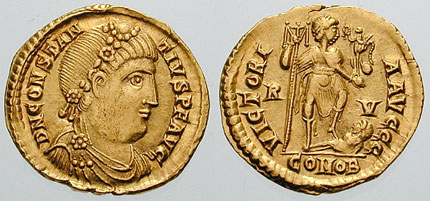
Solidus of Emperor Constantius III

Year 421 (CDXXI) was a common year starting on Saturday of the Julian calendar. At the time, it was known as the Year of the Consulship of Agricola and Eustathius (or, less frequently, year 1174 Ab urbe condita). The denomination 421 for this year has been used since the early medieval period, when the Anno Domini calendar era became the prevalent method in Europe for naming years.

== Events ==
=== By place ===
==== Roman Empire ====
- February 8 – Constantius III is appointed co-emperor (Augustus) with his ineffectual brother-in-law, Honorius, and becomes the real ruler of the Western Roman Empire.
- March 25 – Venice is founded at twelve o'clock noon (according to legend) with the dedication of the first church, San Giacomo, at the islet of Rialto (Italy).
- June 7 – Emperor Theodosius II marries Aelia Eudocia, a woman of Greek origin. The wedding is celebrated at Constantinople with chariot racing in the Hippodrome.
- September 2 – Constantius III dies suddenly of an illness; his wife Galla Placidia becomes, for the second time, a widow.
- Castinus campaign against the Franks: A Roman army under command of Castinus fights against the Franks in Northern Gaul.

==== Europe ====
- Rugila, chieftain of the Huns, attacks the dioceses of Dacia and Thrace (Balkans). Theodosius II allows Pannonian Ostrogoths to settle in Thrace, to defend the Danube frontier.
- The Franks conquer new territories in their kingdom and sack the old Roman capital Augusta Treverorum (modern Trier).

==== Persia ====
- Roman–Sassanid War: Theodosius II starts a war against the Sassanids, sending an expeditionary force under command of Ardaburius, and invades Mesopotamia.
- Autumn – Ardaburius devastates Arzanene (Armenia) and forces the Persians to retreat to Nisibis (Syria). King Bahram V allies himself with the Lakhmid Arabs of Hirah.

== Deaths ==
- September 2 – Constantius III, emperor of the Western Roman Empire
- Jin Gongdi, last emperor of the Jin Dynasty (b. 386)
- Li Xun, ruler of the Chinese state Western Liang
- Mary of Egypt, patron saint (approximate date)
- Ravina I, rabbi (teacher) and Jewish Talmudist
