= Roman civil war of 425 =

War between Emperor Joannes and Emperor Theodosius II

Roman Civil War of 425
- Part of Fall of the Western Roman Empire
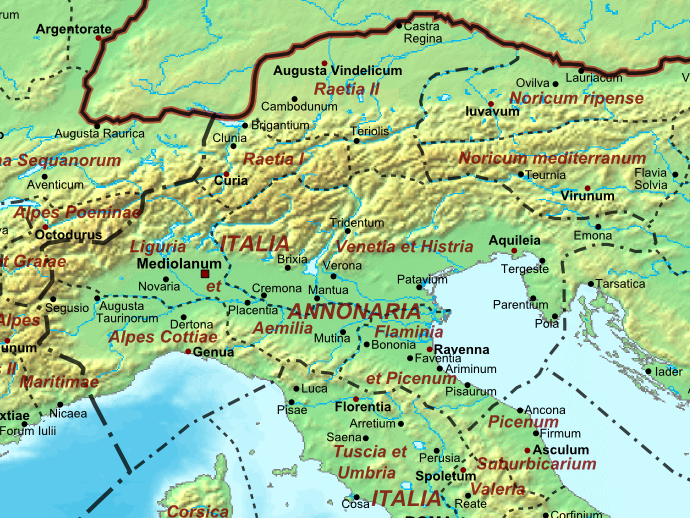
- Northern Italy
Date	425
Location	Italia
Result	Eastern Roman victory; Flavius Aetius becomes the Magister militum per Gallias

Belligerents
Western Roman Empire; Huns	Eastern Roman Empire; African rebels

Commanders and leaders
Joannes (executed); Castinus; Flavius Aetius	Theodosius II; Galla Placidia; Ardaburius; Aspar; Bonifatius

Strength
10,000–15,000	15,000

Casualties and losses
Unknown	Unknown

The Roman Civil War of 425 was a short civil war between the West Roman Emperor Joannes and the East Roman Emperor Theodosius II. After rising tensions, battles took place in Italy between the armies of both halves of the empire. Despite this, the conflict did not end by battle, but as a result of a conspiracy in which the Western emperor was captured and killed shortly afterwards.

== Background ==
Already at the beginning of his reign on November 20, 423, Joannes was not recognized as emperor by the eastern court in Constantinople, but considered as a usurpator. After the death of his predecessor Honorius, the nephew of the eastern emperor, he was pushed forward as a successor by Castinus, patricius and magister militum (commander-in-chief) of the western army. His reign was not recognized in the North- African province, ruled by comes Africae Bonifatius.

== The Civil War ==
In 424, diplomatic tensions between the two imperial halves continued when Theodosius named his nephew Valentinian as Caesar of the western part with his mother Placidia as Augusta. Prosper writes that an Italian field army unsuccessfully fought against Bonifatius and that the western army was weakened by the losses there. The bucellari, the strong private army of Bonifatius, played a decisive role in this.

Joannes feared an attack from the east and sent his general Aetius on a mission to the Huns for military aid. Before this help arrived, Theodosius decided to take action and ordered his chief commander-in-chief magister militum Ardaburius to overthrow Joannes Reijn. Ardaburius prepared his army, commanded the fleet himself and sent his son Aspar by land through Dalmatia to Italia. The eastern army landed in Aquileia early 425 and took the city in no time. Some time later, Aspar's field army arrived and joined Ardaburius' main force.

Soon after, battles broke out between the western and eastern armies, with Ardaburius accidentally falling into the hands of the western army. With regard to this event, the sources are vague and contradictory. According to Prosper, the imperial court at Ravenna was attacked and taken. John of Antioch, on the other hand, argues that a shepherd led the army of Aspar safely through the swamps that protected the city and that local allies opened the gate for them.

Nevertheless, the captured commander-in-chief was well treated by Joannes. Maybe the emperor hoped to reach an agreement with Theodosius II. According to Stewart East West Ardaburius, during his captivity, he persuaded a number of Western Roman officers to commit a coup against Emperor Joannes, which they succeeded in doing. The Ravenna garrison opened the gates to the Eastern Roman army after which the emperor could be taken captive.

== End ==
After his capture, John was beheaded in May 425 after a hand had previously been knocked off from him. Three days after his death, another battle took place between Aspar and Aëtius, which ended in a draw. Aëtius then entered into an agreement with Ardaburius and Aspar and entered the service of the new Western Roman government. Valentinian III was appointed emperor in the West shortly afterwards. Castinus, the commander-in-chief of the Western Army, was removed from office and then exiled.

== Primary sources ==
- Olympiodorus
- Socrates Scholasticus
- Prosper
- Procopius
- Renatus Profuturus Frigeridus
- Gregory of Tours

== Bibliography ==
- Matthews, John (1990). Western Aristocracies and Imperial Court AD 364 – 425. Oxford: Clarendon Press.
- Wijnendaele, Jeroen P. (2016). "Warlordism and the Disintegration of the Western Roman Army". In Jeremy Armstrong (ed.). Circum Mare: Themes in Ancient Warfare. Leiden: Brill. pp. 185–203. ISBN 9789004284845.
