= 425 =

425 in various calendars
- Gregorian calendar: 425; CDXXV
- Ab urbe condita: 1178
- Assyrian calendar: 5175
- Balinese saka calendar: 346–347
- Bengali calendar: −169 – −168
- Berber calendar: 1375
- Buddhist calendar: 969
- Burmese calendar: −213
- Byzantine calendar: 5933–5934
- Chinese calendar: 甲子年 (Wood Rat); 3122 or 2915 — to — 乙丑年 (Wood Ox); 3123 or 2916
- Coptic calendar: 141–142
- Discordian calendar: 1591
- Ethiopian calendar: 417–418
- Hebrew calendar: 4185–4186
- Hindu calendars
- Vikram Samvat: 481–482
- Shaka Samvat: 346–347
- Kali Yuga: 3525–3526
- Holocene calendar: 10425
- Iranian calendar: 197 BP – 196 BP
- Islamic calendar: 203 BH – 202 BH
- Javanese calendar: 309–310
- Julian calendar: 425; CDXXV
- Korean calendar: 2758
- Minguo calendar: 1487 before ROC 民前1487年
- Nanakshahi calendar: −1043
- Seleucid era: 736/737 AG
- Thai solar calendar: 967–968
- Tibetan calendar: ཤིང་ཕོ་བྱི་བ་ལོ་ (male Wood-Rat); 551 or 170 or −602 — to — ཤིང་མོ་གླང་ལོ་ (female Wood-Ox); 552 or 171 or −601

Year 425 (CDXXV) was a common year starting on Thursday of the Julian calendar. At the time, it was known as the Year of the Consulship of Theodosius and Valentinianus (or, less frequently, year 1178 Ab urbe condita). The denomination 425 for this year has been used since the early medieval period, when the Anno Domini calendar era became the prevalent method in Europe for naming years.

== Events ==
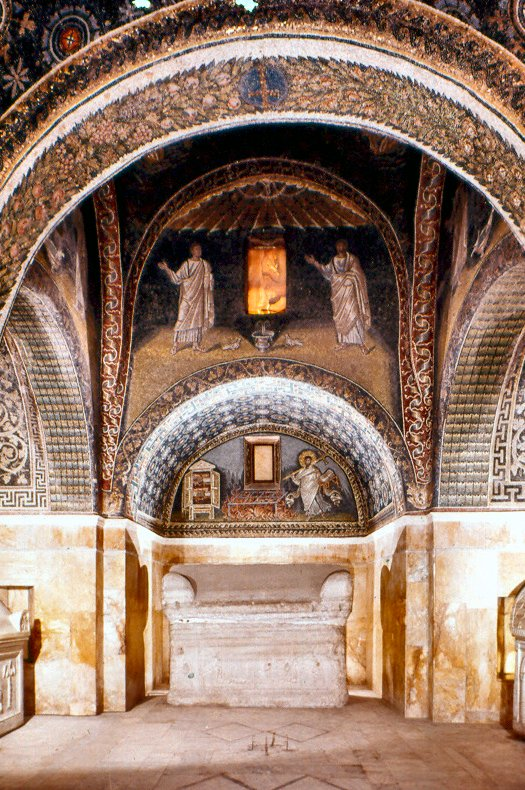
Mausoleum of Galla Placidia (Ravenna)

=== By place ===
==== Roman Empire ====
- Roman civil war: Summer – Joannes, Roman usurper, is defeated at the fortified city of Ravenna and brought to Aquileia. After a humiliating parade on a donkey and the insults of the populace, he is executed.
- October 23 – Valentinian III, six-year-old son of Galla Placidia, is installed as emperor (Augustus) of the Western Roman Empire. Real power is in the hands of his mother who becomes a regent.
- Flavius Aetius leads a force of Huns (60,000 men) into Northern Italy. He reaches a compromise with Placidia, in return for obtaining the rank commander-in-chief (magister militum) in Gaul.
- The Huns advance unopposed on Constantinople, but are halted by a plague that decimates their hordes (see 433).

==== Israel ====
- After death of Gamaliel VI, the Sanhedrin is disbanded by the Roman Empire.

=== By topic ===
==== Arts and Sciences ====
- c. 425–426 – Mausoleum of Galla Placidia is built.

==== Education ====
- February 27 – The University of Constantinople is founded by emperor Theodosius II at the urging of his wife Aelia Eudocia.

==== Religion ====
- Buddhism begins to spread to Southeast Asia.

== Births ==
- Iamblichus, Syrian philosopher
- Zeno, Byzantine Emperor (approximate date)

== Deaths ==
- November 5 – Atticus, archbishop of Constantinople
- Gamaliel VI, last Nasi (head of the Sanhedrin)
- Helian Bobo, emperor of the Chinese Xiongnu state Xia (born 381)
- Joannes, Roman usurper
- Mavia, Arab warrior-queen
- Sulpicius Severus, Christian writer (approximate date)
- Yax Nuun Ahiin I 15th Ajaw of Tikal (approximate date)
