= 482 =

Calendar year

482 in various calendars
Gregorian calendar	482; CDLXXXII
Ab urbe condita	1235
Assyrian calendar	5232
Balinese saka calendar	403–404
Bengali calendar	−112 – −111
Berber calendar	1432
Buddhist calendar	1026
Burmese calendar	−156
Byzantine calendar	5990–5991
Chinese calendar	辛酉年 (Metal Rooster); 3179 or 2972 — to — 壬戌年 (Water Dog); 3180 or 2973
Coptic calendar	198–199
Discordian calendar	1648
Ethiopian calendar	474–475
Hebrew calendar	4242–4243
- Hindu calendars
Vikram Samvat	538–539
Shaka Samvat	403–404
Kali Yuga	3582–3583
Holocene calendar	10482
Iranian calendar	140 BP – 139 BP
Islamic calendar	144 BH – 143 BH
Javanese calendar	368–369
Julian calendar	482; CDLXXXII
Korean calendar	2815
Minguo calendar	1430 before ROC 民前1430年
Nanakshahi calendar	−986
Seleucid era	793/794 AG
Thai solar calendar	1024–1025
Tibetan calendar	ལྕགས་མོ་བྱ་ལོ་ (female Iron-Bird); 608 or 227 or −545 — to — ཆུ་ཕོ་ཁྱི་ལོ་ (male Water-Dog); 609 or 228 or −544

Year 482 (CDLXXXII) was a common year starting on Friday of the Julian calendar. At the time, it was known as the Year of the Consulship of Severinus and Illus (or, less frequently, year 1235 Ab urbe condita). The denomination 482 for this year has been used since the early medieval period, when the Anno Domini calendar era became the prevalent method in Europe for naming years.

== Events ==
=== By place ===
==== Byzantine Empire ====
- Emperor Zeno promulgates an Edict of Union (Henotikon), in an unsuccessful effort to soften the decision made at the Council of Chalcedon (451), and resolve differences between the Eastern and Western Churches. Zeno wishes to placate the Monophysite churches of Egypt, Palestine and Syria for political reasons.

==== Eastern Europe ====
- Legendary founding of Kyiv, on the banks of the Dnieper River.

==== China ====
- Prince Qi Wudi succeeds his father Qi Gaodi, and becomes emperor of Southern Qi.

== Births ==
- Justinian I, emperor of the Byzantine Empire (d. 565)

== Deaths ==
- January 8 – Severinus of Noricum, monk and saint
- Ailill Molt, High King of Ireland (approximate date)
- Qi Gaodi, Chinese emperor of Southern Qi (b. 427)
