= Abdas of Susa =

Bishop and Saint

Saint Abdas
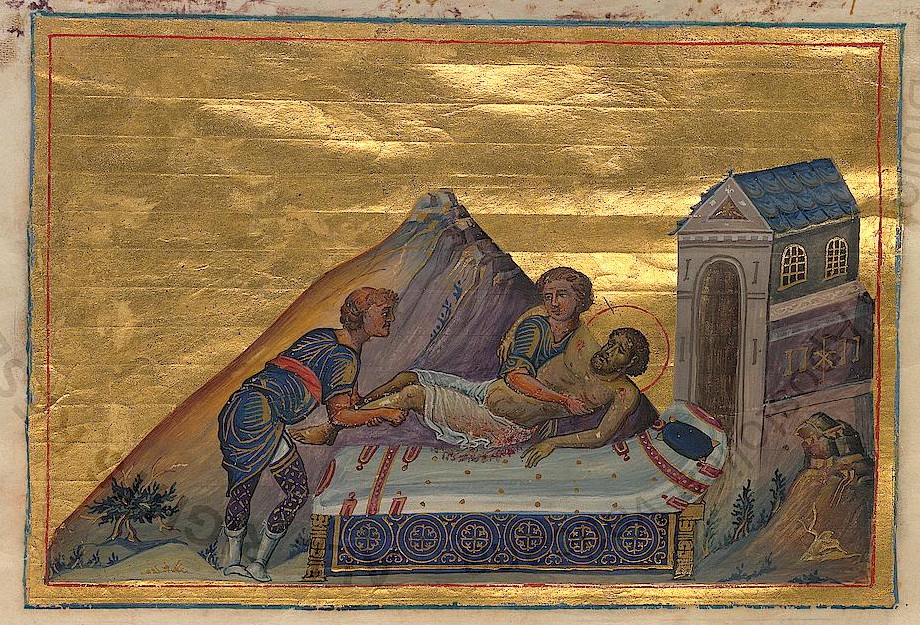
- Born: c. 4th century AD; Chaldor, Sasanian Empire
- Died: c. 420 AD; Susa, Khuzistan, Sasanian Empire
- Venerated in: Eastern Orthodoxy; Roman Catholicism; Oriental Orthodoxy
- Feast: March 31 (Syriac Christianity); May 16 (Western Christianity)

Abdas, (also Abda, Abdias, and Audas) was bishop of Susa in Iran. Socrates of Constantinople calls him "bishop of Persia". He was executed under the orders of shah Yazdegerd I after refusing to rebuild a Zoroastrian fire temple that he had destroyed.

== Life ==
Abdas was born in fourth-century Chaldor to a Zoroastrian mother, who educated him in matters of virtue. After Abdas reached adulthood, he was ordained a Christian priest, and built up in his hometown a monastery and a school, which grew to have around 60 teachers. Abdas baptized many converts in Chaldan, which caused the magi to arrest him. In prison, Abdas was subjected to humiliations, hunger and pain, but remained a Christian until his release. Abdas became a bishop in Susa.

Abdas was an associate of Maruthas of Martyropolis. Abdas is supposed to have helped Maruthas in driving out a demon from King Yezdegerd's son. However, his impetuosity, put an end to the good relations between the Persian king and the Christian community. In c. 419-420, Abdas, in cooperation with a band of Christian priests and laymen, levelled a Zoroastrian fire temple, for which they were summoned to court to answer for their actions. Yazdegerd I reputedly asked Abdas; "Since you are the chief and leader of these men, why do you allow them to despise our kingdom, to transgress against our command, and to act in accordance with their own will? Do you demolish and destroy our houses of worship and the foundations of our fire temples, which we have received from the fathers of our fathers to honor?" While Abdas hesitated to answer, a priest in his entourage replied back, saying "I demolished the foundation and extinguished the fire because it is not a house of God, nor is the fire the daughter of God." Demolishing a fire temple was reportedly a way of broadcasting the "victory of Christianity." Abdas ultimately refused to have the fire temple rebuilt, and was as a result, he was subsequently executed.

Abdas' companions included the priests Hashu and Isaac, the secretary Ephrem, the hypodeacon Papa, the laymen Daduk and Durdan, and Papa, a brother of Abdas himself were also killed. His feast day is 16 May.
