= Maurocellus =

Maurocellus was around 420 governor (vicar) of the diocese Hispania.

== History ==
In all likelihood, after the end of the Gothic War, Maurocellus received the post of vicar in Hispania in 418. After a chaotic period in which imperial authority had disappeared in Spain, the Aquitan Goths restored between 416 and 418 the Roman power. In the four most important provinces of the diocese Hispania, the Roman governing structure was restored and army and officials returned.

In 420, Maurocellus led a Roman army. From the capital Emerita Augusta he made his way to Gallaecia to support General Asterius in his campaign against Maximus and the Vandals. At the city Braga he suffered a great defeat.
