= Theodemer (Frankish king) =

Frankish king

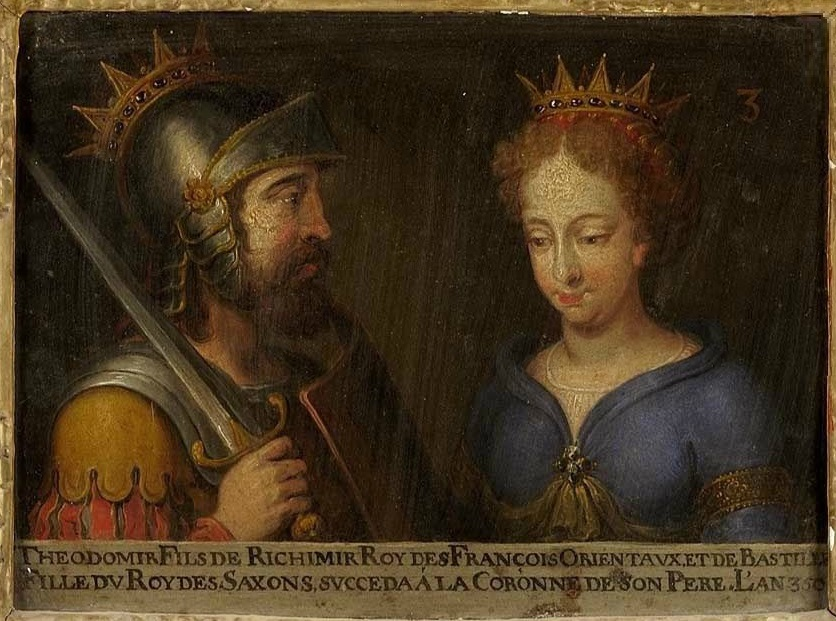
- Double portrait depicting Theodomir (left) with his wife, Uffizi Gallery, Florence.

King of the Salian Franks
- Reign: 393–421/428?
- Predecessor: Richomer
- Successor: Chlodio
- Died: 421-428?
- Father: Richomer
- Mother: Ascyla

Theodemer (also Theudomer) was a Frankish king in the early 5th century. He was the son of Richomeres and his wife Ascyla. He is mentioned by Gregory of Tours, who wrote in the 6th century.

He is also apparently mentioned in the Chronicle of Fredegar, written in the 7th century, which says that the father of the Frankish king Chlodio was named Theodemer.

If his father was the Roman commander called Richomeres, then Theodemer may have been a cousin of Arbogastes.

== Sources ==
Almost nothing is known about Theodemer, as he is only mentioned by Gregory of Tours and Fredegar..

Gregory (II.9) gave extended quotes from a lost history by Sulpicius Alexander. He said that the now lost Fasti Consulares mention that Theodomer, king of the Franks, son of Richimer, and Ascyla his mother, were slain by the sword (Theudomerem regem Francorum, filium Richimeris quondam, et Ascylam, matrem eius, gladio interfectos). The sequence of events implies that this happened in the early 5th century.

The 7th-century Chronicles of Fredegar who calls Chlodio Theodemer's son. Much more is known about Theodemer's father and the family from which he descended. They belonged to the Frankish elite which since Emperor Valentinian I (364-375) supplied troops to the Roman army.

== Origin ==
The family of Ricomer and Arbogast, which might have been Theodemer's family, belonged to the Frankish elite who were closely intertwined with the Roman military and political system in the late Roman period. He was the son of Richomer and Ascyla. Ricomer was magister militum praesentalis (one of the two commanders-in-chief of the Eastern Roman army) and consul in 384 under Emperor Theodosius I (379-395) . Nothing is known of his mother, but her name points to a Greek descent.

As the son of a high-ranking officer in the eastern part of the empire, Theodemer probably grew up in Constantinople and returned to his tribal relatives in North Gaul after his father's death in 493.

== Bibliography ==
- Gregory of Tours, Historia Francorum, book II, chapter 9.
- Martindale, John R., ed. (1980). The Prosopography of the Later Roman Empire: Volume II, AD 395–527. Cambridge: Cambridge University Press. ISBN 0-521-20159-4.
