= Asterius (comes Hispaniarum) =

West Roman army officer

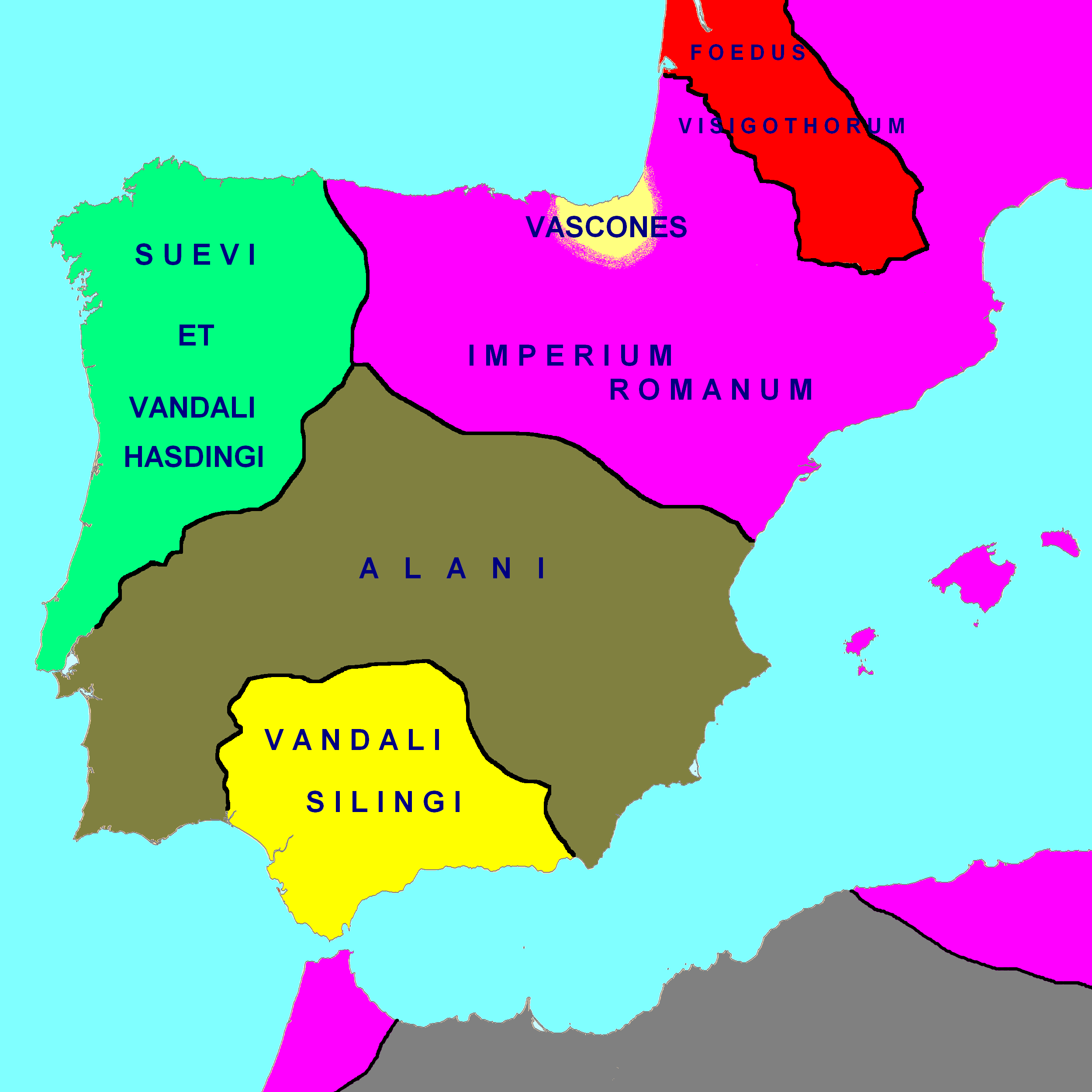
Hispania in the year 416.

Asterius (fl. 419–422) was a Roman general who obtained the title of comes Hispaniarum in which capacity he participated in an important military expedition against the Vandals who had established themselves in the north of Gallaecia. He was also able to defeat the usurper Maximus of Hispania, who had taken refuge with the barbarian tribes there. Due to his military prowess and his considerable amount of battlefield victories, he was given the title of Patrician in 422.

== Campaign in Hispania ==
After the victories of Wallia in the campaigns of 416 and 418, the defeated Alans and Silingi Vandals took refuge with the Hasdingi Vandals who were established in the coastal areas of Gallaecia, north of the Minho River. The Vandals, needing new territories to place their newly acquired populations, expanded to the south and blocked their neighbors, the Suebi at the Battle of the Nervasos Mountains of 419.

In 419, Asterius was sent as comes Hispaniarum with a powerful Roman army to finish retaking the territories occupied by the barbarian invaders in Hispania and to put down the second uprising of Maximus of Hispania.

In 419, a Frontón priest accused several important families, including that of Asterius of Priscillianism, which forced him to travel to Tarraco to defend his family against the allegations.

Later in the same year, Asterius was in Tarraco, where he established his Praetorium and gathered an army to commence a military campaign in Gallaecia. He came to the aid of a Suebi army which was surrounded by the Vandals, defeating them at the Battle of the Nervasos Mountains. He was unable to prevent a large body of the enemy from retreating to Hispania Baetica, a move which ultimately came out in Asturias' favor. A year later in 420, Asterius' campaign forced the Vandals to retreat south where they were intercepted at Bracara Augusta by the vicarius, Maurocellus. The two Roman armies attacked the Vandals from both sides, decisively defeating them.

In 421, Asterius was called to Ravenna after the elevation of Constantius III as emperor. He was named a Patrician.

One source suggests he held the office of magister militum; other sources dispute this, but acknowledge that another Hispano-Roman magister militum is recorded as having fought the Bacaudae of Tarraconensis in 441. It is conceivable that one Asterius had been taken for the other. Other sources also speculate that the two may have been related as the number of Imperial officials from Hispania recorded in contemporary chronicles drops off considerably during this time.

== Bibliography ==
- Kulikowski, Michael (2004). Late Roman Spain and Its Cities. The Johns Hopkins University Press. pp. 195–96. ISBN 9780801898327.
