= Diocese of Africa =

Diocese of the Roman Empire

Coordinates: 35°N 9°E

Diocese of Africa Dioecesis Africae
- Diocese of the Roman Empire
- 314 – 439
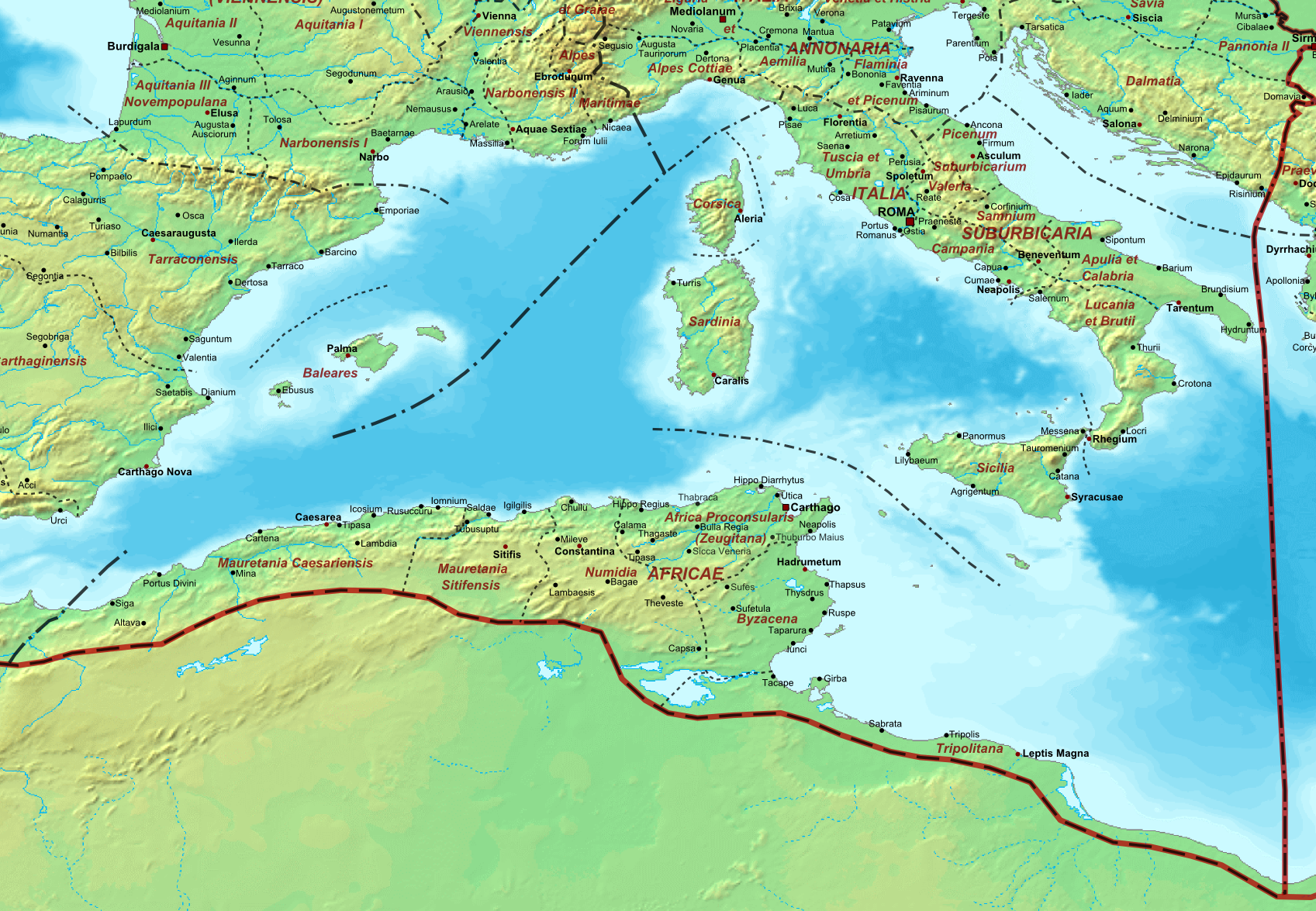
- Diocese of Africa - AD 400
- Capital: Carthage
- Historical era: Late Antiquity
  - Administrative reforms of Diocletian: 314
  - Arrival of Vandals: 429
  - Vandals sack Carthage: 439
- Political subdivisions: Africa proconsularis Byzacena; Numidia; Mauretania Sitifensis; Mauretania Caesariensis; Tripolitania
Succeeded by
Vandal Kingdom
- Today part of: Algeria; Tunisia; Libya

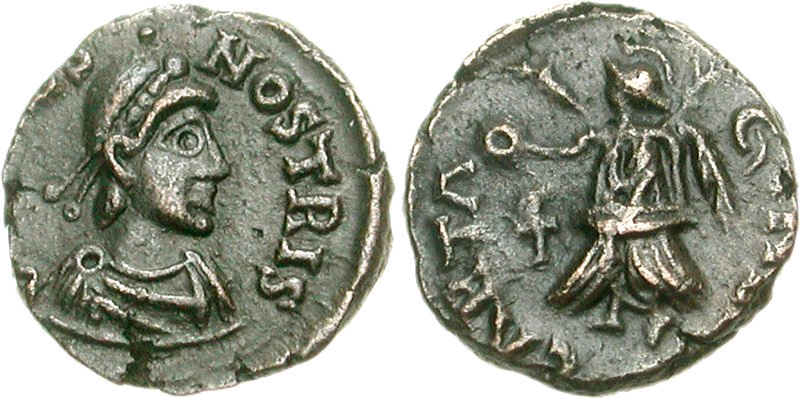
Coin of Bonifatius Comes Africae (422-431 CE).

The Diocese of Africa (Latin: Dioecesis Africae) was a diocese of the later Roman Empire, incorporating the provinces of North Africa, except Mauretania Tingitana. Its seat was at Carthage, and it was subordinate to the Praetorian prefecture of Italy.

The diocese included the provinces of Africa proconsularis (also known as Zeugitana), Byzacena, Mauretania Sitifensis, Mauretania Caesariensis, Numidia Cirtensis, Numidia Militiana and Tripolitania. In current geo-political terms, the Diocese of Africa included the entire coastline of Tunisia, Algeria with some mountainous hinterlands, plus the western half of Libya's coastline.

The diocese existed from the time of the Diocletianian and Constantinian reforms in the last years of the 3rd century until it was overrun by the Vandals in the 430s. The provincial organization were retained under the Vandals, and after their defeat and the reconquest of Africa by the Eastern Roman Empire in the Vandalic War, they were grouped anew, but this time in a praetorian prefecture.

== Sources ==
- R. Pierce Beaver (June 1936). "The Organization of the Church of Africa on the Eve of the Vandal Invasion". Church History. 5 (2). American Society of Church History: 68–181. doi:10.2307/3160527. JSTOR 3160527. S2CID 162653403.
