= Joannes =

Western Roman emperor from 423 to 425

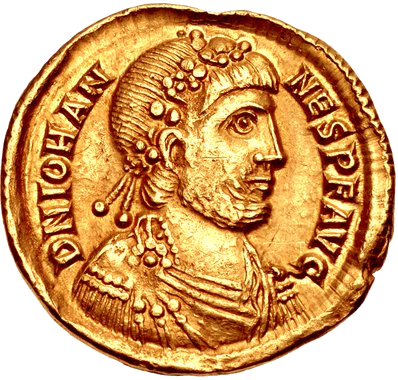
- Solidus of Joannes marked: d·n· iohannes p·f· aug·

Roman emperor in the West
- Reign: 20 November 423 – May 425
- Predecessor: Honorius
- Successor: Valentinian III
- Eastern emperor: Theodosius II
- Died: c. May 425; Aquileia
Names
- Iohannes

Joannes or Johannes (Note: rarely known as John.) (Latin: Iohannes; died 425) was Roman emperor in the West from 423 to 425. On the death of the Western emperor Honorius, Theodosius II, the last remaining ruler of the Theodosian dynasty, did not immediately announce a successor. In the interregnum, the patrician Castinus elevated Joannes as emperor. Theodosius refused to accept the decision, and deposed Joannes in a civil war.

== History ==
Joannes was a primicerius notariorum or senior civil servant at the time of his elevation. Procopius praised him as "both gentle and well-endowed with sagacity and thoroughly capable of valorous deeds."

From the beginning, his control over the empire was insecure. His praetorian prefect was slain in Gaul by an uprising of the soldiery at Arles, and Bonifacius, comes of the Diocese of Africa, held back the grain fleet destined to Rome.

"The events of Johannes' reign are as shadowy as its origins," writes John Matthews, who then provides a list of the ruler's known actions in a single paragraph. Joannes was proclaimed at Rome and praetorian games were provided at the expense of a member of the Anicia gens. Joannes then moved his base of operations to Ravenna, knowing full well that the Eastern Empire would strike from that direction. There is a mention of an expedition against Africa, but its fate, presumed unsuccessful, is unrecorded. In Gaul, he appears to have caused offense by submitting clerics to secular courts.

Joannes had hoped that he could come to an agreement with the Eastern Emperor, but when Theodosius II elevated the young Valentinian III to caesar (undoubtedly influenced by Valentinian's mother Galla Placidia), he knew he could only expect war. Late in 424, he gave to one of his younger and most promising followers, Aëtius, an important mission. Aëtius, governor of the Palace at the time, was sent to the Huns, with whom he had lived as a hostage earlier, to seek military help.

While Aëtius was away, the army of the Eastern Empire left Thessalonica for Italy, and soon camped in Aquileia. Although the primary sources state that Ravenna fell to their assault – John of Antioch states that a shepherd led the army of Aspar safely through the marshes that protected the city. Aspar's father, Ardaburius, who had been captured by Joannes' soldiers, may have convinced the garrison of Ravenna to betray the city. The fallen emperor was brought to Aquileia where first his hand was cut off, then he was paraded on a donkey in the Hippodrome to the insults of the populace. After further insults and injuries, Joannes was finally decapitated in mid 425. His death is sometimes dated to May or June, probably on the basis two laws in the Codex Theodosianus issued by Theodosius II on 5 May 425.

Three days after Joannes's death, Aëtius returned at the head of a substantial Hunnic army. After some skirmishing, Placidia, regent to her son, and Aëtius came to an agreement that established the political landscape of the Western Roman Empire for the next thirty years. The Huns were paid off and sent home, while Aëtius received the position of magister militum (commander-in-chief of the Roman army). The historian Adrian Goldsworthy writes that "it took a hard-fought campaign by strong elements of the East Roman army and navy, in addition to a fair dose of betrayal," to defeat Joannes.

== Notes ==
Regnal titles
Preceded by Honorius	Western Roman emperor 423–425	Succeeded by Valentinian III
Political offices
Preceded by Castinus; Victor	Roman consul 425	Succeeded by Theodosius Augustus; Valentinian Caesar
