= Prosper of Aquitaine =

5th-century Roman Christian writer

Saint Prosper of Aquitaine
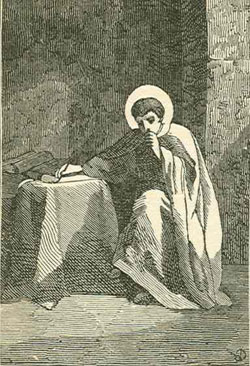

Church Father Theologian
- Born: c. 390; Roman province of Aquitaine
- Died: c. 455; Rome, Praet. prefecture of Italy
- Venerated in: Catholic Church; Eastern Orthodox Church; Anglican Communion; Lutheranism
- Feast: 25 June/7 July

Prosper of Aquitaine (Latin: Prosper Aquitanus; c. 390 – c. 455 AD), also called Prosper Tiro, was a Christian writer and disciple of Augustine of Hippo, and the first continuator of Jerome's Universal Chronicle. Particularly, Prosper is identified with the (later) axiom 'lex orandi, lex credendi, lex vivendi'—'the law [or those things] we pray is the law we believe is the law we live.

== Life ==
Prosper was a native of Aquitaine, and may have been educated at Bordeaux. By 417 he arrived in Marseille as a refugee from Aquitaine in the aftermath of the Gothic invasions of Gaul. In 429 he was corresponding with Augustine. In 431 he appeared in Rome to appeal to Pope Celestine I regarding the teachings of Augustine; there is no further trace of him until 440, the first year of the pontificate of Pope Leo I, who had been in Gaul, where he may have met Prosper. In any case Prosper was soon in Rome, attached to the pope in some secretarial or notarial capacity. Gennadius of Massilia's De viris illustribus (lxxxiv, 89) repeats the tradition that Prosper emanuensed the famous letters of Leo I against Eutyches. The date of his death is not known, but his chronicle goes as far as 455, and the fact that the chronicler Marcellinus mentions him under the year 463 seems to indicate that his death was shortly after that date.

Prosper was a layman, but he threw himself with ardour into the religious controversies of his day, defending Augustine and propagating orthodoxy. In his De vocatione omnium gentium ("The Call of all Nations"), in which the issues of the call to the Gentiles is discussed in the light of Augustine's doctrine of Grace, Prosper appears as the first of the medieval Augustinians.

The Pelagians were attacked in a glowing polemical poem of about 1000 lines, Adversus ingratos, written about 430. The theme, dogma quod ... pestifero vomuit coluber sermone Britannus, is relieved by a treatment not lacking in liveliness and in classical measures. After Augustine's death he wrote three series of Augustinian defences, especially against Vincent of Lérins (Pro Augustino responsiones).

His chief work was his De gratia Dei et libero arbitrio (432), written against John Cassian's Collatio. He also induced Pope Celestine to publish an open letter to the bishops of Gaul, Epistola ad episcopos Gallorum against some members of the Gaulish Church. He had earlier opened a correspondence with Augustine, along with his friend Hilary (not Hilary of Arles), and although he did not meet him personally, his enthusiasm for the great theologian led him to make an abridgment of his commentary on the Psalms, as well as a collection of sentences from his works—probably the first dogmatic compilation of that class in which Peter Lombard's Liber sententiarum is the best-known example. He also put into elegiac metre, in 106 epigrams, some of Augustine's theological dicta.

Far more important historically than these is Prosper's Epitoma chronicon (covering the period 379–455) which Prosper first composed in 433 and updated several times, finally in 455. It was circulated in numerous manuscripts and was soon continued by other hands, whose beginning dates identify Prosper's various circulated editions. The Encyclopædia Britannica 1911 found it a careless compilation from Jerome in the earlier part, and from other writers in the later, but that the lack of other sources makes it very valuable for the period from 425 to 455, which is drawn from Prosper's personal experience. Compared with his continuators, Prosper gives detailed coverage of political events. He covers Attila's invasions of Gaul (451) and Italy (452) in lengthy entries under their respective years. Though he was a poet himself, the sole secular writer Prosper mentions is Claudian. There were five different editions, the last of them dating from 455, just after the death of Valentinian III.

For a long time the Chronicon imperiale was wrongly attributed to him. It is entirely independent of the real Prosper, and in parts even shows Pelagian tendencies and sympathies.

== Writings ==
Prosper of Aquitaine's most influential writings are admired for their classical qualities, but have been criticized for being flat and dull. His writings come mostly from the second quarter of the fifth century.

De vocatione omnium gentium (Calling of All Nations)

This was Prosper's attempt to reconcile Augustine of Hippo's teaching on grace in which he suggests that God wishes all men to be saved. The argument is that although all human beings do not receive the grace that saves, they do receive God's general grace. Written in AD 450, the Calling of All Nations was Prosper's most original contribution to theology.

Epitoma Chronicon

This was Prosper's version of the history of the World. In it he sought to give his own version of the Pelagian controversy and in his own interpretation of recent history. The Epitoma Chronicon ends in 455.

Capitulla

This was a simple list of ten doctrinal points asserting the efficacy and necessity of God's Grace, each separately supported by papal statements. It was a strong defense of an essential Augustinian doctrine, but most moderate one to its date. Prosper did not mention Augustine's name in the doctrine, but also did not reject any of his thoughts on predestination. It was written between 435 and 442.

Sententia and Epigrammata

The Sententia was a collection of 392 maxims drawn up against the writings of Augustine of Hippo. The epigrammata was a compilation of 106 epigrams of florilegium in verse. Both were intended to be used as handbooks for the serious Christian, drawn from an Augustinian point of view. The work was devoted to the discussion of doctrines of grace and the incarnation. The motto of the florilegia was monastically influenced, urging the reader to patience through adversity, exercise of virtue, and constant striving to perfection.

Liber contra Collatorem

This writing represents the final opinion of Prosper on the problem of necessity of grace. It was written during the reign of Pope Sixtus III and is a step-by-step response to Conference XIII of the Conlationes of John Cassian.

Carmen de Providentia Divina (Poem on Divine Providence)

The problem of providence is discussed in the context of God's creation of the World and in relation to the invasion of Gaul by the Vandals and the Goths. This work has been attributed to Prosper of Aquitaine in the past, but this theory has been discredited.

== Legacy ==
"Prosper of Aquitaine was much more famous for what he wrote than for what he did." (Abbé L. Valentin) However, many historians believe his chief fame rests not on his historical work, but on his activities as a theologian and an aggressive propagator of the Augustinian doctrine of grace. It is no doubt that Prosper holds a place in the ranks of the moulders of theological understanding of the doctrine of grace.

Most of his works were aimed at defending and distributing Augustine's teachings, especially those pertaining to grace and free will. Following Augustine's death in 430, Prosper continued to disseminate his teachings and spent his life working to make them acceptable. Prosper was the first chronicler to add to Jerome's account, beginning his continuation half a century later. Prosper's epigrams became most popular in his later years, providing a method for students of Christianity to learn moral lessons and aspects of the Augustinian doctrine.

Prosper also played a vital role in the Pelagian controversy in southern Gaul in the 420's. With the help of Augustine and Pope Celestine, Prosper was able to put down revolutions of the Pelagian Christians.

Prosper's works were very popular during the Middle Ages: the Epigrams alone sum no fewer than one hundred and eighty manuscripts.

== Editions ==
Prosper's Epitoma Chronicon was edited by Theodor Mommsen in the Chronica minora of the Monumenta Germaniae Historica (1892) and by Maria Becker and Jan–Markus Kötter as part of the Kleine und fragmentarische Historiker der Spätantike (KFHist G 5) (2016). Prosper's complete works are in Migne's Patrologia Latina. vol. 51. The English translations include:

- St. Prosper of Aquitaine. The Call of All Nations, translated and annotated by P. De Letter, SJ, 1952 (Ancient Christian Writers, 14). ISBN 9780809102532
- Prosper of Aquitaine. Defense of St. Augustine, translated and annotated by P. De Letter, SJ, 1963 (Ancient Christian Writers, 32). ISBN 9780809102631

Prosper's Epitoma Chronicon is available in English translation in From Roman to Merovingian Gaul: A Reader ed. & trans. A. C Murray (Ontario, 2003) pp. 62–76.

Prosper's Epigrams were edited by Albertus G. A. Horsting in Prosper Aquitanus. Liber epigrammatum, Berlin-New York 2016 (Corpus scriptorum ecclesiasticorum Latinorum 100).

== See also ==
- Uncial 0208
