= Wang Hong (politician, born 379) =

Liu Song dynasty prime minister (379–432)

Wang Hong (Chinese: 王弘; 379 (Note: Wang Hong's biography in Book of Song recorded that he was 54 (by East Asian reckoning) when he died.) – 12 July 432 (Note: The Zizhi Tongjian recorded that Wang Hong died on the ren'shen day of the 5th month of the 9th year of the Yuan'jia era of the reign of Emperor Wen.)), courtesy name Xiuyuan (休元), posthumous name Duke Wenzhao of Huarong (華容文昭公), was an official of the Chinese Eastern Jin and Liu Song dynasties. Under the Liu Song dynasty, he served during the reigns of Emperor Wu, Emperor Shao, and Emperor Wen, becoming chancellor during Emperor Wen's reign.

== During Jin dynasty ==
Wang Hong was a great-grandson of the famed Jin prime minister Wang Dao. His father Wang Xun served as prime minister during the reign of Emperor Xiaowu of Jin, although he lost much of his power after Emperor Xiaowu's death. During Emperor An's reign, when Emperor Xiaowu's brother and Emperor An's uncle Sima Daozi, Prince of Kuaiji, served as regent, Wang Hong served on his staff, and, impressed with Wang Hong's suggestions, Sima Daozi wanted to promote him, but Wang Xun, believing his son to be too young for greater posts (Note: Sima Daozi's regency lasted from 397 to 399, so Wang Hong would be about 18 to 20 years old at this point.), declined on his son's behalf. Wang Xun had been very interested in financial matters and earned much money from investments, including loans to commoners, and after his death in 400, Wang Hong burned all of the promissory notes to forgive those commoners' debts. During his three-year mourning period, Sima Daozi's son Sima Yuanxian, who succeeded his father as regent, tried to have him come out of his mourning period and serve as a general, but he repeatedly declined invitations by both Sima Yuanxian and Sima Daozi. After the warlord Huan Xuan defeated and killed Sima Yuanxian in 402 and arrested and exiled Sima Daozi, most of Sima Daozi's old associates did not dare to see him off at the dock of the capital Jiankang, but Wang Hong arrived to do so, and was praised for his faithfulness.

After Huan Xuan seized the throne in 403 and established a new state of Chu, Liu Yu rose in rebellion in 404 to try to reestablish Jin, and Wang joined Liu Yu's army. After Huan Xuan was defeated and killed, Wang was created the Marquess of Huarong in recognition of his contributions. He later successively served as the governor of several commanderies, and he accompanied Liu Yu on his campaign against Later Qin in 416. After Liu Yu took the important city Luoyang, he sent Wang back to Jiankang to pressure Emperor An into granting him the nine bestowments, surprising Liu Yu's chief assistant Liu Muzhi, who had been left in charge of the capital that he was not informed first. Liu Muzhi, in fear and anger, died. Initially, Liu Yu wanted to have Wang succeed Liu Muzhi, but at the recommendation of other officials had Xu Xianzhi replace Liu Muzhi instead. Wang became the governor of the strategically important Pengcheng Commandery (彭城, roughly modern Xuzhou, Jiangsu) instead. While at that post, he wrote articles of impeachment against the official Xie Lingyun, a talented poet who was however inattentive to his responsibilities, leading to Liu Yu's removal of Xie from his posts. In 418, Liu Yu made him the governor of Jiang Province (江州, modern Jiangxi and Fujian), and he was said to be a capable governor.

== During Emperor Wu's and Emperor Shao's reigns ==
After Liu Yu seized the throne from Emperor Gong of Jin in 420, ending Jin and establishing Liu Song (as Emperor Wu), he created Wang Hong the Duke of Huarong. Wang briefly visited the capital Jiankang in 422, but then was returned to his post at Jiang Province, and he was not one of the officials whom Emperor Wu entrusted his son and crown prince Liu Yifu to before he died later that year, and Wang did not appear to have increased authority after Liu Yifu took the throne as Emperor Shao. Rather, authority vested in the hands of Xu Xianzhi, Fu Liang, and Xie Hui.

In 424, Xu, Fu, Xie, dissatisfied with Emperor Shao's tendencies to trust people lacking virtues and believing him to be unfit to be emperor, resolved to depose him. Because they were apprehensive about the powerful armies that Tan Daoji and Wang had, they summoned Tan and Wang to the capital and then informed them of the plot. They then sent soldiers into the palace to arrest Emperor Shao, after first persuading the imperial guards not to resist. Before Emperor Shao could get up from bed in the morning, the soldiers were already in his bedchamber, and he made a futile attempt to resist, but was captured. He was sent back to his old palace. The officials then, in the name of Emperor Shao's mother Empress Dowager Zhang, declared Emperor Shao's faults and demoted him to Prince of Yingyang, offering the throne to his younger brother Liu Yilong the Prince of Yidu instead. Liu Yilong, after some hesitation, took the throne as Emperor Wen.

== During Emperor Wen's reign ==
Emperor Wen tried to pacify the officials who made him emperor by giving them greater titles and fiefs, and he tried to create Wang the Duke of Jian'an (a commandery, as opposed to the county that he was the duke of), but Wang insisted on refusing both that title and greater offices that Emperor Wen conferred on him.

Emperor Wen, angry that Xu, Fu, and Xie had, immediately after they deposed Emperor Shao, assassinated both Emperor Shao and another brother of his, Liu Yizhen (劉義真) the Prince of Luling, had Xu and Fu arrested and killed in 426, and declared Xie, then the governor of Jing Province (荊州, modern Hubei) a renegade. Believing that neither Tan nor Wang was involved in the plot to depose and kill Emperor Shao, (Note: This was perhaps because Wang Hong's brother Wang Tanshou (王曇首) was a trusted advisor of his and presumably told him about Wang Hong's lack of involvement in the plot) he summoned them to the capital, and he made Wang Hong prime minister and the governor of the capital region Yang Province (揚州, modern Zhejiang and southern Jiangsu). Later that year, Tan, who was put in charge of the army, defeated Xie.

In 428, Wang Hong, believing that the powers that he and his brother Wang Tanshou possessed were too great and that this would bring jealousy and disaster, recommended to Emperor Wen that he recall his brother Liu Yikang the Prince of Pengcheng to the capital to share the responsibility. Emperor Wen agreed, and Wang Hong then offered to resign. Emperor Wen did not accept his resignation but did transfer some of Wang Hong's responsibilities to Liu Yikang. However, Liu Yikang later grew increasingly impatient, complaining in particular that Wang Hong was frequently ill and cannot govern from his sickbed. Wang was able to placate Liu Yikang by transferring some of his staff members to Liu Yikang's staff. Wang Hong died in July 432, and Liu Yikang took over the prime minister post officially thereafter.

Historians commented that Wang Hong was intelligent and open-minded, but was also often arrogant and frivolous, and this hurt his reputation. Consistent with what he did with his father's promissory notes, Wang left his household with relatively little property, and upon hearing this, Emperor Wen awarded his family a large grant.
