= 426 =

426 in various calendars
Gregorian calendar	426; CDXXVI
Ab urbe condita	1179
Assyrian calendar	5176
Balinese saka calendar	347–348
Bengali calendar	−168 – −167
Berber calendar	1376
Buddhist calendar	970
Burmese calendar	−212
Byzantine calendar	5934–5935
Chinese calendar	乙丑年 (Wood Ox); 3123 or 2916 — to — 丙寅年 (Fire Tiger); 3124 or 2917
Coptic calendar	142–143
Discordian calendar	1592
Ethiopian calendar	418–419
Hebrew calendar	4186–4187
- Hindu calendars
Vikram Samvat	482–483
Shaka Samvat	347–348
Kali Yuga	3526–3527
Holocene calendar	10426
Iranian calendar	196 BP – 195 BP
Islamic calendar	202 BH – 201 BH
Javanese calendar	310–311
Julian calendar	426; CDXXVI
Korean calendar	2759
Minguo calendar	1486 before ROC 民前1486年
Nanakshahi calendar	−1042
Seleucid era	737/738 AG
Thai solar calendar	968–969
Tibetan calendar	ཤིང་མོ་གླང་ལོ་ (female Wood-Ox); 552 or 171 or −601 — to — མེ་ཕོ་སྟག་ལོ་ (male Fire-Tiger); 553 or 172 or −600

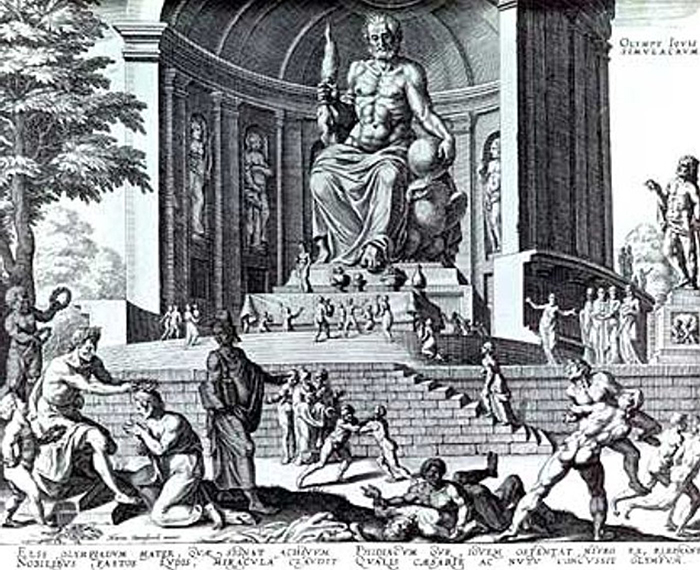
Statue of Zeus, by Heemskerck (1572)

Year 426 (CDXXVI) was a common year starting on Friday of the Julian calendar. At the time, it was known in Rome as the Year of the Consulship of Theodosius and Valentinianus (or, less frequently, year 1179 Ab urbe condita). The denomination 426 for this year has been used since the early medieval period, when the Anno Domini calendar era became the prevalent method in Europe for naming years.

== Events ==
=== By place ===
==== Europe ====
- Flavius Aetius, Roman general (magister militum), ends the Gothic revolt of Theodoric I in southern Gaul.
- Rex Flavius Gundericus of the Vandals accepts the request of the Alans in Hispania to become their ruler (approximate date).

==== Mesoamerica ====
- K'inich Yax K'uk' Mo' becomes the founder of the pre-Columbian Maya civilization at Copán (modern Honduras).

==== Religion ====
- Augustine of Hippo publishes the De Civitate Dei, City of God.
- Sisinnius becomes Archbishop of Constantinople.

== Births ==
- Liu Shao, emperor of the Liu Song Dynasty (d. 453)

== Deaths ==
- Fu Liang, official of the Liu Song Dynasty (b. 374)
- Xie Hui, general of the Liu Song Dynasty (b. 390)
- Xu Xianzhi, official of the Liu Song Dynasty (b. 364)
- Zhang, empress dowager of the Liu Song Dynasty
