= Grand Progenitor =

Grand Progenitor or Supreme Progenitor is an East Asian temple name. It may refer to:

- Taizu (disambiguation) - Chinese temple name
- Taejo (disambiguation) - Korean temple name
- Thái Tổ (disambiguation) - Vietnamese temple name
