= Yizhan Jian =

- 乙旃建

Senior General Who Guards the South (征南大將軍)
- In office 430–437
- Monarch: Emperor Taiwu of Northern Wei

Personal details
- Born: 365 Yu County, Hebei
- Died: 437
- Children: Yizhan Jun; Yizhan Liang
- Parent: Yizhan Gu (father)
- Han name: Shusun Jian (叔孫建)
- Peerage: Prince of Danyang (丹陽王)
- Posthumous name: Xiang (襄)

Yizhan Jian (365–437), also known as Yizhan Fannengjian (乙旃幡能健), Han name Shusun Jian, was a military general of the Northern Wei during the Northern and Southern dynasties period. He was an early confidant of the future Emperor Daowu, Tuoba Gui, and after the establishment of Northern Wei, he was appointed as a high-ranking minister and envoy. He later became a key general during the reigns of Emperor Mingyuan and Emperor Taiwu, helping seize territory south of the Yellow River during the Henan campaign of 422–423 and repelling the Liu Song general, Tan Daoji in 431.

== Early life and career ==
Yizhan Jian was a native of Dai Commandery and the son of Yizhan Gu (乙旃骨). When the Tuoba clan ruled the Dai Kingdom, his father was raised by Lady Murong (慕容氏), the principal wife of the King of Dai, Tuoba Shiyiqian, and enjoyed equal status to that of an imperial clan member. After Dai fell to the Former Qin in 376, Yizhan Jian accompanied Shiyiqian's grandson, Tuoba Gui to live with the Helan tribe.

In 386, during the collapse of Former Qin, Tuoba Gui restored his state as the Northern Wei dynasty. Yizhan Jian was appointed as a Chief of the Outer Court, participating and managing military and state affairs alongside thirteen other ministers, including An Tong. In 391, he followed the Prince of Qin, Tuoba Gu (拓跋觚) on a mission to the Later Yan. After six years as an envoy, he returned to Wei where was appointed as an Inspector of Waterworks, Commandant of the Central Army and Prancing Dragon General and bestowed the fiefly title of Duke of Anping. He was then commissioned as Inspector of Bing province, but was later removed from his office and titles due to official matters and sent to guard the city parks of Ye instead.

== Service under Emperor Mingyuan ==
=== Suppressing Liu Hu ===
After Emperor Mingyuan ascended the throne in 409, he rewarded Yizhan Jian's past contributions by appointing him as Upright General and Inspector of Xiang province. In 415, the Hu people from Hexi rebelled in Shangdang Commandery due to a famine and acclaimed Liu Hu (劉虎) as the King of Lüshan (率善王). Emperor Mingyuan originally sent his general, Gongsun Biao to quell the uprising, but Gongsun was badly defeat. The minister, Cui Hong recommended Yizhan Jian to replace Gongsun in the commanding role, pointing out his fearsome reputation among the Han Chinese and ethnic tribes in Bing province from his tenure in the region. Emperor Mingyuan agreed and reappointed Yizhan as Commandant of the Central Army while also restoring his peerage of Duke of Anping. Yizhan then led Gongsun and the others in successfully pacifying Liu Hu the following year.

=== Liu Yu's Northern Expedition ===
Later in 416, the Eastern Jin commander, Liu Yu, brought his forces from the south to conquer the Later Qin dynasty. While his navy under Wang Zhongde was sailing into the Yellow River, the Northern Wei Inspector of Yan province, Yuchi Jian (尉遲建), fearing that he was being invaded, abandoned his city of Huatai (滑台, in modern Anyang, Henan) and fled out of fear, allowing Wang to occupy the city without bloodshed. Emperor Mingyuan responded by ordering Yizhan Jian to rush from Henan to Fangtou (枋頭, in modern Hebi, Henan) to observe the area.

After a month, Mingyuan sent Yizhan and Gongsun Biao to cross south of the Yellow River to kill Yuchi Jian and dump his body into the river. Yizhan then accused Wang Zhongde of encroaching into Wei territory, but Wang explained that he no such intention, that he was only using their passage to march into Later Qin and that Huatai was already empty when he arrived. Subsequently, Yizhan personally visited Liu Yu, who apologized and reaffirmed that he had no intention of attacking Wei.

Nonetheless, Emperor Mingyuan remained suspicious of Liu Yu, which led to a clash along the Yellow River that ended in a heavy Wei defeat in 417. As Liu Yu's forces continued westward, Mingyuan entrusted Yizhan Jian and Baba Song with elite troops to monitor the situation. Yizhan and Baba crossed south of Yellow River, and when Liu Yu entered the Guanzhong region, they marched further south form Chenggao (成皋; near present-day Xingyang, Henan) to raid Pengcheng and Pei. Many of the Jin soldiers scattered and fled when they saw the Wei army, but as Liu Yu destroyed the Later Qin later that year, they were eventually forced to withdraw.

Yizhan returned to his post and was later transferred to guard Ye. Not long after, he and several of his fellow generals campaigned in the western hills of Ding province (定州, roughly modern Baoding, Hebei), where they vanquished the Dingling leaders, Zhai Shu (翟蜀), Luo Zhi (洛支) and others. The following year, he was moved to Garrison General of Guang'a. During his tenure, he suppressed and eliminated the local bandit groups, which garnered him a great reputation.

=== Henan campaign ===
In 422, Liu Yu, two years after he established the Liu Song dynasty, died and was succeeded by his 16-year-old son, Emperor Shao. Taking advantage of the situation, Emperor Mingyuan launched a southward campaign, appointing Yizhan Jian as the Chief Controller of the Vanguard, General of the Chu Army and Inspector of Xu province. Yizhan led his forces across the Yellow River from Pingyuan to invade Yan and Qing provinces. The Liu Song Inspector of Yan, Xu Yan (徐琰), abandoned his city and fled to Pengcheng as Yizhan's army crossed the river, allowing him to capture the commanderies of Taishan, Gaoping (高平; around present-day Jinxiang County, Shandong) and Jinxiang among others. Yizhan then turned his attention of Qing province, and in 423, he captured the key city of Linzi. He also received the surrender of Sima Xiuzhi (司馬秀之) and Sima Shouzhi (司馬受之) east of the Ji river, and was welcomed by 2,000 men under the native of Qinghe, Zhang Xing (張幸) along the Nü River (女水; southeast of present-day Linzi, Shandong).

The Liu Song Inspector of Qing province, Zhu Kui (竺夔) continued to resist at Dongyang (東陽; in present-day Qingzhou, Shandong), employing a scorched-earth policy. Yizhan's forces were unable to replenish their supplies, so Emperor Mingyuan sent a respected figure from Qing province, Diao Yong (刁雍) to help him recruit soldiers in the region. Yizhan then led 30,000 cavalry to attack Dongyang, and though Zhu Kui's soldiers resisted fiercely, the prolonged siege began to wear them down. The Wei forces eventually breached the northern city wall, but Yizhan refused to rush in despite Diao Yong's advice. Meanwhile, Song reinforcements under general, Tan Daoji was fast approaching, and many of the Wei soldiers were suffering from disease due to the summer heat. In the end, Yizhan decided to burn his camp and siege equipments before retreating. Tan Daoji attempted to pursue him, but also ran out of supplies, allowing Yizhan to escape.

Yizhan then led his army west from Huatai to reinforce Daxi Jin, who had been besieging the Song general, Mao Dezu at Hulao for nearly a year. Hulao soon fell, and as the campaign came to a conclusion, Yizhan Jian was awared the title of Marquis of Shouguang and appointed the General Who Guards the South for his merits.

== Service under Emperor Taiwu ==
=== First Yuanjia Northern Expedition ===
After Emperor Mingyuan died in 423, Yizhan Jian rendered service to his son and successor, Emperor Taiwu. In 429, the Dingling people, with over 2,000 families including Xianyu Taiyang (鮮于台陽) and Zhai Qiao (翟喬) in Ding province, rebelled and ravaged the counties and commanderies of the western hills. Yizhan Jian once again led his troops to suppress them.

In 430, Liu Song forces under Dao Yanzhi carried out a northern expedition against the Wei. Emperor Taiwu ordered his forces to evacuate the Henan region for Hebei, abandoning Huatai, Qu'ao (碻磝; in present-day Chiping, Shandong), Luoyang and Hulao. Not long after, Yizhan Jian submitted a memorial to Emperor Taiwu, offering to lead the counterattack. The emperor was pleased, rewarding Yizhan with horses and clothes. When winter arrived and the Yellow River froze, Yizhan Jian and Baba Daosheng were ordered to cross south of the river. Their forces quickly reclaimed Luoyang and Hulao before placing Huatai under siege. The sudden loss of Hulao and his own failing health prompted Dao Yanzhi to issue a retreat. The Song Inspector of Yan province, Zhu Lingxiu (竺靈秀) also abandoned Xuchang, but Yizhan Jian lifted the siege of Huatai and pursued him south, killing him at Hulu (湖陸; in present-day Yutai County, Shandong) along with over 5,000 of his men.

Yizhan Jian then advanced to the Zou-Lu region (鄒魯; around Zoucheng and Qufu in Shandong) before turning back to Fancheng (范城; in present-day Fan County, Henan). Around this time, he was transferred to Garrison General of Pingyuan and enfeoffed as the Prince of Danyang. He was also appointed as Senior General Who Attacks the South and Chief Controller of military affairs in the four provinces of Ji, Qing, Xu and Ji. In 431, the Wei army attacked Huatai again, and Song forces led by Tan Daoji went to reinforce the city. Tan defeated Yizhan Jian at Shouzhang (壽張; south of present-day Dongping County, Shandong), and proceeded to fight more than thirty battles with the Wei forces, winning most of them. However, when Tan arrived at Licheng, Yizhan Jian and Baba Daosheng divided their cavalry and attacked the Song army from the front and rear. Yizhan also burned down Tan's grain suppply, preventing the Song army from advancing any further. With Tan's reinforcements isolated at Licheng, Huatai soon fell back into Wei control.

=== Death and posthumous honours ===
Throughout his military career, Yizhan Jian garnered respect from the frontier people for his military mind and contributions, as well as his strong rapport with talents and scholars. The Book of Wei appraised him by stating that only few of the early Northern Wei generals could rival, and that the southerners rarely raided Qing and Yan provinces out of fear of Yizhan Jian. In 437, Yizhan Jian died of old age. Emperor Taiwu deeply mourned his death, posthumously awarding him the name "Xiang" and ordering his burial at Jinling (金陵; location unknown).
