= Thái Tổ =

- Vietnamese alphabet: Thái Tổ
- Chữ Hán: 太祖
- Literal meaning: Grand Ancestor

Thái Tổ is an imperial temple name typically used for Vietnamese emperors who founded a particular dynasty. The term was derived from the Chinese equivalent Tàizǔ. It may refer to:

- Lý Thái Tổ (1009-1028), born Lý Công Uẩn, founder of the Lý dynasty
- Trần Thái Tổ (1225-1234), born Trần Thừa, founder of the Trần dynasty
- Lê Thái Tổ (1428-1433), born Lê Lợi, founder of the Lê dynasty
- Mạc Thái Tổ (1527-1529), born Mạc Đăng Dung, founder of the Mạc dynasty
- Nguyễn Hoàng (1558-1613), the first of the Nguyễn lords and an ancestor of the Nguyễn dynasty
- Nguyễn Huệ (1753–1792), or the Quang Trung Emperor, second emperor of the Tây Sơn dynasty

== See also ==
- Gaozu (disambiguation) (similar meaning; some emperors have been called both)
- Taejo (disambiguation) (Korean equivalent)
- Taizu (disambiguation) (Chinese equivalent)
