= 374 =

374 in various calendars
- Gregorian calendar: 374; CCCLXXIV
- Ab urbe condita: 1127
- Assyrian calendar: 5124
- Balinese saka calendar: 295–296
- Bengali calendar: −220 – −219
- Berber calendar: 1324
- Buddhist calendar: 918
- Burmese calendar: −264
- Byzantine calendar: 5882–5883
- Chinese calendar: 癸酉年 (Water Rooster); 3071 or 2864 — to — 甲戌年 (Wood Dog); 3072 or 2865
- Coptic calendar: 90–91
- Discordian calendar: 1540
- Ethiopian calendar: 366–367
- Hebrew calendar: 4134–4135
- Hindu calendars
- Vikram Samvat: 430–431
- Shaka Samvat: 295–296
- Kali Yuga: 3474–3475
- Holocene calendar: 10374
- Iranian calendar: 248 BP – 247 BP
- Islamic calendar: 256 BH – 255 BH
- Javanese calendar: 256–257
- Julian calendar: 374; CCCLXXIV
- Korean calendar: 2707
- Minguo calendar: 1538 before ROC 民前1538年
- Nanakshahi calendar: −1094
- Seleucid era: 685/686 AG
- Thai solar calendar: 916–917
- Tibetan calendar: ཆུ་མོ་བྱ་ལོ་ (female Water-Bird); 500 or 119 or −653 — to — ཤིང་ཕོ་ཁྱི་ལོ་ (male Wood-Dog); 501 or 120 or −652

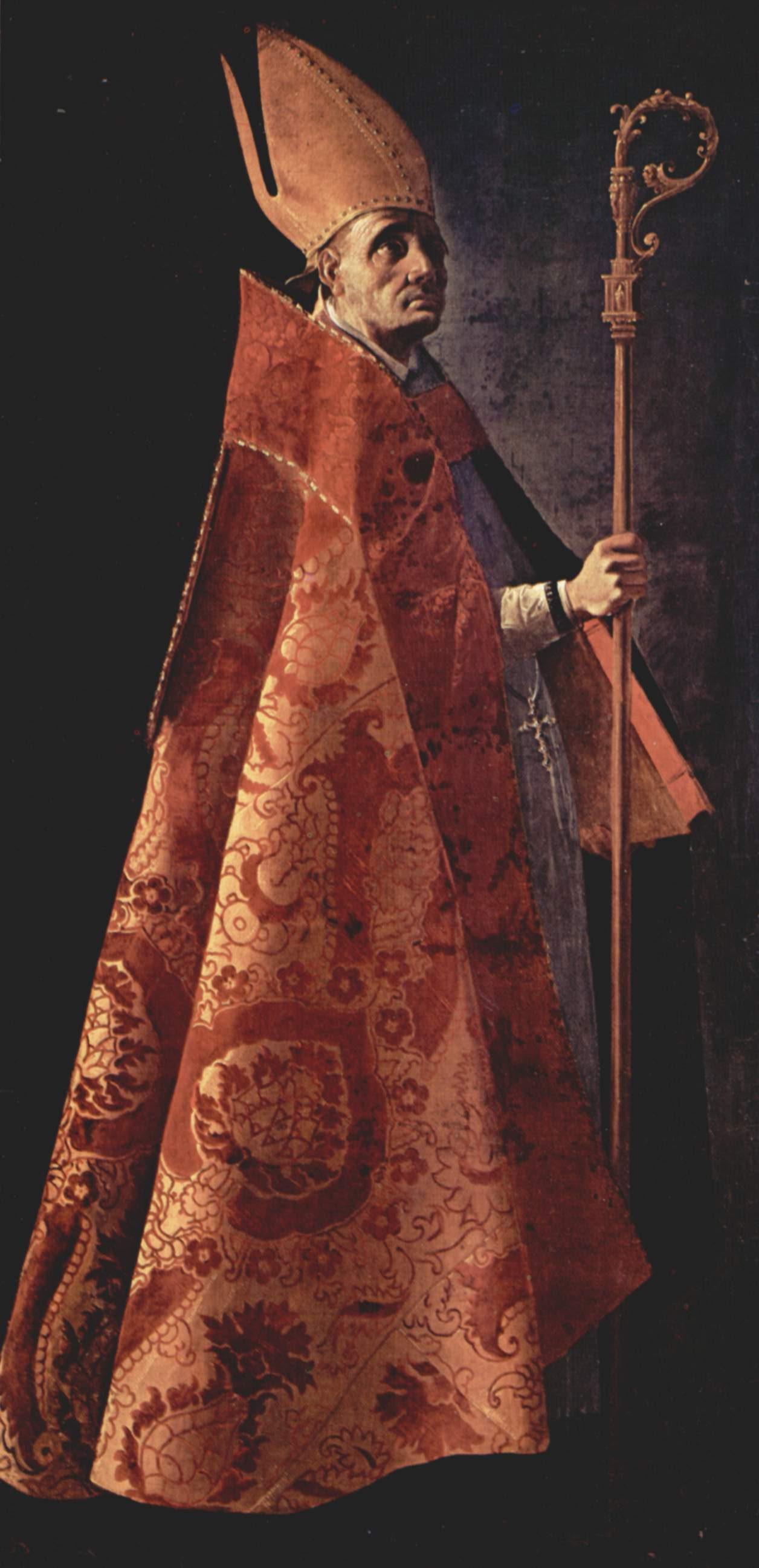
Ambrosius by Francisco de Zurbarán

Year 374 (CCCLXXIV) was a common year starting on Wednesday of the Julian calendar. At the time, it was known as the Year of the Consulship of Augustus and Equitius (or, less frequently, year 1127 Ab urbe condita). The denomination 374 for this year has been used since the early medieval period, when the Anno Domini calendar era became the prevalent method in Europe for naming years.

== Events ==
=== By place ===
==== Roman Empire ====
- The Quadi cross the Danube and begin ravaging Pannonia. They avoid the fortified cities and plunder the unprotected countryside.

==== Mesoamerica ====
- May 4 – Spearthrower Owl ascends to the throne and becomes ruler of Teotihuacan (Mexico).

=== By topic ===
==== Religion ====
- December 7 – The people of Milan astonish Ambrosius, governor of Aemilia-Liguria, by acclaiming him bishop. He is the second son of the former praetorian prefect of Gaul, and becomes a creative thinker whose ideas will provide the paradigm for medieval church-state relations.

== Births ==
- Fu Liang (or Jiyou), Chinese official and politician (d. 426)
- Gwanggaeto the Great, Korean king of Goguryeo (d. 412)

== Deaths ==
- January 2 – Gregory the Elder, Christian bishop and saint (b. 276)
- April 20 – Marcellinus of Gaul (or Marcellin), Christian bishop
- November 17 – Pap of Armenia (or Papas), king of Armenia
- Auxentius of Milan, Christian bishop and theologian
- Marcellus of Ancyra, Christian bishop and saint
- Pushyavarman, Indian ruler of Kamarupa
