= Liu Yikang =

Liu Yikang (劉義康) (409 – February or March 451), nickname Chezi (車子), was an imperial prince of the Chinese Liu Song dynasty. He was a son of Emperor Wu (Liu Yu) and served as prime minister during the reign of his brother Emperor Wen. He was considered to be diligent and capable, but eventually became entangled in plots to have him succeed Emperor Wen, and he was removed from his post and eventually killed.

== Background ==
Liu Yikang was born in 409, while his father Liu Yu was the regent for Jin, as Liu Yu's fourth son. His mother was Liu Yu's concubine Consort Wang, who later carried the rank Xiurong (修容). His involvement in government service started in 420, when Liu Yu, on the verge of usurping the Jin throne, left his post at Shouyang (壽陽, in modern Lu'an, Anhui) and made Liu Yikang titularly in charge of Shouyang as the governor of Yu Province (豫州, modern central Anhui and southeastern Henan). However, Liu Dan (劉湛) served as his secretary and was actually in charge of the province. Later that year, when Liu Yu took the throne from Emperor Gong of Jin, ending Jin and establishing Liu Song as Emperor Wu, he created Liu Yikang as the Prince of Pengcheng.

In 426, after Emperor Wen had defeated and killed Xie Hui the governor of the important Jing Province (荊州, modern Hubei), for having deposed and killed his older brother Emperor Shao in 424, he made Liu Yikang the governor of Jing Province to replace Xie. Liu Yikang was described as capable and intelligent, and he governed Jing Province well. The prime minister Wang Hong, who had tried to avoid having too much power, therefore offered to resign and have the post be given to Liu Yikang. While Emperor Wen refused, in 427, Emperor Wen did recall Liu Yikang to the capital Jiankang and transferred some of Wang's authorities to him. Because Wang was often ill and further wished to avoid exercising power, Liu Yikang became effectively in charge of the government, although he was not formally given all of Wang's authorities until Wang's death in 432.

== As prime minister ==
Liu Yikang was diligent in serving as prime minister for his brother, and particularly because Emperor Wen was often ill, Liu Yikang made many important decisions. The historian Shen Yue, in Song Shu, described Liu Yikang's service as prime minister as such:

Yikang liked executive work, and he was careful in both reading official submissions and examining plans. He took over all matters of the government and made decisions on his own, including matters of life and death. Whatever he opined would be accepted by the emperor, and provincial governors were all commissioned by him. His powers were such that everyone feared him. Yikang himself was also strong and diligent. There would often been hundreds of visitors' wagons outside his mansion each time, and he personally greeted the visitors, no matter how lowly they were. He was also more intelligent than others with excellent memory, and he remembered all he heard or read for the rest of his life.

Liu Yikang was further described as being very dedicated to Emperor Wen in his illness, spending day and night with his brother. However, he was also described as not having studied enough and been aware that certain actions were inappropriate. He engaged able officials to be his assistants while making the less capable officials serve in other agencies. He also set up a guard corps of 6,000 men without getting prior approval, and did not see that it was inappropriate for him to accept gifts from other officials—gifts that were even more exquisite than the ones Emperor Wen received.

Liu Yikang trusted Liu Dan greatly, and since Liu Dan wanted to replace a trusted advisor of Emperor Wen, Yin Jingren (殷景仁), in importance, he flattered Liu Yikang greatly, causing Liu Yikang to be so arrogant that he was no longer acting toward Emperor Wen as if he were a subject, and Emperor Wen became secretly displeased. (It was also at Liu Dan's urging that Liu Yikang, during Emperor Wen's illness in 436, arrested and executed the famed general Tan Daoji, fearing that if Emperor Wen had died, no one would be able to control Tan.) Once, when Emperor Wen appeared near death, he commissioned Liu Yikang to be the regent for the crown prince Liu Shao. Liu Yikang was very touched by this commission, but Liu Dan instead, along with several other associates of Liu Yikang, including Liu Bin (劉斌), Wang Lü (王履), Liu Jingwen (劉敬文), and Kong Yinxiu (孔胤秀), secretly considered making Liu Yikang emperor against Emperor Wen's wishes. Once Emperor Wen recovered, he received news of this, and he suspected Liu Yikang to be complicit. By the fall of 439, he no longer visited Liu Yikang's mansion—something he often did in the past.

In 440, finally certain that he wanted to remove Liu Yikang, Emperor Wen had his brother put under house arrest, and arrested Liu Dan and several other associates of Liu Yikang and put them to death. He then removed Liu Yikang from his post as prime minister and made him the governor of Jiang Province (江州, modern Jiangxi and Fujian), but put him under close watch by trusted generals, although he permitted Liu Yikang's staff members who were willing to accompany him to go to Jiang Province with him, and supplied him with many things.

== After removal as prime minister ==
However, Emperor Wen's older sister Liu Xingdi (劉興弟) the Princess Kuaiji secretly feared for Liu Yikang's life; once, when Emperor Wen was at a feast at her house, she prostrated herself and pleaded for Liu Yikang's life. Emperor Wen wept and promised to preserve his life, swearing by Chuningling (初寧陵), Emperor Wu's tomb. Emperor Wen then sealed the wine that he was drinking with Princess Xingdi and sent it to Liu Yikang to share with him. Liu Yikang's life was therefore safe for as long as Princess Xingdi was alive. However, when the official Fu Lingyu (扶令育) pleaded for Liu Yikang to be recalled to Jiankang in 441, Emperor Wen had him arrested and forced him to commit suicide. After Princess Xingdi died in 444, Liu Yikang had one fewer person to protect him.

In late 445, after a plot centered around the official Fan Ye was discovered—a plot which was allegedly designed to assassinate Emperor Wen and put Liu Yikang on the throne, even though Liu Yikang's own involvement appeared tenuous at best—Emperor Wen had Liu Yikang removed from his posts and his title, demoting him to commoner rank on 25 January 446 and put under house arrest. In 447, two more plots intending to make Liu Yikang emperor occurred, and Emperor Wen sent messengers to Liu Yikang, notifying him that he might be further moved to Guang Province (廣州, modern Guangdong and Guangxi). Liu Yikang refused the movement, stating that he would rather be dead than be exiled further, and Emperor Wen did not move him. However, in 451, in the middle of a Northern Wei invasion, Emperor Wen became apprehensive that conspirators might again try to use Liu Yikang as a focal point. At further urging by Crown Prince Shao, Liu Jun the Prince of Wuling, and He Shangzhi (何尚之), Emperor Wen sent his official Yan Long (嚴龍) to order Liu Yikang to commit suicide. Liu Yikang refused—stating that Buddhism prohibited suicide, and requesting that Yan kill him. Yan therefore suffocated him with a blanket.
