= Taizu of Jin =

Taizu of Jin may refer to the following Chinese people who received the temple name Taizu after their deaths:

- Sima Zhao (211–265), King of Jin
- Li Keyong (856–908), Taizu of Later Tang, also known as Taizu of Jin
- Wanyan Aguda (1068–1123), Taizu and founding emperor of Jin dynasty (1115–1234)
- Nurhaci (1559–1626), Taizu and founding ruler of Later Jin (1616–1636)

== See also ==
- Shi Jingtang (892–942), founding emperor of Later Jin (936–947)
- Taizu (disambiguation)
- Jin (disambiguation)
