= Xu Xianzhi =

Eastern Jin and Liu Song official (364-426)

Xu Xianzhi (徐羨之) (364 – 8 February 426), courtesy name Zongwen (宗文), was a high-level official of the Chinese Liu Song dynasty, who, along with his colleagues Fu Liang and Xie Hui, deposed Emperor Shao after the death of Emperor Wu (Liu Yu) due to their belief that Emperor Shao was not fit to be emperor. When Emperor Shao's brother Emperor Wen subsequently wanted to kill him, he committed suicide.

== During Eastern Jin Dynasty ==
During the late Eastern Jin, Xu Xianzhi served as an assistant to the official Wang Ya (王雅), and then to the general Liu Laozhi (劉牢之). Later, during the brief usurpation of the warlord Huan Xuan, he served as an assistant to Huan Xuan's cousin Huan Xiu (桓脩), where he was a colleague of Liu Yu and befriended him. When Liu Yu rose against Huan Xuan in 404, Xu Xianzhi joined his rebellion and served as an assistant to Liu Yu. When Liu Yu went on a northern campaign against Later Qin in 416, he served as the deputy of the chief official remaining at the capital Jiankang, Liu Muzhi (劉穆之). When Liu Muzhi died in 417, Liu Yu had Xu take over briefly for Liu Muzhi, although Liu Yu himself soon returned to Jiankang. Because of Xu's contributions, Liu Yu made him a general and a minister.

== During Emperor Wu's reign ==
After Liu Yu seized the Jin throne in 420 and established Liu Song, he created Xu the Duke of Nanchang and made him the governor of the capital region, Yang Province (揚州, modern Zhejiang and southern Jiangsu). He was regarded as a talented official who did not display emotions easily. The minister Zheng Xianzhi (鄭鮮之) once, while observing Xu and Fu Liang, commented, "If you hear the words that Xu and Fu spoke, you will no longer consider yourself a learned person."

When Emperor Wu grew ill in 422, he entrusted his crown prince Liu Yifu to Xu, Fu, Xie Hui, and Tan Daoji, and soon died. Liu Yifu succeeded him (as Emperor Shao), and in the mourning period, he had Xu and Fu handle important matters for him.

== During Emperor Shao's reign ==
Emperor Shao soon became known for spending much time on frivolous matters with impertinent attendants, even during the three-year mourning period, and not on studies or important matters of state. Xu, Fu, and Xie became convinced that he was not a fit emperor and considered deposing him. However, they had even lower opinions of his oldest younger brother, Liu Yizhen (劉義真) the Prince of Luling, so they first stoked the rivalry that Emperor Shao already had with Liu Yizhen and then accused Liu Yizhen of crimes. In 424, Emperor Shao reduced Liu Yizhen to commoner rank and exiled him.

Xu, Fu, and Xie then prepared to remove Emperor Shao as well. Because they were apprehensive about the powerful armies that Tan and Wang Hong had, they summoned Tan and Wang to the capital and then informed them of the plot. They then sent soldiers into the palace to arrest Emperor Shao, after first persuading the imperial guards not to resist. Before Emperor Shao could get up from bed in the morning, the soldiers were already in his bedchamber, and he made a futile attempt to resist, but was captured. He was sent back to his old palace. The officials then, in the name of Emperor Shao's mother Empress Dowager Zhang, declared Emperor Shao's faults and demoted him to Prince of Yingyang, offering the throne to his younger brother Liu Yilong the Prince of Yidu instead. (Xu's associate Cheng Daohui (程道惠) had initially urged that Xu offer the throne to an even younger brother, Liu Yigong (劉義恭) the Prince of Jiangxia, to control power longer, but Xu and Fu believed Liu Yilong to be capable and therefore decided on him.) Xu remained at Jiankang, while Fu went to Liu Yilong's post at Jing Province (荊州, modern Hubei) to welcome him.

Before Liu Yilong could accept or arrive at Jiankang, Xu and Fu sent assassins to kill both Emperor Shao and Liu Yizhen. (Fu had changed his mind after advice from the official Cai Kuo (蔡廓), but his letter to Xu to try to stop the assassinations arrived too late.) Liu Yilong, initially apprehensive of the officials' intentions in light of Emperor Shao's and Liu Yizhen's deaths, initially did not accept the throne, but after advice by Wang Hua (王華), Wang Tanshou (王曇首, Wang Hong's brother), and Dao Yanzhi (到彥之), accepted, and he advanced to Jiankang and took the throne (as Emperor Wen).

== During Emperor Wen's reign ==
Fearful that Emperor Wen would act against them, Xu and Fu, prior to Emperor Wen's arrival at Jiankang, made Xie the governor of Jing Province to replace him, with the intent that Xie and Tan can counteract against the emperor should the emperor act against them. Once Emperor Wen had ascended the throne, he kept Xu and Fu content by keeping them in their posts. In 425, Xu and Fu offered to resign, and Emperor Wen approved and began to handle important matters of state himself. However, Xu's nephew Xu Peizhi (徐佩之) and his associates Cheng and Wang Shaozhi (王韶之) persuaded him that he did not need to resign, and thereafter he re-assumed his post. (While it was not explicitly stated in history, it appeared that Fu then did so as well.)

However, Emperor Wen was resentful that Xu, Fu, and Xie had killed his two older brothers, and in late 425 planned to destroy them, particularly at the urging of Wang Hua and the general Kong Ningzi (孔寧子). He therefore mobilized troops and publicly declared that he was going to attack rival Northern Wei but was privately preparing to arrest Xu and Fu while engaging in a military campaign against Xie. In spring 426, rumors had leaked of such a plan, and so Xie began to prepare for armed resistance. Soon, Emperor Wen publicly issued an edict ordering that Xu, Fu, and Xie be arrested and killed, while issuing a separate edict summoning Xu and Fu to the palace. Xie's brother Xie Jiao (謝嚼) received news of this and quickly informed Fu, who in turned informed Xu. Xu fled out of Jiankang and then committed suicide in a kiln by slitting his throat. His two sons Xu Qiaozhi (徐乔之) and Xu Qinu (徐乞奴) were arrested and executed.
