= 390 =

390 in various calendars
- Gregorian calendar: 390; CCCXC
- Ab urbe condita: 1143
- Assyrian calendar: 5140
- Balinese saka calendar: 311–312
- Bengali calendar: −204 – −203
- Berber calendar: 1340
- Buddhist calendar: 934
- Burmese calendar: −248
- Byzantine calendar: 5898–5899
- Chinese calendar: 己丑年 (Earth Ox); 3087 or 2880 — to — 庚寅年 (Metal Tiger); 3088 or 2881
- Coptic calendar: 106–107
- Discordian calendar: 1556
- Ethiopian calendar: 382–383
- Hebrew calendar: 4150–4151
- Hindu calendars
- Vikram Samvat: 446–447
- Shaka Samvat: 311–312
- Kali Yuga: 3490–3491
- Holocene calendar: 10390
- Iranian calendar: 232 BP – 231 BP
- Islamic calendar: 239 BH – 238 BH
- Javanese calendar: 273–274
- Julian calendar: 390; CCCXC
- Korean calendar: 2723
- Minguo calendar: 1522 before ROC 民前1522年
- Nanakshahi calendar: −1078
- Seleucid era: 701/702 AG
- Thai solar calendar: 932–933
- Tibetan calendar: ས་མོ་གླང་ལོ་ (female Earth-Ox); 516 or 135 or −637 — to — ལྕགས་ཕོ་སྟག་ལོ་ (male Iron-Tiger); 517 or 136 or −636

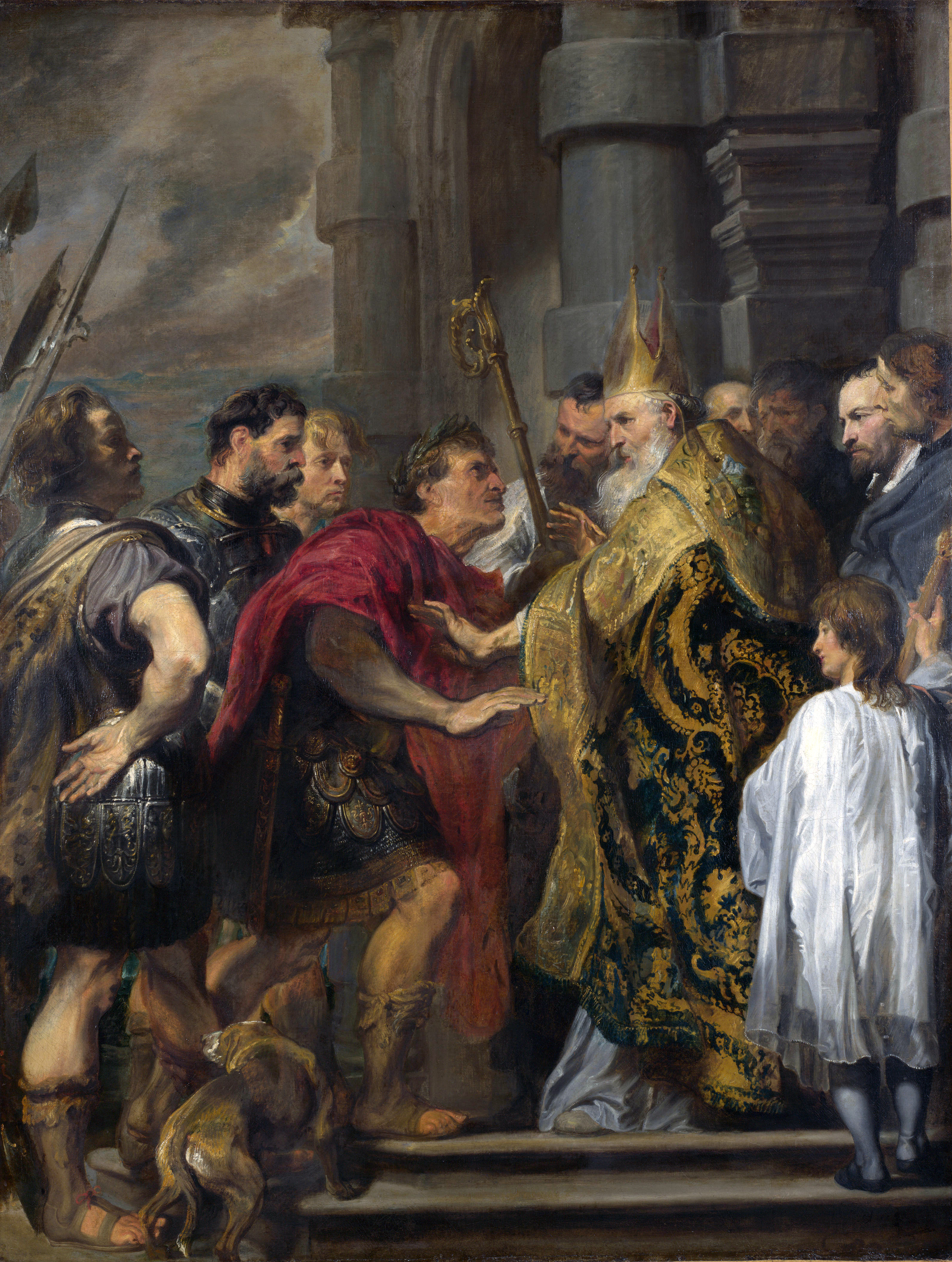
Emperor Theodosius I and Ambrose, by Anthony van Dyck

Year 390 (CCCXC) was a common year starting on Tuesday of the Julian calendar. At the time, it was known as the Year of the Consulship of Augustus and Neoterius (or, less frequently, year 1143 Ab urbe condita). The denomination 390 for this year has been used since the early medieval period, when the Anno Domini calendar era became the prevalent method in Europe for naming years.

== Events ==
=== By place ===
==== Roman Empire ====
- April – Massacre of Thessalonica: Resentment among the citizens of Thessalonica (Macedonia) breaks out into violence after the arrest of a popular charioteer. Butheric, military commander of Illyricum, is murdered. Emperor Theodosius I orders vengeance, despite the pleas for mercy by Ambrose, bishop of Milan; more than 7,000 inhabitants are massacred by the Roman army.
- Ambrose retires to Milan (residence of Theodosius I) and refuses to celebrate a mass in the emperor's presence, until he repents for ordering the massacre in Thessalonica. Theodosius, filled with remorse, kneels in humility and strips off his royal purple, before the altar of the cathedral in Milan, humbling himself before the church.
- The Visigoths and Huns, led by Alaric, invade Thrace. Stilicho, high-ranking general (magister militum) of Vandal origin, raises an army and begins a campaign against the Goths.
- Theodosius I brings an obelisk from Egypt to the Hippodrome of Constantinople.

==== India ====
- Rudrasena II of Vakataka succeeds his father, Prithivishena I. In the same year he marries Prabhavatigupta, daughter of the Gupta king Chandragupta II.

=== By topic ===
==== Art ====
- C. 390–401 – Priestess of Bacchus: Late Antiquity ivory diptych; documents the relationship of the senators Quintus Aurelius Symmachus and Virius Nicomachus Flavianus. It commemorates the marriage of the two families. The right panel is inscribed "Symmachorum", with an elaborately dressed priestess who makes an offer on an altar. It is now kept at the Victoria and Albert Museum in London.

==== Religion ====
- Jerome, having finished the Latin translation of the New Testament, begins translating the Old Testament.
- The Kama Sutra is revised by Vatsyayana.

== Births ==
- Bleda, king of the Huns (approximate date)
- Gao Yun, duke of the Xianbei state Northern Wei (d. 487)
- Prosper of Aquitaine, disciple and Christian writer (approximate date)
- Romanus of Condat, hermit and saint (approximate date)
- Simeon Stylites, Christian Stylite (approximate date)
- Tonantius Ferreolus, prefect of Gaul (approximate date)
- Xie Hui, general of the Liu Song dynasty (d. 426)

== Deaths ==
- January 25 – Gregory Nazianzus, theologian and Patriarch of Constantinople (b. 329)
- Apollinaris of Laodicea, bishop and theologian
- Aurelius Victor, Roman historian and politician
- Chen Guinü, queen consort of Jin Xiaowudi
- Diodorus of Tarsus, bishop and monastic reformer
