= Daoji =

Daoji may refer to:

- Ji Gong or Master Daoji, Song dynasty monk
- Shitao, also known as Daoji, Qing dynasty monk-painter

== See also ==
- Tan Daoji
