= Tan Daoji =

Eastern Jin and Liu Song general (died 436)

- 檀道濟
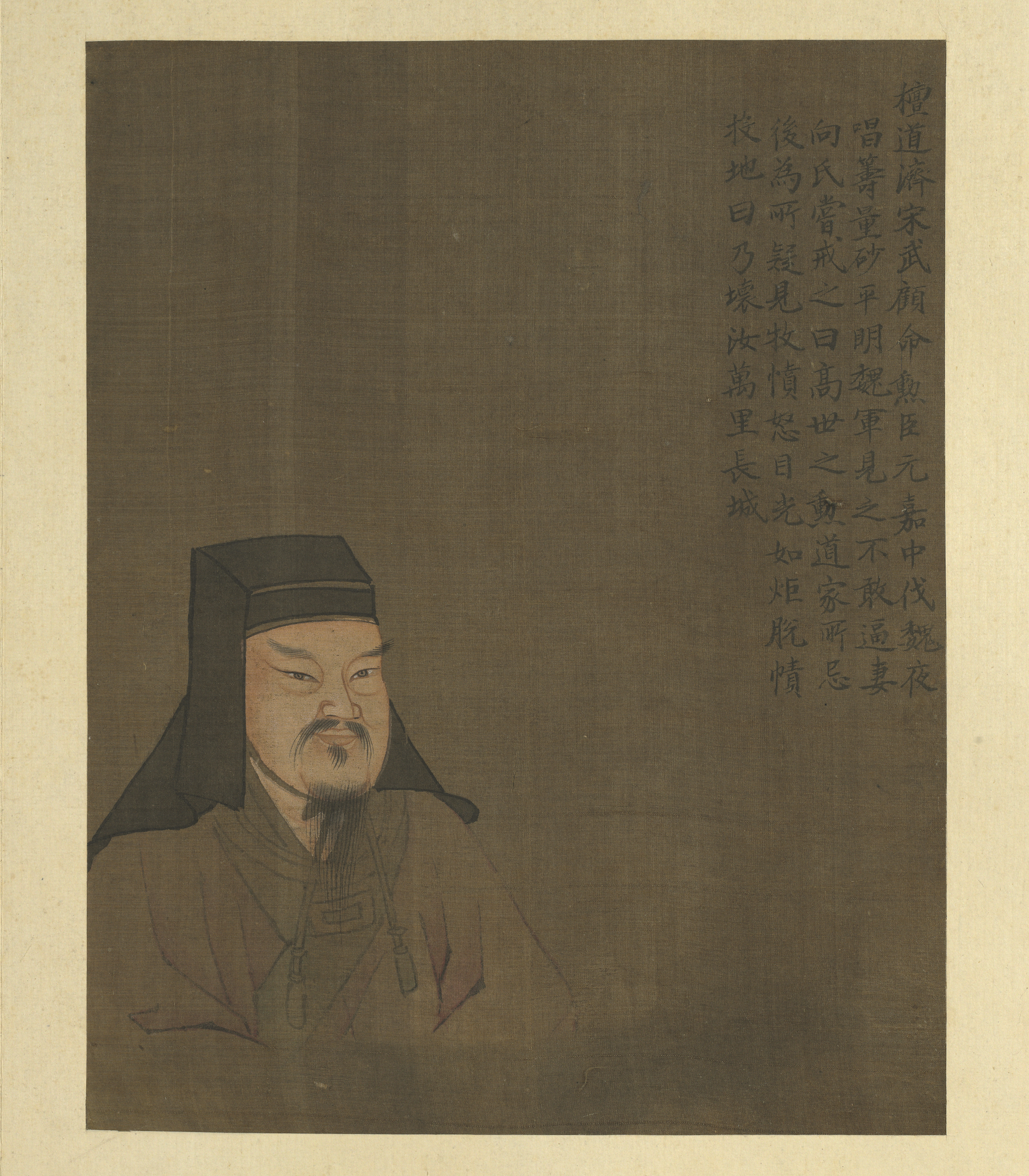
- Born: between 368 and 394; Jingkou
- Died: 436; Jiankang

Tan Daoji (simplified Chinese: 檀道济; traditional Chinese: 檀道濟; pinyin: Tán Dàojì) (before 394 - April 9, 436) was a high-level general of the Chinese Liu Song dynasty. He was one of the most respected generals during the Southern and Northern Dynasties era. Because of this, however, he was feared by Emperor Wen and even more so by Emperor Wen's brother, the prime minister Liu Yikang the Prince of Pengcheng, and during an illness of Emperor Wen, Liu Yikang had Tan arrested and executed on false accusations of treason.

== During Jin Dynasty ==
Tan family was originally from Jinxiang County, Gaoping Prefecture (in today's Shandong), and relocated to the south after the Disaster of Yongjia. It is not known when Tan Daoji was born, but what is known is that he lost his parents early, and was said to be appropriate in his deeds even as a young orphan, being respectful to his older brothers and sisters. Two of his older brothers, Tan Shao (檀韶; 366 - 421) and Tan Zhi (檀祗; 368 - 418), were also generals later.

When warlord Huan Xuan seized the Jin throne from Emperor An of Jin in 403, Liu Yu rose against him in 404, and Tan joined Liu Yu's army and served as his assistant. When Huan Xuan was killed late in 404 but his nephew Huan Zhen (桓振) continued to resist Liu's army, Tan killed Huan Zhen in battle. For this achievement, he was created the Marquess of Wuxing. He continued to participate in various campaigns, including assisting Liu Yu's brother Liu Daogui (劉道規) against invading Later Qin and Western Shu forces commanded by Gou Lin (苟林) and Huan Xuan's cousin Huan Qian (桓謙) in 410 and battling Xu Daofu (徐道覆), the brother-in-law of the warlord Lu Xun (盧循). For this, he was created the Baron of Tang. (This might seem a demotion, but Liu Yu was reorganizing noble titles at the time, and while it was technically a demotion, he gave Tan a larger fief.)

When Liu Yu launched a major attack against Later Qin in 416, Tan was his forward commander, and he made major contributions in contributing the important cities Xuchang and Luoyang. After Later Qin's capital Chang'an fell in 417, he became the general in charge of protecting Liu Yu's heir apparent Liu Yifu.

== During Emperor Wu's reign ==
After Liu Yu seized the throne from Emperor Gong of Jin in 420, ending Jin and establishing Liu Song (as Emperor Wu), he created Tan the Duke of Yongxiu. When Emperor Wu grew ill in 422, he entrusted Liu yifo to Xu Xianzhi, Fu Liang, Xie Hui and Tan, and he died soon after. Liu Yifu succeeded him as Emperor Shao.

== During Emperor Shao's reign ==
Unlike Xu, Fu, and Xie, however, Tan did not remain at the capital Jiankang or involve himself with the operations of the imperial government, but became the governor of Southern Yan Province (南兗州, modern central Jiangsu). When rival Northern Wei launched a major attack on Liu Song later in 422 in light of Emperor Wu's death, seeking to capture the Liu Song provinces just south of the Yellow River, Tan Daoji commanded an army to try to save those provinces. He was able to save Qing Province (青州, modern central and eastern Shandong), but could not also save Si (司州, central Henan) and Yan (兗州, modern western Shandong) provinces.

In 424, Xu, Fu, and Xie, dissatisfied with Emperor Shao's tendencies to trust people lacking virtues and believing him to be unfit to be emperor, resolved to depose him. Because they were apprehensive about the powerful armies that Tan and Wang Hong had, they summoned Tan and Wang to the capital and then informed them of the plot. They then sent soldiers into the palace to arrest Emperor Shao, after first persuading the imperial guards not to resist. Before Emperor Shao could get up from bed in the morning, the soldiers were already in his bedchamber, and he made a futile attempt to resist, but was captured. He was sent back to his old palace. The officials then, in the name of Emperor Shao's mother Empress Dowager Zhang, declared Emperor Shao's faults and demoted him to Prince of Yingyang, offering the throne to his younger brother Liu Yilong the Prince of Yidu instead. Liu Yilong, after some hesitation, took the throne as Emperor Wen.

== During Emperor Wen's reign ==
Emperor Wen tried to pacify the officials who made him emperor by giving them greater titles and fiefs, and he tried to create Tan the Duke of Wuling (a commandery, as opposed to the county that he was the duke of), but Tan insisted on refusing, and returned to his post at Guangling (廣陵, in modern Yangzhou, Jiangsu).

Emperor Wen, angry that Xu, Fu, and Xie had, immediately after they deposed Emperor Shao, assassinated both Emperor Shao and another brother of his, Liu Yizhen (劉義真) the Prince of Luling, had Xu and Fu arrested and killed in 426, and declared Xie, then the governor of Jing Province (荊州, modern Hubei) a renegade. Believing that neither Tan nor Wang Hong was involved in the plot to depose and kill Emperor Shao, he summoned them to the capital, and he put Tan in charge of the army to attack Xie. Xie, while a talented strategist, was unaccustomed to commanding large armies, and Tan defeated him; he was subsequently captured and executed. In light of his victory, Emperor Wen promoted Tan to greater titles and made him the governor of Jiang Province (江州, modern Jiangxi and Fujian).

When Emperor Wen launched a major campaign against Northern Wei in 430 to try to regain provinces south of the Yellow River, Tan was not in command of the army—Dao Yanzhi (到彥之) was. Dao was initially able to recover the provinces, as Northern Wei chose to abandon them temporarily, waiting for winter to counterattack. When it did so in winter 430, Dao retreated after Luoyang and Hulao fell, leaving Huatai (滑台, in modern Anyang, Henan) and its commanding general Zhu Xiuzhi (朱脩之) under Northern Wei siege and totally without support. Emperor Wen replaced Dao with Tan in spring 431, requesting that he try to advance to Huatai to save it. Tan was initially successful in his attempts to advance toward Huatai, winning several battles against Northern Wei forces. However, after he reached Licheng (歷城, in modern Jinan, Shandong), his supply route was cut off by the Northern Wei general Yizhan Jian, and he was no longer able to reach Huatai. Huatai soon fell, Zhu was captured, and Tan retreated. On the way, Northern Wei forces became aware that Tan was out of food, and so trailed him, ready to attack. Tan then used a trick that made him famous in Chinese history—at night, he had the soldiers pretend that sand was grain and yell out the measurements, and then covered the sand with grain. In the morning, when Northern Wei forces saw the pile of sand covered with grain, they mistakenly thought that Tan's forces did not lack food at all, and therefore decided not to pursue him further. Tan was able to withdraw his forces without major losses. Emperor Wen gave him greater titles and returned him to Jiang Province.

However, because of Tan's abilities and because his sons and subordinates were also all capable, he eventually became suspected by Emperor Wen and his brother, the prime minister Liu Yikang, particularly because Emperor Wen was ill for several years. Liu Yikang, who presumed that he would be regent if Emperor Wen were to die, was particularly concerned that he would be unable to control Tan. In late 435, when Emperor Wen became very ill, Liu Yikang summoned Tan to Jiankang, and despite misgivings by Tan's wife, Tan went to Jiankang anyway. He remained about a month, and as Emperor Wen grew better, he considered ordering Tan to return to Jiang Province or to put him in charge of another army against Northern Wei, but then suddenly grew sicker. At that time, Tan was already on the dock ready to depart for Jiang Province, and Liu Yikang summoned him back to Jiankang and arrested him. Emperor Wen then issued an edict falsely accusing Tan of preparing treason and executed him with his sons, but spared his grandsons. Emperor Wen also killed two of Tan's trusted generals, Xue Tong (薛彤) and Gao Jinzhi (高進之), who were capable soldiers and compared by their admirers to Guan Yu and Zhang Fei.

When Tan was arrested, he angrily threw his scarf on the ground and stated bitterly, "You have destroyed your Great Wall." When Northern Wei officials heard of Tan's death, they celebrated. In 450, when Northern Wei made a major incursion into Liu Song and destroyed six provinces, Emperor Wen lamented that if Tan were still alive, he would have prevented Northern Wei advances.

Tan was said to have had 36 military strategies—although it was later semi-derogatorily noted by the Southern Qi general Wang Jingze (王敬則), that of Tan's best strategies, "Retreat" was the last and best strategy—because the people had satirized Tan's retreat from Northern Wei forces after Huatai's fall.
