= Song Shao Di =

The term Song Shao Di (宋少帝) may refer to:

- Emperor Shao of Song (406–424) of the Liu Song dynasty
- Zhao Bing (Emperor Bing of Song, 1272–1279) of the Song dynasty
