= Liu Yu's Northern Expeditions =

Successful campaigns during the Jin dynasty

- Part of Eastern Jin and Sixteen Kingdoms period
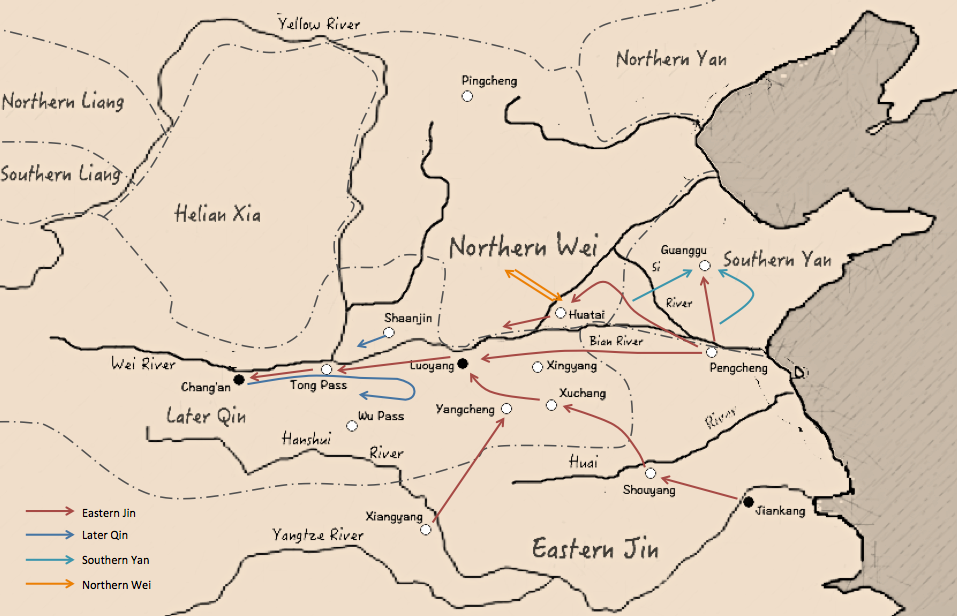
- Map of Liu Yu's Northern Expeditions
Date	409–416
Location	Northern China
Result	Jin victory; All territory south of the Yellow River except for Chang'an recovered

Belligerents
Eastern Jin dynasty	Later Qin dynasty Southern Yan dynasty Hu Xia dynasty Northern Wei dynasty

Commanders and leaders
Liu Yu	Various

Strength
c. 100,000–200,000	Northern Wei: c. 100,000, others unknown but probably similar.

Casualties and losses
Light	Heavy

Liu Yu's Northern Expeditions (simplified Chinese: 刘裕北伐; traditional Chinese: 劉裕北伐; pinyin: Liú Yù Běi Fá) were a series of successful campaigns mounted by the Eastern Jin dynasty from 409 AD to 416 AD against the Southern Yan, Later Qin, Northern Wei and Hu Xia dynasties that successfully recovered all of Eastern Jin's territory south of the Yellow River with the exception of the Chang'an area, which was taken by Hu Xia. These victories were the basis of the prosperity of the Reign of Yuanjia.

== Background ==
Following the Eastern Jin's victory at the Battle of Fei River, North China divided into several dynastic states ruled by non-Han peoples. After Liu Yu, one of the most excellent generals of the time, came to power in the Eastern Jin, Liu Yu saw the opportunity to recover the former territories held by the Western Jin dynasty. He also sought to use these expeditions to expand his prestige and be given the nine bestowments, a step he must take before he could usurp the Jin throne.

== Expeditions ==
=== First against Southern Yan ===
Liu Yu's first expedition was against Southern Yan in 409 CE. The Eastern Jin army attacked from Jiankang to Xiapei, and then to Longchen. Along the roads, Eastern Jin's forces built fortresses to prevent Southern Yan forces from cutting off their supplies. They engaged Southern Yan forces at the Battle of Linqu, winning decisively. By May, Eastern Jin forces reached the Southern Yan capital at Guanggu. When he reached the area, Liu Yu saw that the ground was covered with grain and he said to his men that: "The Southern Yan ruler is already in my hand", as there would be no supply problems. In February 410 CE, Eastern Jin forces captured Guanggu and put an end to Southern Yan.

=== Second against Later Qin ===
In 416 CE, Liu Yu launched a major attack against Later Qin. Early in the campaign, he captured the important cities of Xuchang and Luoyang, the latter being the former capital of the Western Jin dynasty. After a symbolic victory in Luoyang, Liu Yu began preparing himself to claim the nine bestowments. He was offered the nine bestowments and the title of Duke of Song, but initially rejected them as a gesture of humility. He then sent two armies into Shaanxi to engage the remnants of Later Qin's forces.

Later Qin asked for assistance from Northern Wei, as the Northern Wei emperor was the Later Qin emperor Yao Hong's brother-in-law. Northern Wei therefore sent 100,000 men to guard the northern bank of the Yellow River, but wary about making themselves a target, did not provide direct relief. Northern Wei forces at the northern bank harassed the Eastern Jin forces, but Eastern Jin forces defeated Northern Wei forces using crossbows to launch spears through the Northern Wei forces, and in fright, the force quickly dispersed, suffering heavy casualties. Following this victory, Eastern Jin forces continued on Later Qin and captured its capital Chang'an, destroying it. (Northern Wei later sent pursuit troops to surround Liu Yu should he be unable to take Chang'an, but they withdrew these forces when Liu Yu captured Chang'an.)

=== Loss of Chang'an region ===
Following this victory, it seemed that the Eastern Jin would quickly destroy Hu Xia, Northern Wei and the remaining non-Han states, reunifying China proper. Western Qin's prince Qifu Chipan, Northern Liang's prince Juqu Mengxun and Western Liang's prince Li Gao were all sufficiently intimidated by the success that they nominally submitted to Jin authority, while Northern Wei made peace with Eastern Jin. However Liu Yu returned to Jiankang due to the death of Liu Muzhi, Liu Yu's aide who he had entrusted to keep the imperial court in check while he was away. Liu Yu left his 10-year-old son, Liu Yizhen, to guard the Guanzhong region with supervision from the likes of Wang Xiu and Wang Zhen'e. Hu Xia forces took advantage of Liu Yu's absence to capture Guanzhong in 418. During the defence, the Jin generals were involved in violent infighting. As a result, Xia conquered Guanzhong while many of Liu Yu's key generals like Wang Zhen'e and Zhu Lingshi were killed. Nevertheless, the Eastern Jin still held most of the territories south of the Yellow River.

== Aftermath ==
These victories laid the foundation for the Reign of Yuanjia, a period of relative prosperity brought about by diminished threats of invasion or constant warfare.

== Sources ==
- Book of Song.
