= Emperor Taizu of Zhou =

Emperor Taizu of Zhou may refer to:

- Guo Wei (904–954), who in 951 founded a dynasty called Zhou (known in history as Later Zhou)
- Wu Sangui (1612–1678), who in 1678 founded a rebel dynasty called Zhou

== See also ==
- Taizu (disambiguation)
- Zhou (disambiguation)
