= Gaozu =

Gaozu (Chinese: 高祖; pinyin: Gāozǔ; Wade–Giles: Kao^{1}-tsu^{3}; lit. 'high forefather') is an imperial temple name typically used for Chinese emperors who founded a particular dynasty. It may refer to:

== Emperors generally referred to as Gaozu ==
- Emperor Gaozu of Han (256 BC or 247 BC – 195 BC)
- Emperor Gaozu of Tang (566–635)

== Emperors whose temple name was Gaozu ==
- Cao Pi (187–226) of Cao Wei, the temple name was eventually changed to Shizu
- Liu Yuan (Han-Zhao) (251–310), the temple name was eventually changed to Taizu
- Shi Le (274–333) of Later Zhao
- Fu Jian (317–355) of Former Qin
- Qifu Gangui (died in 412) of Western Qin
- Yao Xing (366–416) of Later Qin
- Liu Yu (Emperor Wu of Liu Song) (363–422)
- Yuan Hong (Emperor Xiaowen of Northern Wei) (467–499)
- Emperor Wu of Liang (464–549)
- Emperor Wu of Chen (503–559)
- Emperor Wu of Northern Zhou (543–578)
- Yang Jian (Emperor Wen of Sui) (541–604) of the Sui dynasty
- Wang Jian (Former Shu) (847–918) of Former Shu
- Yang Longyan (897–920) of Wu (Ten Kingdoms)
- Meng Zhixiang (874–934) of Later Shu
- Liu Yan (emperor) (889–942) of Southern Han
- Shi Jingtang (892–942) of the Later Jin (Five Dynasties)
- Liu Zhiyuan (895–948) of the Later Han (Five Dynasties)
- Chen Youliang (1320–1363) of Great Han

== Others ==
It may also refer to those who never officially declared themselves as emperors, but were posthumously given the title by their imperial descendants:

- Sima Yi (179–251)
- Zhang Shi (Former Liang) (died in 320), Emperor Gaozu of Former Liang (320–376)
- Murong Hui (269–333), Emperor Gaozu of Former Yan (337–370)
- Gao Huan (496–547), Emperor Taizu of Northern Qi (550–577)

== See also ==
- Kao Tsu (disambiguation)
- Taizu (disambiguation) (similar meaning; some emperors have been called both)
- Taizong (disambiguation)
- Shizu (disambiguation)
