= Thái Tông =

- Vietnamese alphabet: Thái Tông
- Chữ Hán: 太宗
- Literal meaning: Grand Ancestor

Thái Tông is the temple name used for several emperors of Vietnam. The term was derived from the Chinese equivalent Tàizōng.

It may refer to:

- Lý Thái Tông (1000–1054, reigned 1028–1054), emperor of the Lý dynasty
- Trần Thái Tông (1218–1277, reigned 1226–1258), emperor of the Trần dynasty
- Lê Thái Tông (1423–1442, reigned 1433–1442), emperor of the Lê dynasty
- Mạc Thái Tông (died 1540, reigned 1529–1540), emperor of the Mạc dynasty

== See also ==
- Taizong (disambiguation), Chinese equivalent
- Taejong (1367–1422), Korean equivalent
