= Kao Tsu =

Kao Tsu may refer to:

- Kao Tsu of Han China (256 BCE or 247 BCE – 195 BCE), founder and first emperor of the Han dynasty of China, Emperor (202 BCE – 195 BCE)
- Kao Tsu or Gaozu of Northern Wei, a temple name assumed by Emperor Xiaowen of Northern Wei (467-499) as part of a deliberate program of sinification.
- Kao Tsu of Tang China (566–635), founder and first emperor of the Tang dynasty of China, Emperor (618–626)

== See also ==
- Gaozu (disambiguation)
