= Daizong =

- Chinese: 代宗
- Literal meaning: Generational Ancestor
Transcriptions
Standard Mandarin
- Hanyu Pinyin: Dàizōng
- Wade–Giles: Tai^{4}-tsung^{1}

Daizong is the temple name used for several emperors of China. It may refer to:

- Emperor Daizong of Tang (727–779, reigned 762–779), emperor of the Tang dynasty
- Jingtai Emperor (1428–1457, reigned 1449–1457), emperor of the Ming dynasty

== See also ==
- Dai Zong, a fictional Song dynasty hero from the Chinese novel Water Margin
- Taizong (disambiguation)
