= Xie Hui =

Eastern Jin and Liu Song general (390-426)

Xie Hui (謝晦) (390–426), courtesy name Xuanming (宣明), was a high-level general of the Chinese Liu Song dynasty, who, along with his colleagues Xu Xianzhi and Fu Liang, deposed Emperor Shao after the death of Emperor Wu (Liu Yu) due to their belief that Emperor Shao was not fit to be emperor. When Emperor Shao's brother Emperor Wen subsequently killed Xu and Fu, Xie started a rebellion, but was defeated and killed.

== During Jin Dynasty ==
Xie Hui was born in Yangxia County, Henan. When he was young, he served on the staff of the official Meng Chang (孟昶). When Meng committed suicide in 410 over disagreements he had with Liu Yu over how to counter the attack that the warlord Lu Xun was making on the capital Jiankang, Liu Yu asked his chief assistant Liu Muzhi whom among Meng's staff he can retain. Liu Muzhi recommended Xie, and Liu Yu added Xie to his staff. He subsequently contributed to Liu Yu's campaign against Sima Xiuzhi (司馬休之) in 415, and therefore became increasingly important as a strategist for Liu Yu. However, because his opinion often differed from Liu Muzhi's, Liu Muzhi opposed promoting him, and Liu Yu did not promote him further until Liu Muzhi's death in 417. Despite this, the general Tan Daoji later remarked that of the ten strategies that Liu Yu used to conquer Later Qin in 416 and 417, nine came from Xie.

== During Emperor Wu's reign ==
After Liu Yu seized the Jin throne in 420 and established Liu Song, he created Xie the Duke of Wuchang and made him a high-level official. In 421, Xie was temporarily removed from his post over erroneous drafting of an edict creating a title for Wang Qiu (王球) instead of Wang Hua (王華), but soon was restored to his post.

At one point, Xie saw that Liu Yu's crown prince Liu Yifu was surrounding himself with people without virtues, and he warned Emperor Wu about this. Emperor Wu therefore considered replacing Liu Yifu with his younger brother Liu Yizhen (劉義真) the Prince of Luling, and had Xie visit Liu Yizhen to evaluate him. However, Xie had an even lower opinion of Liu Yizhen, and Emperor Wu kept Liu Yifu as crown prince.

When Emperor Wu grew ill in 422, he entrusted Liu Yifu to Xu Xianzhi, Fu Liang, Xie, and Tan, although he remarked to Liu Yifu:

Although Tan Daoji is capable and full of strategy, he lacks ambitions, unlike his brother Tan Shao (檀韶), whom I found difficult to reign in. Xu Xianzhi and Fu Liang should not present any problems. Xie Hui followed me on campaigns many times, and he changes easily depending on the situation. If there is a problem, it will originate from him.

He soon died, and Liu Yifu succeeded him (as Emperor Shao).

== During Emperor Shao's reign ==
During Emperor Shao's mourning period, he had Xu and Fu handle important matters of state for him, while entrusting military matters to Xie. However, he soon became known for spending much time on frivolous matters with impertinent attendants, even during the three-year mourning period, and not on studies or important matters of state. Xu, Fu, and Xie became convinced that he was not a fit emperor and considered deposing him. However, they had even lower opinions of Liu Yizhen, his oldest younger brother, so they first stoke the rivalry that Emperor Shao already had with Liu Yizhen and then accused Liu Yizhen of crimes. In 424, Emperor Shao reduced Liu Yizhen to commoner rank and exiled him.

Xu, Fu, and Xie then prepared to remove Emperor Shao as well. Because they were apprehensive about the powerful armies that Tan and Wang Hong had, they summoned Tan and Wang to the capital and then informed them of the plot. They then sent soldiers into the palace to arrest Emperor Shao, after first persuading the imperial guards not to resist. Before Emperor Shao could get up from bed in the morning, the soldiers were already in his bedchamber, and he made a futile attempt to resist, but was captured. He was sent back to his old palace. The officials then, in the name of Emperor Shao's mother Empress Dowager Zhang, declared Emperor Shao's faults and demoted him to Prince of Yingyang, offering the throne to his younger brother Liu Yilong the Prince of Yidu instead. Xu and Fu subsequently assassinated both Emperor Shao and Liu Yizhen, and it is unclear whether Xie participated in this decision. In order to counteract imperial authority, prior to Liu Yilong's arrival, made Xie the governor of Jing Province (荊州, modern Hubei) to replace Liu Yilong, with the intent that Xie and Tan can counteract against the emperor should the emperor act against them. Liu Yilong subsequently, after some deliberation, accepted the throne (as Emperor Wen).

== During Emperor Wen's reign ==
Xie tried to befriend Emperor Wen's trusted associate Dao Yanzhi (到彥之), to try to ensure his own safety, and initially, Dao accepted Xie's offer of friendship. Xie therefore felt secure. However, Emperor Wen was resentful that Xu, Fu, and Xie had killed his two older brothers, and in late 425 planned to destroy them, particularly at the urging of Wang Hua and the general Kong Ningzi (孔寧子). He therefore mobilized troops and publicly declared that he was going to attack rival Northern Wei, but was privately preparing to arrest Xu and Fu while engaging in a military campaign against Xie. In spring 426, rumors had leaked of such a plan, and so Xie began to prepare for armed resistance. Soon, Emperor Wen publicly issued an edict ordering that Xu, Fu, and Xie be arrested and killed, while issuing a separate edict summoning Xu and Fu to the palace. Xie's brother Xie Jiao (謝嚼) received news of this and quickly informed Fu, who in turned informed Xu. Xu committed suicide, while Fu was arrested and executed. Emperor Wen also executed Xie Hui's heir apparent Xie Shixiu (謝世休), who happened to be in Jiankang because Xie Hui's two daughters were marrying Emperor Wen's brother Liu Yikang the Prince of Pengcheng and cousin Liu Yibin (劉義賓) the Marquess of Xinye, and arrested Xie Jiao.

Emperor Wen, believing that Tan Daoji was not initially involved in the plot to depose and kill Emperor Shao and Liu Yizhen, summoned Tan to the capital and put him in command of the army against Xie Hui. He also summoned Wang Hong and made him the prime minister. Meanwhile, Xie Hui publicly mourned Xu and Fu and declared that all they did was for the empire, blaming Wang Hong, Wang Hong's brother Wang Tanshou (王曇首, a close associate of Emperor Wen), and Wang Hua for falsely accusing them, and demanding their execution.

Xie Hui had a powerful army, but while he thought that several other provincial governors would join him, they refused. He was initially able to defeat Dao's army, but soon Tan arrived, and Xie, fearful of Tan, did not know what to do. Tan quickly attacked him and defeated his fleet, and Xie fled back to Jiangling (江陵, in modern Jingzhou, Hubei), the capital of Jing Province, and then fled with his brother Xie Dun (謝遯), but Xie Dun was so overweight that he could not ride a horse, and so they slowed down and were captured. He was then delivered to Jiankang and executed with Xie Jiao and Xie Dun, along with all of his nephews and major associates, although many of his associates were spared. His wife and other female members of his household were seized as servants, although they were pardoned several months later.

== Bibliography ==
- Xiong, Victor Cunrui (2017). Historical Dictionary of Medieval China (2nd ed.). Lanham, Maryland; New York City; London: Rowman & Littlefield.
