= Taizong =

- Chinese: 太宗
- Literal meaning: Grand Ancestor
Transcriptions
Standard Mandarin
- Hanyu Pinyin: Tàizōng
- Wade–Giles: T'ai^{4}-tsung^{1}

Taizong was the temple name of several monarchs of China. It primarily refers to Emperor Taizong of Tang (599–649, reigned 626–649), a Tang dynasty emperor. It may also refer to:

- Tai Jia (fl. 16th-century BC), king of the Shang dynasty
- Liu Heng (202 BC–157 BC, reigned 180 BC–157 BC), also known as Emperor Wen, Han dynasty emperor
- Shi Koumi (石寇覓; fl. 295), Shi Hu's father, posthumously honored as Taizong of Later Zhao
- Li Xiong (274–334, reigned 304–334), also known as Emperor Wu, emperor of Cheng-Han
- Zhang Mao (277–324, reigned 320–324), ruler of Former Liang
- Sima Yu (320–372, reigned in 372), also known as Emperor Jianwen, emperor of the Jin dynasty (266–420)
- Fu Deng (343–394, reigned 386–394), also known as Emperor Gao, Former Qin emperor
- Tuoba Si (392–423, reigned 409–423), also known as Emperor Mingyuan, Northern Wei emperor
- Liu Yu (439–472, reigned 465–472), also known as Emperor Ming, emperor of Liu Song
- Xiao Gang (503–551, reigned 549–551), also known as Emperor Jianwen, Liang dynasty emperor
- Yelü Deguang (902–947, reigned 926–947), emperor of Khitan (renamed Liao dynasty during his reign)
- Wang Yanjun (died 935, reigned 927–935), also known as Emperor Huizong, Min dynasty emperor
- Duan Siliang (died 951, reigned 945–951), emperor of the Dali Kingdom
- Zhao Guangyi (939–997, reigned 976–997), Song dynasty emperor
- Li Deming (981–1032, reigned 1004–1032), leader of Tangut people, later posthumously honored as emperor of Western Xia
- Wanyan Sheng (1075–1135, reigned 1123–1135), emperor of the Jin dynasty (1115–1234)
- Ögedei Khan (died 1241, reigned 1229–1241), Yuan dynasty emperor
- Zhu Di (1360–1424, reigned 1402–1424), also known as Yongle Emperor and Emperor Chengzu, Ming dynasty emperor
- Taisun Khan (1416–1452, reigned 1433–1452), khagan of the Northern Yuan
- Hong Taiji (1592–1643, reigned 1626–1643), originally khan of Later Jin, later became emperor of Qing dynasty

== See also ==
- Taejong (1367–1422), Korean equivalent
- Thái Tông (disambiguation), Vietnamese equivalent
- Taizu (disambiguation)
- Daizong (disambiguation)
