= Taejo =

Taejo (Hangul: 태조, Hanja: 太祖), meaning "great ancestor", is a temple name often given to the founders of Korean dynasties, derived from the Chinese equivalent Tàizǔ. The term may refer to:

- Taejo of Goguryeo (47–165), born Go Gung, sixth monarch of Goguryeo
- Taejo of Goryeo (877–943), born Wang Geon, founder of Goryeo
- Taejo of Joseon (1335–1408), born Yi Seong-gye, founder of Joseon
- Taejo Togokhan, a character in the Speed Racer film adaptation

== See also ==
- Taizu (disambiguation) (Chinese version)
