= Taizu =

Taizu (Chinese: 太祖; pinyin: Tàizǔ; Wade–Giles: T'ai^{4}-tsu^{3}; lit. 'grand progenitor') is a temple name typically, but not always, used for Chinese monarchs who founded a particular dynasty. It may refer to:

- Emperor Gaozu of Han (256 BC or 247 BC – 195 BC)
- Sun Quan (182–252) of Eastern Wu
- Liu Yuan (Han-Zhao) (251–310) of Han-Zhao
- Tuoba Yulü (died in 321) of State of Dai
- Murong Huang (297–348) of Former Yan
- Shi Hu (295–349) of Later Zhao
- Yao Chang (331–394) of Later Qin
- Lü Guang (337–400) of Later Liang (Sixteen Kingdoms)
- Emperor Daowu of Northern Wei (371–409)
- Li Gao (351–417) of Western Liang (Sixteen Kingdoms)
- Qifu Chipan (died in 428) of Western Qin
- Feng Ba (died in 430) of Northern Yan
- Juqu Mengxun (368–433) of Northern Liang
- Emperor Wen of Liu Song (407–453)
- Emperor Gao of Southern Qi (427–482) of Southern Qi
- Zhu Wen (852–912) of Later Liang (Five Dynasties)
- Wang Shenzhi (862–925) of Min (Ten Kingdoms)
- Abaoji (872–926) of the Liao dynasty
- Qian Liu (852–932) of Wuyue
- Duan Siping (893–944) of the Dali Kingdom
- Guo Wei (904–954) of Later Zhou
- Emperor Taizu of Song (927–976)
- Emperor Taizu of Jin (1068–1123)
- Hongwu Emperor (1328–1398) of the Ming dynasty
- Ming Yuzhen (1331–1366) of Great Xia
- Wu Sangui (1612–1678) of Great Zhou

It may also refer to those who never officially declared themselves as emperors, but were posthumously given the title by their imperial descendants:

- Cao Cao (155–220), Emperor Taizu of Cao Wei (220–265)
- Sima Zhao (211–265), King of Jin
- Zhang Gui (255–314), Emperor Taizu of Former Liang (320–376)
- Fu Hong (284–350), Emperor Taizu of Former Qin (351–394)
- Huan Wen (312–373), Emperor Taizu of Huan Chu (403–404)
- Liu Weichen (died in 391), Emperor Taizu of Hu Xia (407–431)
- Xiao Shunzhi (fl. 477–482), Emperor Taizu of the Liang dynasty (502–557)
- Gao Huan (496–547), Emperor Taizu of Northern Qi (550–577)
- Yuwen Tai (507–556), Emperor Taizu of Northern Zhou (557–581)
- Chen Wenzhan (died before 557), Emperor Taizu of the Chen dynasty (557–589)
- Yang Zhong (507–568), Emperor Taizu of the Sui dynasty (581–618)
- Li Hu (died in 551), Emperor Taizu of the Tang dynasty (618–907)
- Wu Shiyue (559–635), Emperor Taizu of Wu Zhou (690–705)
- Yang Xingmi (852–905), Emperor Taizu of Wu (Ten Kingdoms) (907–937)
- Liu Anren (died before 917), Emperor Taizu of Southern Han (917–971)
- Li Keyong (856–908), Emperor Taizu of Later Tang (923–936)
- Meng Yi (Tang dynasty) (died before 934), Emperor Taizu of Later Shu (934–965)
- Xu Wen (862–927), Emperor Taizu of Southern Tang (937–975)
- Li Jiqian (963–1004), Emperor Taizu of Western Xia (1038–1227)
- Genghis Khan (1162?–1227), Emperor Taizu of the Yuan dynasty (1271–1368)
- Nurhaci (1559–1626), Emperor Taizu of the Qing dynasty (1644–1912)

== See also ==
- Taejo (disambiguation) (Korean equivalent)
- Thái Tổ (disambiguation) (Vietnamese equivalent)
- Gaozu (disambiguation) (similar meaning; some emperors have been called both)
- Shizu (disambiguation)
- Taizong (disambiguation)
