= Emperor Wu of Song =

Emperor of Liu Song from 420 to 422

Emperor Wu of Song 宋武帝
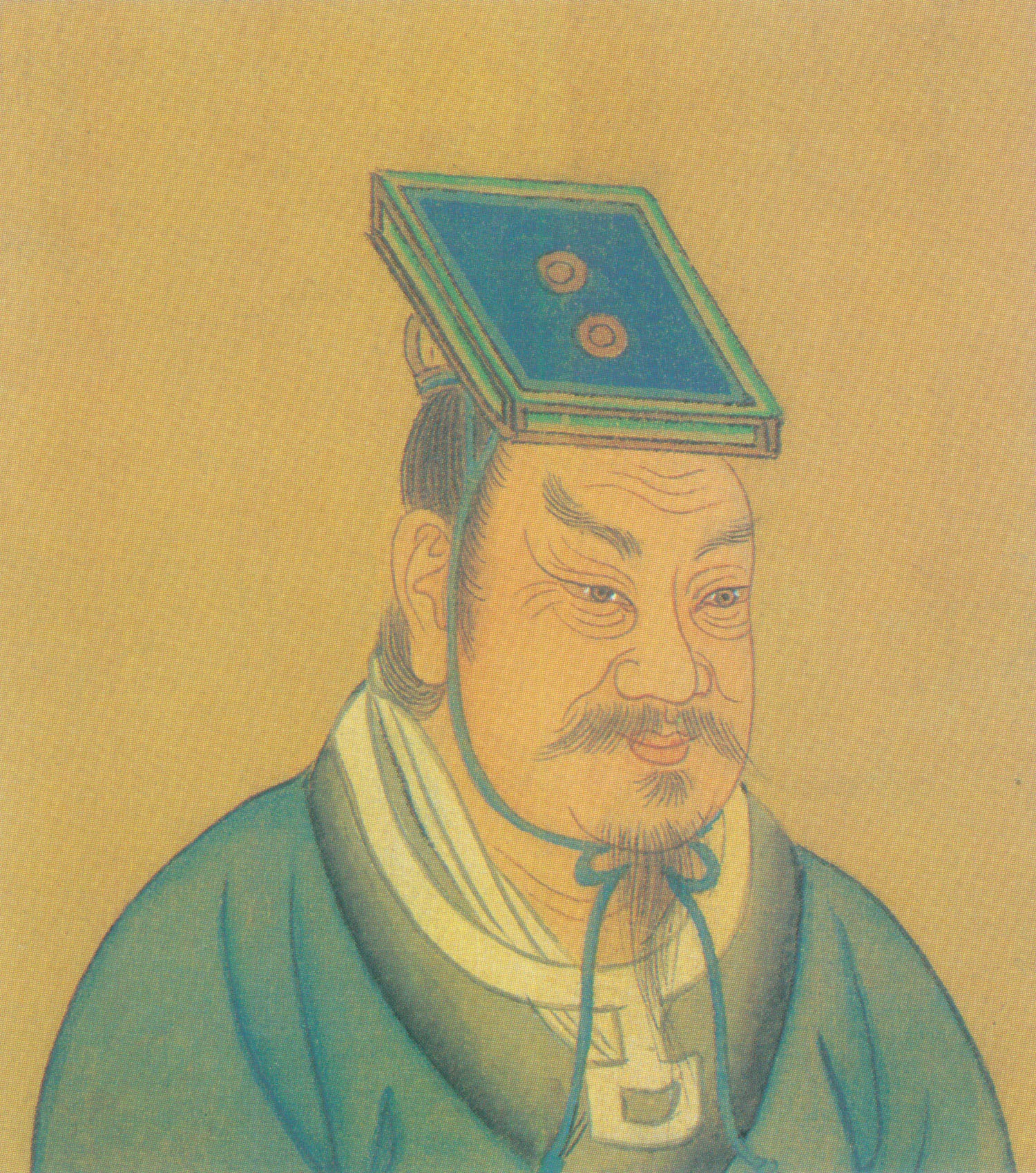

Emperor of Liu Song
- Reign: 10 July 420 – 26 June 422
- Successor: Liu Yifu
- Born: Liu Qinu (劉奇奴); 16 April 363; Jingkou, Eastern Jin
- Died: 26 June 422 (aged 59); Jiankang, Liu Song
- Burial: Chuning Mausoleum (初寧陵)
- Consorts: Empress Wujing; Empress Dowager Zhang; Grand Empress Dowager Zhang
Names
- Family name: Liú (劉); Given name: Yù (裕) courtesy name: Dexing (德興) childhood name: Qinu (奇奴), later Jinu (寄奴)
Era name and dates
- Yǒngchū (永初): 420–422
Posthumous name
- Emperor Wu (武皇帝)
Temple name
- Gaozu (高祖)
- Father: Liu Qiao
- Mother: Zhao Anzong

Emperor Wu of (Liu) Song ((劉)宋武帝; 16 April 363– 26 June 422), personal name Liu Yu (劉裕), courtesy name Deyu (德興), childhood name Jinu (寄奴), was the founding emperor of the Liu Song dynasty of China. He came from a humble background, but became prominent after leading a rebellion in 404 to overthrow Huan Xuan, who had usurped the Eastern Jin throne in January that year. After that point, using a mixture of political and military skills, Liu Yu gradually concentrated power in his own hands while expanding Jin's territory. In 420, he forced Emperor Gong of Jin to yield the throne to him, thus ending the Eastern Jin dynasty and establishing the Liu Song dynasty. He ruled only briefly, for two years, before dying and passing the throne to his son, Emperor Shao of Song. An outstanding commander, perhaps the greatest of his era, he conquered two of the Sixteen Kingdoms and remained undefeated throughout his military career. The History of the Southern Dynasties described Liu Yu as seven chi and six cun tall (approximately 1.862 m (6 ft 1.3 in).)

== Early life ==
Liu Yu was born in 363, to his father Liu Qiao (劉翹) and mother Zhao Anzong (趙安宗), while they were living at Jingkou (京口, in modern Zhenjiang, Jiangsu). His great-grandfather Liu Hun (劉混) was originally from Pengcheng (彭城, in modern Xuzhou, Jiangsu), before moving to Jingkou. Liu Qiao was said to be a descendant of the Western Han politician Liu Xiang's brother Liu Anmin, through Liu Anmin, Liu Yu was a 20th generation descendant of Han dynasty's Prince of Chu, Liu Jiao (劉交), a younger brother of Han's founder Emperor Gaozu of Han. Liu Qiao was a police officer, while Zhao Anzong was the daughter of a commandery governor. They had married in 360, and lived in fair poverty. Lady Zhao died immediately after giving birth to Liu Yu, and Liu Qiao, unable to take care of the child financially or otherwise, considered abandoning the child. Upon hearing this, Liu Yu's aunt, who had given birth to his cousin Liu Huaijing (劉懷敬) less than a year ago, went to Liu Qiao's house and took Liu Yu, weaning Liu Huaijing and giving her milk to Liu Yu instead. At some point, Liu Qiao remarried, and his new wife Xiao Wenshou bore him two sons, Liu Daolian (劉道憐) and Liu Daogui (劉道規). Liu Yu was said to be respectful to his stepmother and treated her as his own mother.

It is not known when Liu Qiao died, but in any case, Liu Yu grew up with great ambitions and was said to be strong and brave, but he was poor and uneducated, knowing only a few characters. He maintained himself by selling straw sandals, and he liked gambling. The people in his village all looked down on him. At some point, he became an officer under the general Sun Wuzhong (孫無終).

When the magician Sun En rebelled against Jin rule in 399, Liu Yu joined the army of the general Liu Laozhi (劉牢之), and he became friends with Liu Laozhi's son Liu Jingxuan (劉敬宣). On one occasion, he led some tens of soldiers on a scouting mission, when they suddenly encountered several thousand of Sun's soldiers. All of Liu Yu's soldiers were killed, and Liu Yu fell onto a riverbank, but he stood his position there and killed all of Sun's soldiers who dared to approach. Liu Jingxuan, meanwhile, realizing that Liu Yu had been away from camp for too long, went to try to find him, and saw him alone chasing and dispersing thousands of Sun's soldiers. He greatly praised Liu Yu.

Both because of his bravery and his friendship with Liu Jingxuan, Liu Yu rose through the ranks of Liu Laozhi's army. Liu Laozhi, at the time, was a powerful warlord who controlled modern Jiangsu and Zhejiang except for the region around the capital Jiankang. In 401, with Sun En, who had fled to Zhoushan Island in late 399, trying to launch a comeback and attacking Haiyan (海鹽, in modern Jiaxing, Zhejiang), Liu Yu fought him, winning several victories over him despite being outnumbered. However, eventually Sun En was able to regroup and head toward Jiankang, which he could not capture and was forced to withdraw from. He regrouped on a sea island. By imperial edict (probably at Liu Laozhi's wishes), Liu Yu was made the governor of Xiapei Commandery (下邳, roughly modern eastern Xuzhou, Jiangsu), and he was ordered to attack Sun En on his island. This allowed Liu Yu to win victories over Sun En. Sun En began to grow weaker and headed south on the coast, with Liu Yu following. In winter 401, Liu Yu defeated Sun En again at Haiyan, forcing Sun to flee far from the coast.

In 402, as the regent Sima Yuanxian and the warlord Huan Xuan prepared for battle, Sima Yuanxian believed that he had Liu Laozhi's support, and Liu Laozhi postured in support of Sima Yuanxian by bringing his forces to Jiankang. However, when Liu Yu requested to engage Huan Xuan, Liu Laozhi refused to give permission. Huan Xuan then sent messengers to try to persuade Liu Laozhi to switch sides, despite the oppositions of his nephew He Wuji (何無忌) and Liu Jingxuan, as well as Liu Yu. Without support from Liu Laozhi, Sima Yuanxian's forces collapsed in response to Huan Xuan's attack, and Sima Yuanxian and his father Sima Daozi were killed by Huan Xuan. Huan Xuan, who did not trust Liu Laozhi, immediately stripped Liu Laozhi of his military command, and Liu Laozhi, upon receiving the order, considered resisting it. He requested Liu Yu's opinion, and Liu Yu found the idea foolish, left Liu Laozhi's army, and returned to Jingkou as a civilian; He Wuji joined him as well. With the rest of the army not willing to go with his plan either, Liu Laozhi committed suicide, and Liu Jingxuan fled to Later Qin and then to Southern Yan.

By summer 402, however, Liu Yu was again in the army, and by 403 he carried a general's rank, when Sun En's nephew Lu Xun, who had succeeded him after his death in battle in 401, attacked Dongyang (東陽, in modern Jinhua, Zhejiang), and Liu Yu repelled Lu's attack. He then counterattacked and won several battles over Lu, forcing Lu to head south on the sea. At this time, He Wuji tried to persuade him to declare a rebellion at Shanyin (山陰, in modern Shaoxing, Zhejiang) against Huan Xuan, but at the advice of Kong Jing (孔靖), he declined at this time, waiting for Huan Xuan to seize the throne so that he would have a reason. When Huan Xuan's cousin Huan Qian (桓謙) asked Liu Yu's opinion about whether Huan Xuan should receive the throne, Liu Yu pretended to be a Huan clan loyalist and encouraged Huan Xuan to receive the throne. In winter 403, Huan Xuan forced Emperor An of Jin to yield the throne to him, establishing the new state of Chu. Liu Yu initially continued to feign loyalty, and Huan Xuan, believing in him and his talents, considered giving him greater authorities, despite counsel from his wife Empress Liu that Liu Yu could not be trusted and should be executed.

== Campaign against Huan Xuan ==
Meanwhile, Liu Yu and He Wuji, now at Jingkou, continued their planning to rebel against Huan Xuan now that Huan Xuan had seized the throne. They were soon joined in their plans by Liu Yi (劉毅) and Meng Chang (孟昶), and soon a number of other disaffected individuals joined their plan, with Liu Yu as the leader. Their plan was to simultaneously start several uprisings:

- Liu Yi, Liu Yu's brother Liu Daogui, and Meng would surprise and kill Huan Xuan's cousin Huan Hong (桓弘), then the governor of Qing Province (青州, then with its headquarters at Guangling (廣陵, in modern Yangzhou, Jiangsu)), and seize Guangling.
- Zhuge Zhangmin (諸葛長民) would surprise and kill Diao Kui (刁逵), the governor of Yu Province (豫州, then modern central Anhui) and seize Liyang (歷陽, in modern Chaohu, Anhui).
- Wang Yuande (王元德), Xin Huxing (辛扈興), and Dong Houzhi (董厚之) would rise in Jiankang and attack Huan Xuan directly.
- Liu Yu, He Wuji, and the other conspirators would surprise and kill Huan Xuan's cousin Huan Xiu (桓脩) the Prince of Ancheng, then the governor of Xu (徐州) and Yan (兗州) Provinces, then with their headquarters at Jingkou, and seize Jingkou.

The conspirators put their plans into action. Liu Yu and He Wuji were able to surprise Huan Xiu and seize Jingkou, and Liu Yu then persuaded the capable administrator and writer Liu Muzhi to join him as his propaganda specialist and assistant. Liu Yi, Liu Daogui, and Meng Chang persuaded Huan Hong to go on a hunt, and as Huan Hong opened the city gates to let his hunters out, they surprised him and killed him. However, Zhuge Zhangmin's plans were leaked, as were those of the conspirators at Jiankang. All were arrested, and the conspirators at Jiankang were executed. (Zhuge Zhangmin was subsequently rescued before he could be executed.)

Liu Yu quickly headed for Jiankang, and Huan Xuan, hesitant to engage him directly, waited at Jiankang, trying to see if he could wear Liu Yu down, although, at Huan Qian's insistence, he sent a detachment to try to stop Liu Yu. However, Liu Yu quickly defeated Huan Xuan's generals Wu Fuzhi (吳甫之) and Huangfu Fu (皇甫敷) and arrived at Jiankang. He then defeated Huan Qian, and Huan Xuan, in panic, fled west, intending to go back to his power base at Jiangling (江陵, in modern Jingzhou, Hubei). Liu Yu entered Jiankang and declared the reestablishment of Jin, even though at this time Emperor An and his brother Sima Dewen were both still in Huan Xuan's control. Liu Yu entrusted most administrative matters to Liu Muzhi while dealing severe punishment to corrupt officials and those who had supported Huan Xuan, and quickly the government was cleaned up. (The only Huan Xuan supporter who was spared was Huan Xuan's prime minister Wang Mi (王謐), who, when Liu Yu was poor, had helped him and paid off his gambling debts, and therefore Liu Yu not only spared but entrusted him with high posts.) Liu Yu, however, prepared for the contingency that Emperor An would not be recovered by making Sima Zun (司馬遵) the Prince of Wuling (a grandson of Emperor An's great-grandfather Emperor Yuan) acting emperor.

Liu Yu sent Liu Yi, He Wuji, and Liu Daogui west to attack Huan Xuan. They quickly defeated Huan Xuan's general He Danzhi (何澹之) and took Jiang Province (江州, modern Jiangxi and Fujian), and then continued to head toward Jiangling. They encountered Huan Xuan's much larger force at Chenghong Island (崢嶸洲), in modern Ezhou, Hubei), and despite the numerical disadvantage, they crushed Huan Xuan's forces. Huan Xuan fled back to Jiangling with Emperor An, while Huan Xuan's brother-in-law Yin Zhongwen (殷仲文) turned against him and took Emperor An's wife Empress Wang Shen'ai and Emperor Mu's wife Empress Dowager He to Jiankang.

Once Huan Xuan arrived back in Jiangling, he tried to prepare to flee to his distant relative, Huan Xi (桓希) the governor of Liang Province (梁州, modern southern Shaanxi and northwestern Hubei). His forces collapsed, however, refusing to follow his orders. At the inducement of his subordinate Mao Xiuzhi (毛脩之), whose uncle Mao Qu (毛璩) was the governor of Yi Province (modern Sichuan and Chongqing), he decided to try to flee to Yi Province instead, but on the way, he was intercepted by Mao Qu's subordinates Mao Youzhi (毛佑之) and Fei Tian (費恬), who attacked him, and the officer Feng Qian (馮遷) beheaded him. The officials Wang Tengzhi (王騰之) and Wang Kangchan (王康產) then declared Emperor An's restoration at Jiangling.

However, with Liu Yi's forces still on the way to Jiangling, Huan Qian and Huan Xuan's nephew Huan Zhen (桓振) made a surprise attack on Jiangling, capturing it and seizing Emperor An and Sima Dewen. Huan Zhen and Huan Qian did not try to redeclare Chu; rather, they tried to hold Emperor An as collateral while trying to maintain their status as Jin officials. They initially defeated He Wuji's forces, but by 405, with the other members of the Huan clan (including Huan Xi and Huan Wei (桓蔚) the governor Yong Province (雍州, then southwestern Henan and northwestern Hubei) defeated, Jiangling fell to Liu Yi, and Huan Qian and Huan Zhen fled. He Wuji escorted Emperor An back to Jiankang, and Liu Yu effectively became regent, even though the government was at this point still a coalition of near equals.

== As regent ==
=== Early years ===
Liu Yu, although he had ambitions to be emperor, learned from Huan Xuan's failures that he could not act too quickly, but must establish his authority through further victories first, particularly because he led a coalition of generals and officials with different agendas in his victory over Huan. He therefore proceeded cautiously, initially sharing power with He Wuji and Liu Yi, among others. For the next few years, he also made several offers to resign his posts, judging correctly that the imperial officials would not dare to accept them, to further establish the image that he was indispensable.

In spring 405, Mao Qu's soldiers, unhappy that Mao sent them on long-distance campaigns initially against Huan Xuan and then against Huan Zhen, rebelled, supporting the military officer Qiao Zong as their leader. They defeated and killed Mao and captured Chengdu (成都, in modern Chengdu, Sichuan), and Qiao Zong established his independent Western Shu state there.

Also in 405, Lu Xun, who had in 404 marched south and captured Panyu (番禺, in modern Guangzhou, Guangdong) during the wars relating to Huan Xuan, offered peace to the imperial government by paying a tribute. Liu Yu, believing that he had no abilities to defeat Lu by this point, made Lu the governor of Guang Province (廣州, modern Guangdong and Guangxi) and Lu's brother-in-law and lieutenant Xu Daofu (徐道覆) the governor of Shixing Principality (始興, roughly modern Shaoguan, Guangdong).

In 407, Liu Yu commissioned his friend Liu Jingxuan to launch a major attack on Qiao Zong's Western Shu, but in 408, Liu Jingxuan's forces became stalled against the Western Shu general Qiao Daofu (譙道福) and was forced to retreat when food supplies ran out.

=== Campaigns against Southern Yan and Lu Xun ===
In 409, the Southern Yan emperor Murong Chao began a campaign of attacking and pillaging the Jin northern borders, intending to capture men and women to be trained as musicians. In response, Liu Yu decided to launch a campaign to destroy Southern Yan, over the objections of most imperial officials, but was supported by Meng Chang. While Liu Yu was quickly able to defeat Southern Yan's main forces at the Battle of Linqu in late 409 and put the Southern Yan capital Guanggu (廣固, in modern Qingzhou, Shandong) under siege, Guanggu did not fall quickly. While Liu Yu was besieging Guanggu, Xu Daofu persuaded a reluctant Lu Xun (who was afraid of a confrontation with Liu Yu) to attack north, reasoning that eventually when Liu Yu was ready, Liu Yu would attack first, and that with Liu Yu besieging Guanggu, they could capture the rest of the empire together.

In spring 410, Liu Yu captured Guanggu, ending Southern Yan, and considered further readying a campaign against Later Qin, but was informed that Lu and Xu were attacking north, and therefore quickly returned south towards Jiankang. Meanwhile, He Wuji led a fleet against Xu at Yuzhang (豫章, in modern Nanchang, Jiangxi), but was defeated and killed by Xu. A second force commanded by Liu Yi was also defeated by Xu and Lu. However, Liu Yi's captured soldiers informed Lu that Liu Yu was on his way back to Jiankang, and Lu, intimidated, considered ending his campaign, but continued to Jiankang at Xu's insistence. A number of imperial officials, including Meng, suggested that Emperor An be taken across the Yangtze River to evade Lu's forces, but Liu Yu refused, choosing to defend Jiankang.

Once at Jiankang, Lu refused several strategies that Xu offered that were risky but offered chances of success, instead trying to intimidate Liu Yu's forces into collapsing, which he could not do. Soon he ran out of food supplies and withdrew to Xunyang (尋陽, in modern Jiujiang, Jiangxi). Liu Yu gave chase, but also ordered his generals Sun Chu (孫處) and Shen Tianzi (沈田子) to take a fleet by sea to attack Panyu, fully confident that he can defeat Lu and make it impossible for Lu to then retreat to his home base. Meanwhile, Xu attacked Jing Province (荊州, modern Hubei and Hunan), but was defeated by Liu Daogui, and rejoined Lu, preparing for a confrontation with Liu Yu. Around the new year 411, they engaged Liu Yu at Dalei (大雷, in modern Anqing, Anhui), but Liu Yu destroyed their fleet with fire. Lu and Xu fled toward Panyu, which had however been captured by Sun at this point. Lu put Panyu under siege, but Shen, who was then trying to capture other commanderies, returned to Panyu and defeated Lu along with Sun. Lu fled toward Jiao Province (交州, modern northern Vietnam) where he was defeated by the governor, Du Huidu (杜慧度). Lu then killed his wife and concubines and committed suicide by jumping into a river.

=== Campaigns against Western Shu and Later Qin ===
With the state having been stabilized after Lu Xun's destruction, Liu Yu again turned his attention outward, hoping to use military victories to propel himself into sufficiently high public standing that he can take the throne for himself. At the same time, however, he began to remove members of his coalition who stood or might stand in his way. In 412, believing that Liu Yi, then governor of Jing Province, was about to act against him along with Liu Yi's cousin Liu Fan (劉藩) the governor of Yan Province, he arrested Liu Fan and his friend Xie Hun (謝混), and then made a surprise attack against Liu Yi, defeating Liu Yi's forces easily. Liu Yi was killed in flight. In 413, Liu Yu also surprised and killed Zhuge Zhangmin, whom he suspected of considering to act against him when he was away from Jiankang attacking Liu Yi.

Meanwhile, in late 412, Liu Yu commissioned the general Zhu Lingshi to attack Qiao Zong's Western Shu, secretly instructing him to take the long route to Qiao Zong's capital Chengdu by Min River (岷江), rather than the short route by Fu River (涪江). Zhu's forces were able to surprise Qiao Zong's main general Qiao Daofu and Qiao Zong himself, capturing Chengdu in 413 and annexing Western Shu back into Jin.

In 414, Liu Yu began to suspect Liu Yi's replacement as the governor of Jing Province, Sima Xiuzhi (司馬休之), who was a member of the imperial clan and whose son Sima Wensi (司馬文思) had been created the Prince of Qiao and had gathered many adventurers around him. In spring 414, Liu Yu had Sima Wensi's confederates arrested and executed, while delivering Sima Wensi to Sima Xiuzhi, intending for Sima Xiuzhi to show submission by executing Sima Wensi himself. Instead, Sima Xiuzhi only requested that Sima Wensi's princely title be stripped. In spring 415, Liu Yu arrested another son of Sima Xiuzhi, Sima Wenbao (司馬文寶), and Sima Xiuzhi's nephew Sima Wenzu (司馬文祖), ordering the two to commit suicide, and then launched an attack on Sima Xiuzhi, who was joined by Lu Zongzhi (魯宗之) the governor of Yong Province. Initially, Sima Xiuzhi and Lu Zongzhi enjoyed some successes, defeating Liu Yu's son-in-law Xu Kuizhi (徐逵之), but after Liu Yu himself arrived, he defeated Sima Xiuzhi's forces, capturing Jiangling and forcing Sima Xiuzhi and Lu Zongzhi to flee to Later Qin. Liu Yu now no longer had significant opposition in Jin.

In 416, Liu Yu launched a major attack against Later Qin, in light of the recent death of the Later Qin emperor Yao Xing, entrusting the capital to his assistant Liu Muzhi, with his teenage heir apparent Liu Yifu being nominally in charge. In winter 416, the important city Luoyang fell to Liu Yu's general Tan Daoji (檀道濟). In light of Luoyang's fall, Liu Yu had Emperor An create him Duke of Song and bestow him the nine bestowments, showing his intentions to take the throne eventually, although he declined both honors at that point.

In spring 417, Tan Daoji and another general, Shen Linzi, engaged in a major campaign with Later Qin's most prominent general, Yao Shao (姚紹) the Duke of Lu, the uncle of the emperor Yao Hong. After a month of battles, Yao Shao was defeated, and he died in anger. With Yao Shao dead, the other Later Qin generals could not resist Jin forces. Liu Yu's fleet, commanded by Wang Zhen'e (Wang Meng's grandson), advanced quickly, while Yao Hong tried to first destroy Liu Yu's flank forces, commanded by Shen Linzi's brother Shen Tianzi. Despite Yao Hong's large advantage in numbers, Shen Tianzi crushed him, forcing him to flee back to his capital Chang'an. Wang Zhen'e's fleet then arrived and defeated Later Qin's final resistance, entering Chang'an. Yao Hong surrendered, and Liu Yu had him delivered to Jiankang and executed, ending Later Qin.

=== Steps toward usurpation ===
With Later Qin destroyed, there was an expectation that Liu Yu would next advance northwest and either destroy or force the subjugation of the several states in the northwest still -- Xia, Western Qin, Northern Liang, and Western Liang. Indeed, at this point, Western Qin's prince Qifu Chipan, Northern Liang's prince Juqu Mengxun, and Western Liang's prince Li Gao were all sufficiently intimidated that they nominally submitted to Jin's authority. However, Liu Muzhi then died at this time, and Liu Yu, intending on taking the throne, decided to return to Jiankang himself, leaving his 11-year-old son Liu Yizhen (劉義真) and the generals Wang Zhen'e, Shen Tianzi, Mao Dezu (毛德祖), and the official Wang Xiu (王脩) in charge of Chang'an.

With Liu Yu having left Chang'an, Xia's emperor Helian Bobo was intent on taking Chang'an himself. He had his sons Helian Gui (赫連璝) and Helian Chang, along with his general Wang Maide (王買德), make a three-pronged advance toward Chang'an while cutting off the supply route between Luoyang and Chang'an. Meanwhile, with Wang Zhen'e and Shen Tianzi being previously envious of each other, Shen Tianzi suspected Wang Zhen'e of being ready to rebel, and so killed him. Wang Xiu then executed Shen Tianzi, but then Liu Yizhen believed the accusations that Wang Zhen'e was in fact about to rebel and that Wang Xiu was ready to as well, and so executed Wang Xiu. Once Wang Xiu was executed, Liu Yizhen himself was without supervision, and he, in fear of Xia forces, withdrew all of his forces inside Chang'an, and Xia forces then besieged the city. Liu Yu, hearing this, sent Zhu Lingshi to replace Liu Yizhen and ordered Liu Yizhen to withdraw. Liu Yizhen's forces, however, having pillaged Chang'an, could not withdraw quickly, and they were crushed by Xia forces at Qingni (青泥, in modern Xi'an, Shaanxi), with nearly the entire army killed or captured. Liu Yizhen barely escaped with his life, and the Chang'an region became Xia possession, although Jin retained the Luoyang region. Liu Yu, initially not knowing whether Liu Yizhen had survived, prepare a campaign to attack Xia, but once he heard of Liu Yizhen's survival, he stopped those plans. He continued to bestow great power (even if at times nominal) in his brother Liu Daolian and in his sons, in order to try to further affirm his authority.

Meanwhile, Liu Yu, having accepted the title Duke of Song and the nine bestowments in summer 418, had Emperor An create him the Prince of Song, but then publicly declined the title. Meanwhile, he became convinced of the truth of a prophecy that stated, "There will be two more emperors after Changming." (Changming, which meant "dawn," was the courtesy name of Emperor An's father Emperor Xiaowu.) He therefore became resolved to kill Emperor An, and he tried several times to have Emperor An's servants poison him, but because Emperor An's brother Sima Dewen continuously attended to him, the servants had no chance to poison him. However, around the new year 419, Sima Dewen was himself ill and had to be at his house. Liu Yu's assassin Wang Shaozhi (王韶之) then took the opportunity to kill Emperor An—according to Zizhi Tongjian, by twisting clothes into a rope and then using it to strangle Emperor An. Liu Yu then made Sima Dewen emperor (as Emperor Gong).

Emperor Gong's reign was brief and powerless. In fall 419, Liu Yu accepted the title Prince of Song. In spring 420, Liu Yu, then at Shouyang (壽陽, in modern Lu'an, Anhui) sent his assistant Fu Liang to Jiankang to pressure Emperor Gong to yield the throne. Emperor Gong responded by summoning Liu Yu back to the capital in summer 419, and Fu then offered him a draft of an abdication edict, requesting that he write it personally. Sima Dewen did so, and then left the palace and went to his old house while he was Prince of Langya. Three days later, Liu Yu took the throne and established Liu Song (as Emperor Wu), ending Jin.

== Reign ==
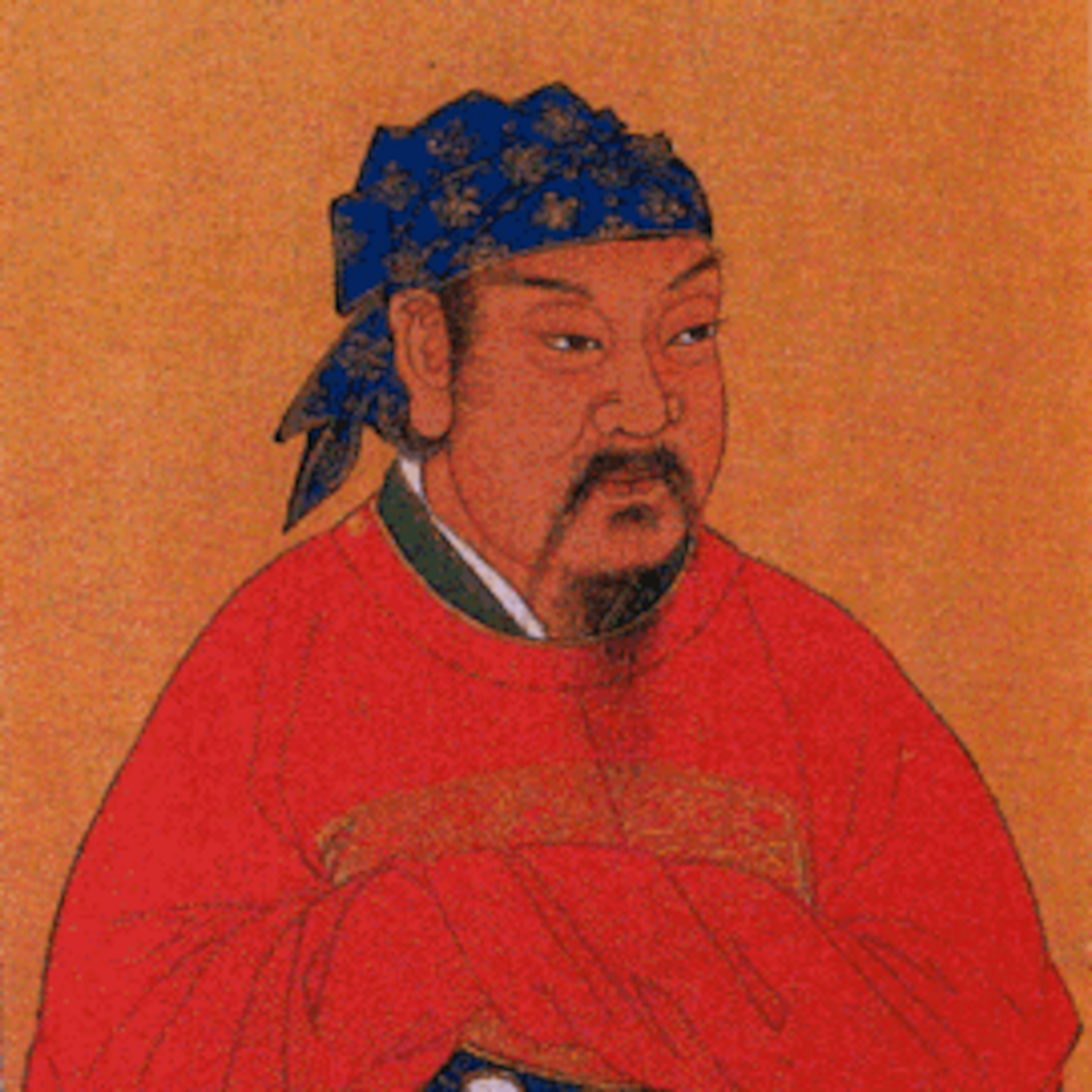
Liu Yu, Emperor Wu.

Emperor Wu created the former Jin emperor the Prince of Lingling. He honored his stepmother Princess Dowager Xiao as empress dowager. He created his brother Liu Daolian, his sons, and his nephews princes. In fall 420, he posthumously honored his wife Zang Aiqin (臧愛親), who had died in 408, empress, and created his oldest son Liu Yifu crown prince. Also, having seen how much damage bad reputation can do to people first hand, he ordered that those who had been labeled undesirables by public opinion be allowed new chances to show their worth.

Soon, Emperor Wu, still believing Sima Dewen to be a threat, sent Sima Dewen's former attendant Zhang Wei (張偉) a bottle of poisoned wine, ordering him to poison Sima Dewen. Zhang, not wanting to carry out the order, drank the wine himself and died. Meanwhile, however, in order to prevent any likelihood that Sima Dewen would have a male heir, Liu Yu ordered brothers of Sima Dewen's wife Princess Chu, Chu Xiuzhi (褚秀之) and Chu Danzhi (褚淡之), to poison any male children that Princess Chu or Sima Dewen's concubines would bear. Sima Dewen himself feared death greatly, and he and Princess Chu remained in the same house, cooking their own meals, with Princess Chu paying for the material herself. Assassins that Emperor Wu sent initially could find no chance to kill the former emperor. In fall 421, Emperor Wu sent Chu Danzhi and his brother Chu Shudu (褚叔度) to visit their sister. As Princess Chu came out to meet her brothers in a different house, soldiers that Liu Yu sent intruded into Sima Dewen's house and ordered Sima Dewen to take poison. He refused, stating that Buddhism prohibited suicide and that those who committed suicide could not receive human bodies in their next rebirths. The assassins therefore used a blanket to cover his head and asphyxiated him.

In 422, having been warned by his official Xie Hui that Crown Prince Yifu was often spending his time with people lacking in wisdom, Emperor Wu considered making Liu Yizhen the Prince of Luling crown prince instead. Xie, however, after meeting with Liu Yizhen, had an even worse opinion of Liu Yizhen, and so Emperor Wu stopped considering so.

In summer 422, Emperor Wu became extremely ill, and he entrusted Crown Prince Yifu to Xu Xianzhi, Fu Liang, Xie Hui, and Tan Daoji. He then died, and Liu Yifu took the throne as Emperor Shao.

== Mausoleum ==
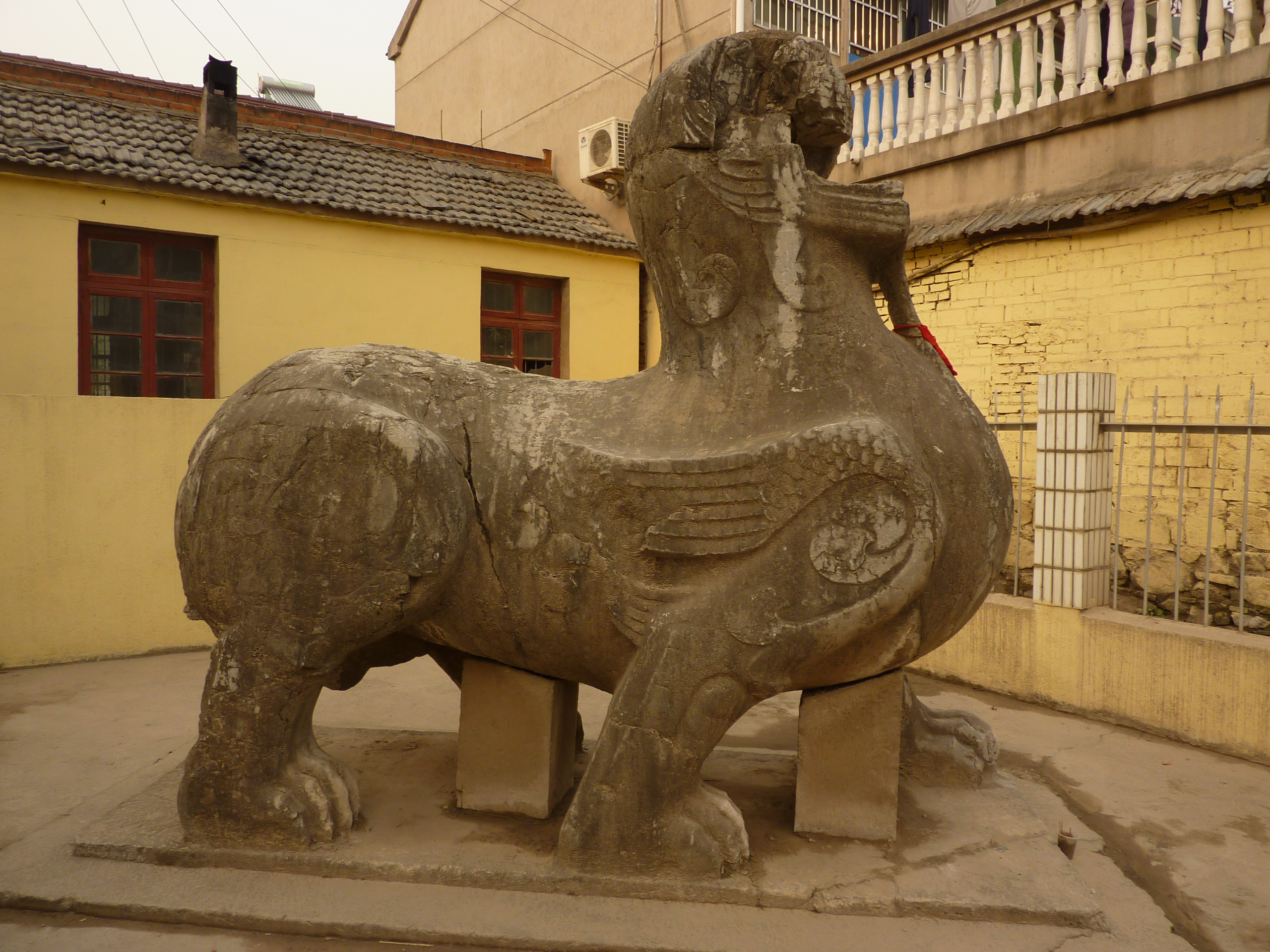
The western qilin of the Chuning Mausoleum

Liu Yu was buried in the Chuning Mausoleum (初寧陵, Chuning Ling), which is located in what is Jiangning District, in the eastern suburbs of the present-day Nanjing. The only surviving statues of his spirit way are two qilin, facing each other across the street in the appropriately named Qilinpu Cun ("Qiling Place Village") of the Qilin Town.

== Legacy ==
Liu Yu is mostly remembered as one of greatest generals of the Northern and Southern dynasties. Under him, the Southern Chinese empire came the closest to reconquering the North. Although the territory which he won in the Northwest was quickly lost, his campaigns allowed the Southern dynasties the advantage of defending along the Yellow River, and preserved an independent Southern Chinese state long enough for the Xianbei states in the North to be assimilated.

== Family ==
- Empress Wujing, of the Zang clan of Dongguan (武敬皇后 東莞臧氏; 360–408), personal name Aiqin (愛親)
  - Princess Xuan of Kuaiji (會稽宣公主; 383–444), personal name Xingdi (興弟), first daughter
    - Married Xu Kuizhi of Donghai (東海 徐逵之; d. 415), and had issue (two sons)
- Empress Dowager, of the Zhang clan (皇太后 張氏; d. 426), personal name Que (闕)
  - Liu Yifu, Prince Yingyang (營陽王 劉義符; 406–424), first son
  - Princess Yixinggong (義興恭公主), personal name Huiyuan (惠媛)
- Grand Empress Dowager Zhang, of the Hu clan (章皇太后 胡氏; 368–409), personal name Dao'an (道安)
  - Liu Yilong, Emperor Wen (文皇帝 劉義隆; 407–453), third son
- Xiuyi, of the Fu clan (修儀 符氏)
  - Princess Guangde (廣德公主), third daughter
- Xiuhua, of the Sun clan (修華 孫氏)
  - Liu Yizhen, Prince Xiaoxian of Luling (廬陵孝獻王 劉義真; 407–424), second son
- Xiurong, of the Wang clan (修容 王氏; d. 432)
  - Liu Yikang, Prince of Pengcheng (彭城王 劉義康; 409–451), fourth son
- Meiren, of the Yuan clan (美人 袁氏)
  - Liu Yigong, Prince Wenxian of Jiangxia (江夏文獻王 劉義恭; 413–465), fifth son
- Meiren, of the Sun clan (美人 孫氏)
  - Liu Yixuan, Prince of Nan (南王 劉義宣; 415–454), sixth son
- Meiren, of the Lü clan (美人 呂氏)
  - Liu Yiji, Prince Wen of Hengyang (衡陽文王 劉義季; 415–447), seventh son
- Unknown
  - Princess Zhao of Wuxing (吳興昭公主), personal name Rongnan (榮男), second daughter
    - Married Wang Yan of Langya (琊瑯 王偃; 403–456), and had issue (four sons, two daughters including Empress Wenmu)
  - Princess Xuancheng (宣城公主)
    - Married Zhou Jiao (週嶠)
  - Princess Xin'an (新安公主)
    - Married Wang Jingshen (王景深)
  - Princess Wuxuan (吳宣公主)
    - Married Chu Zhanzhi (褚湛之), and had issue (one son)
  - Princess Fuyang (富陽公主)
    - Married Xu Qiaozhi (徐喬之)
  - Princess Ai of Shi'an (始安哀公主)
    - Married Chu Zhanzhi (褚湛之)
  - Princess Kang of Yuzhang (豫章康公主; 410–464), personal name Xinnan (欣男)
    - Married Xu Qiaozhi (徐喬之)
    - Married He Yu of Lujiang (廬江 何瑀; d. 449), and had issue (one son, one daughter)

Chinese royalty
New dynasty	Emperor of Liu Song; 420–422	Succeeded by Emperor Shao of Liu Song
Preceded by Emperor Gong of Jin	Emperor of China (Southern); 420–422	Succeeded by Emperor Shao of Liu Song
