= Emperor Shao of Song =

Emperor Shao of Song 宋少帝

Emperor of Liu Song
- Reign: 26 June 422 – 7 July 424
- Predecessor: Emperor Wu
- Successor: Emperor Wen
- Born: Liu Chebing (劉車兵) c. 406
- Died: 4 August 424 (aged 17–18)
- Consorts: Sima Maoying of Henei
Names
- Family name: Liú (劉); Given name: Yìfú (義符) childhood name: Chebing (車兵)
Era name and dates
- Jǐngpíng (景平): 423–424
Posthumous name
- None
- Father: Emperor Wu
- Mother: Lady Zhang (Note: The name "Zhang Que" (张阙) appears in Lady Zhang's biography in Nan Shi. However, "Que" could be used as a placeholder, as information on Lady Zhang was minimial.)

Emperor Shao of Liu Song ((劉)宋少帝; c. 406 – 4 August 424), also known by his post-removal title Prince of Yingyang (營陽王), personal name Liu Yifu (劉義符), childhood name Chebing (車兵), was the second emperor of the Liu Song dynasty of China. He was the oldest son of the founding emperor, Emperor Wu, and became emperor after his father's death in 422. The officials whom his father left in charge of the government became convinced that he was unfit to govern, and so deposed and killed him in 424, making his more-capable younger brother Liu Yilong (Emperor Wen) the emperor.

== During Jin Dynasty ==
Liu Yifu was born in 406, when his father Liu Yu was already a paramount general of Jin and effectively regent. His mother was Liu Yu's concubine Consort Zhang. He was Liu Yu's oldest son.

As Liu Yu consolidated his power, he began to bestow on Liu Yifu increasingly more nominal authority, although Liu Yu had his subordinates actually carry out the duties that Liu Yifu would otherwise be expected to carry out. In 415, he was officially made heir apparent of Liu Yu's dukedom of Yuzhang and made the governor of Yan Province (兗州, then modern central Jiangsu). In 416, he was made the governor of Yu Province (豫州, then modern central Anhui). Later that year, he was again made the governor of Yan Province, but also the governor of Xu Province (徐州, modern northern Jiangsu). Then, in the fall, as Liu Yu launched a major campaign to attack Later Qin, Liu Yifu was made the defender of the capital Jiankang, even though it was Liu Muzhi who had actual authority.

In 417, after Liu Yu had destroyed Later Qin and annexed its territory, Liu Muzhi died. Liu Yu then withdrew, leaving the former Later Qin capital Chang'an in the hands of Liu Yifu's younger brother Liu Yizhen (劉義真) the Duke of Guiyang, but again with generals and officials actually in charge. In 418, after he had reached Pengcheng (彭城, in modern Xuzhou, Jiangsu), he considered making Liu Yifu the governor of Jing Province (荊州, roughly modern Hubei), but at the counsel of Zhang Shao (張邵) that Liu Yifu, as the heir, should not be sent away from Jiankang, that post was given to Liu Yilong instead. When Liu Yu accepted the greater title of Duke of Song that year, Liu Yifu became the heir apparent to his dukedom, and in 419, after he was created the Prince of Song, Liu Yifu was given the special honor to be known as Crown Prince of Song. It was also around this time that he married Emperor Gong of Jin's daughter Sima Maoying the Princess Haiyan.

== During Emperor Wu's reign ==
After Liu Yu seized the throne from Emperor Gong and established Liu Song (as its Emperor Wu) in 420, he created Liu Yifu crown prince.

By 422, Emperor Wu was ill. His official Xie Hui saw that Crown Prince Yifu was often spending time with people lacking in abilities and virtue, and warned Emperor Wu about it. Emperor Wu considered making Liu Yizhen the Prince of Luling crown prince instead. Xie, however, after meeting with Liu Yizhen, had an even worse opinion of Liu Yizhen, and so Emperor Wu stopped considering so.

As Emperor Wu grew seriously ill later that year, he entrusted Crown Prince Yifu to Xu Xianzhi, Fu Liang, Xie Hui, and Tan Daoji. At the same time, however, he secretly warned Crown Prince Yifu that Xie was such a quick thinker that he could not be trusted greatly. He then died, and Crown Prince Yifu took the throne as Emperor Shao.

== Reign ==
Emperor Shao honored his stepgrandmother Xiao Wenshou as grand empress dowager, and he created his wife Crown Princess Sima Maoying as empress. The matters of the central government were largely in the hands of Xu Xianzhi, Fu Liang, and Xie Hui.

One immediate matter that needed to be dealt with was that Emperor Mingyuan of Northern Wei, hearing of Emperor Wu's death, launched a major attack on Liu Song and crossed the Yellow River. In winter 422, Northern Wei forces captured Huatai (滑台, in modern Anyang, Henan). In spring 423, they captured Luoyang. Tan Daoji was dispatched to try to save the northern cities, and he was able to save Shandong Peninsula from falling, but by summer 423, the last major Liu Song outpost on the Yellow River, Hulao (虎牢, in modern Zhengzhou, Henan), had fallen, along with Xuchang. Only then did Northern Wei stop its advances.

In fall 423, Emperor Shao honored his mother Consort Zhang as empress dowager.

By 424, Xu, Fu, and Xie had grown increasingly dissatisfied with Emperor Shao as an emperor, as Emperor Shao had failed to follow the proper behavior during the three-year mourning period for his father, but spent most of his time on games and pleasure rather than on studies and important matters of state, despite encouragement from his official Fan Tai (范泰). They therefore considered deposing him, but they were also dissatisfied with the next ranked son of Emperor Wu, Liu Yizhen, who was talented but was even more frivolous than Emperor Shao in his behavior, often spending time with other talented but frivolous men, including Xie Lingyun and Yan Yanzhi (顏延之) and often requesting the imperial government to supply him with more and more money. They therefore stoked the rivalry that Emperor Shao already had with Liu Yizhen and then accused Liu Yizhen of crimes, and Emperor Shao reduced Liu Yizhen to commoner status and exiled him to Xin'an Commandery (新安, roughly modern Hangzhou, Zhejiang).

With Liu Yizhen out of the way, Xu, Fu, and Xie prepared to remove Emperor Shao as well. Because they were apprehensive about the powerful armies that Tan and Wang Hong had, they summoned Tan and Wang to the capital and then informed them of the plot. They then sent soldiers into the palace to arrest Emperor Shao, after first persuading the imperial guards not to resist. Before Emperor Shao could get up from bed in the morning, the soldiers were already in his bedchamber, and he made a futile attempt to resist, but was captured. He was sent back to his old palace. The officials then, in the name of Empress Dowager Zhang, declared Emperor Shao's faults and demoted him to Prince of Yingyang, offering the throne to his younger brother Liu Yilong Prince of Yidu instead.

== After removal ==
Liu Yifu was exiled to Wu Commandery (roughly modern Suzhou, Jiangsu) and kept under secure guard. One month later, Xu Xianzhi sent the assassin Xing Antai (邢安泰) to assassinate the former emperor. Liu Yifu was still a strong man, and he fought his way out of the capital of Wu Commandery, but he was eventually chased down and knocked to the ground with a doorknob, and then killed.

Though Liu Yifu died sonless, in 429, Liu Lang, the eldest son of his younger brother Liu Yigong, was designated as his heir.

== Consorts ==
- Princess consort, of the Sima clan of Henei (王妃 河內司馬氏; 403–439), personal name Maoying (茂英)

== Notes ==
Regnal titles
Preceded by Emperor Wu of Liu Song	Emperor of Liu Song; 422–424	Succeeded by Emperor Wen of Liu Song
Preceded by Emperor Wu of Liu Song	Emperor of China (Southern); 422–424	Succeeded by Emperor Wen of Liu Song
Preceded by Emperor Wu of Liu Song	Emperor of China (Henan); 422–423	Succeeded by Emperor Mingyuan of Northern Wei
