= Fu Liang =

Eastern Jin and Liu Song official

Fu Liang (傅亮; 374–426), courtesy name Jiyou (季友), was a high-level official of the Chinese Liu Song dynasty, who, along with his colleagues Xu Xianzhi and Xie Hui, deposed Emperor Shao after the death of Emperor Wu (Liu Yu) due to their belief that Emperor Shao was not fit to be emperor. However, he was later arrested and killed by Emperor Shao's successor and brother Emperor Wen.
