= Liu Muzhi =

Jin dynasty official (360 - 417)

- 劉穆之

Left Deputy Director of the Secretariat (左僕射)
- In office 416–417
- Monarch: Emperor An of Jin

Personal details
- Born: 360 Pei County, Jiangsu
- Died: 27 November 417 Nanjing, Jiangsu
- Children: Liu Luzhi; Liu Shizhi; Liu Zhenzhi; Lady Liu
- Courtesy name: Daohe (道和)
- Childhood name: Daomin (道民)
- Peerage: Duke of Nankang Commandery (南康郡公)
- Posthumous name: Wenxuan (文宣)

Liu Muzhi (360–417), courtesy name Daohe, childhood name Daomin, was an official of the Jin dynasty (266–420). During the campaign against Huan Xuan, he was recruited by the Jin commander, Liu Yu (the future Emperor Wu of Liu Song) as a chief advisor, and was credited with stabilizing the state and government in the wake of the campaign. For most of his career, Liu Muzhi worked at the Jin capital of Jiankang, handling and monitoring internal affairs while Liu Yu was away on his military expeditions.

== Background and early life ==
Liu Muzhi's family were natives of Ju County, Dongguan (東莞郡; around present-day Yishui County, Shandong) and claimed descent from the Western Han dynasty prince, Liu Fei, though by Liu Muzhi's time, the family had been living in Jingkou Commandery for generations and were in poverty. He was described as being as being well-versed in the classics and histories, as he enjoyed reading from a young age. Liu's talents were appreciated by the Interior Minister of Langya, Jiang Kai (江敳), who appointed Liu to serve as one of his Chief Clerks.

In 404, the Jin general, Liu Yu raised an army in Jingkou to campaign against the usurper, Huan Xuan. He asked his fellow general, He Wuji for a recommendation for a registrar in his staff, and He recommended Liu Muzhi for the position. When a messenger from Liu Yu arrived at his home, Liu Muzhi rushed to meet with Liu Yu. During their first meeting, Liu Yu asked him, "I have only now began fighting for the righteous cause and face a daunting task. I am in need of an officer; who do you think is most suitable?" Liu Muzhi replied, "A new order calls for truly capable officers. In these desperate times, there is probably no one better but you." Liu Yu, pleased by Liu Muzhi's humility, recruited him on the spot.

== Service under Liu Yu ==
That same year, Liu Yu defeated Huan Xuan and recaptured the Jin capital, Jiankang, but there were still many internal matters that had to be resolved. Liu Yu placed Liu Muzhi in charge with executing major decisions, and also trusted him as a chief consultant. Despite the urgency, Liu Muzhi was able to quickly resolve these issues with satisfactory results. He also amended and rectified the law, which were previously lax and allowed the powerful gentry clans to oppress the common people. Within ten days, the customs and affairs had completely changed.

Around this time, Liu Muzhi successively served as Master of Writing to the Minister of Rites, then a Registrar in Liu Yu's office and then as Recordskeeping Army Advisor while concurrently serving as Administrator of Tangyi. He was also enfeoffed as a Fifth-class Viscount of Xihua County.

In 407, the Inspector of Yang province, Wang Mi died of illness. Liu Yu was expected to succeed to Wang's position, but a faction in court led by his rival, Liu Yi, wanted to undermine Liu Yu's power by keeping him away from the capital region. They sent the minister, Pi Shen (皮沈) to present to Liu Yu with two of their proposals; for the Commandant of the Central Army, Xie Hun (謝混) to become the new Inspector of Yang, or for Liu Yu to only serve as acting Inspector based in Dantu while the responsibility of central government affairs is given to Meng Chang.

Pi Shen met with Liu Muzhi and informed him of the arrangements discussed before meeting with Liu Yu. Upon hearing about their proposals, Liu Muzhi excused himself to go to the toilet and secretly sent a note to Liu Yu telling him to reject both of them. Shortly after talking with Pi Shen, Liu Yu consulted with Liu Muzhi for his reasons. Liu Muzhi explained that Liu Yu had placed himself in a powerful position that would be difficult to regain if he relinquish it to Liu Yi's faction. He further stressed the strategic importance of Yang province, and urged Liu Yu to personally attend the court to discuss the matter. In the end, Liu Yu followed Liu Muzhi's advice and was able to obtain the offices of Inspector of Yang province and Manager of the Affairs of the Masters of Writing, thus securing his central authority.

In 409, Liu Yu embarked on his northern expedition against the Southern Yan. Liu Muzhi accompanied the army in expedition, as well as in the follow-up campaign against the major rebel, Lu Xun, who threatened to capture Jiankang. In both campaigns, Liu Muzhi helped in planning and executive decisions behind the scenes. Liu Yi grew to dislike Liu Muzhi and often casually remarked to Liu Yu that he was wielding too much power, but these remarks only strengthened Liu Yu's trust in him, and he later became one of Liu Yu's Marshals.

In 412, Liu Muzhi was promoted to Intendant of Danyang. That same year, Liu Yu led a western campaign against Liu Yi in Jing province, leaving Zhuge Changmin to guard the capital with Liu Muzhi as his assistant. Zhuge had committed many illegal acts throughout his career, and with Liu Yu now turning on Liu Yi, he feared that he too would become a target. When Liu Yi's defeat and death reached Jiankang, Zhuge became increasingly uneasy and asked Liu Muzhi if Liu Yu had any animosity against him. Liu Muzhi replied, "When Lord Liu left for his expedition, he entrusted his elderly mother and young brother to you, general. How could that be even remotely true?" Zhuge was reassured by his words, but as soon as Liu Yu returned to Jiankang the following year, he was immediately put to death.

In 414, Liu Muzhi was promoted to General of the Front. In 415, when Liu Yu left for Jing province again to attack Sima Xiuzhi, Liu Muzhi once again remained at Jiankang, assisting Liu Yu's brother, Liu Daolian as Supervisor of the Masters of Writing and handling all court affairs, big or small.

In 416, Liu Yu launched another northern expedition, this time against the Later Qin dynasty. He entrusted Liu Muzhi with assisting his 10-year-old heir, Liu Yifu in guarding Jiankang, transferring Liu Muzhi to the positions of Left Deputy Director of the Secretariat, acting Supervisor of the Army and General of the Central Army. Liu Muzhi was effectively in charge of the capital, and he ensured that the administration ran smoothly in Liu Yu's absence while also organizing and supplying the expeditionary forces.

In 417, Liu Yu's forces destroyed the Later Qin and occupied the Guanzhong region. Liu Yu planned to use the Guanzhong as his base to continue his northern expedition, while at the same time, he sent a decree to Jiankang to prepare the court to grant him the Nine Bestowments, a prerequisite to claiming the imperial throne. However, when the decree arrived at Jiankang, Liu Muzhi was said to have felt ashamed and fell ill. He eventually succumbed to his illness on 27 November that year.

Liu Yu greatly grieved his death, and with no one else to guard the capital, he was forced to return to the south, and the Guanzhong was soon lost to the Helian Xia dynasty. Liu Muzhi was posthumously appointed as Regular Mounted Attendant, General of the Guards and Kaifu Yitong Sansi. Later in a memorial to the emperor praising Liu Muzhi, his posthumous offices were changed to Minister Over the Masses and Palace Attendant, with the posthumous peerage of Marquis of Nanchang County.

In 420, Liu Yu finally usurped the Jin throne and founded the Liu Song dynasty. Remembering Liu Muzhi's contributions, he elevated his title to Duke of Nankang and bestowed him the posthumous name of "Wenxuan". Liu Yu once remaked, "If Muzhi had not died, he would have helped me govern the world, but all I can say now is, 'the wise man is dead, and the nation is in ruins.'" He also lamented, "Ever since Muzhi died, the people hold nothing but contempt for me."
