= Empress Dowager Zhang (Liu Song dynasty) =

Chinese concubine of Emperor Wu of Song

Empress Dowager Zhang (張太后, personal name unknown) (died 425 or 426) was an empress dowager of the Chinese Liu Song dynasty. She was the mother of Emperor Shao (Liu Yifu) and a concubine of Emperor Wu (Liu Yu).

Virtually nothing is known of her life before 406, where she gave birth to Liu Yifu, the oldest son of Liu Yu, who was then already a paramount general of Jin. She later also gave birth to a daughter, Liu Huiyuan (劉惠媛, the later Princess Yixing). In 420, after Liu Yu seized the throne from Emperor Gong of Jin in July and established Liu Song as its first emperor, he created her an imperial consort, but not an empress, as she was not his wife. He created her son Liu Yifu as crown prince. After Emperor Wu died in June 422, Liu Yifu succeeded him as Emperor Shao, and Emperor Shao honored her as empress dowager on 30 August 423.

In 424, Emperor Shao was deposed by officials that Emperor Wu had left in charge of the government, who believed that he was unfit to be emperor, and soon they killed him. They made his capable younger half-brother Liu Yilong emperor (as Emperor Wen) instead. Initially, Empress Dowager Zhang returned her empress dowager seal and moved to Wu Commandery (around present-day Suzhou, Jiangsu), where her son was exiled and killed. After Emperor Wen arrived in Jiankang and assumed the throne, he honored her as Princess Dowager of Yingyang (营阳王太妃; as Emperor Shao carried the title Prince of Yingyang between his removal and his death). She died in 426, after having seen her son's killers largely killed by Emperor Wen earlier that year.
