= 400s (decade) =

Decade

The 400s decade ran from January 1, 400, to December 31, 409.

== Events ==
=== 400 ===
==== By place ====
====== Roman Empire ======
- January 9 – Emperor Arcadius gives his wife Aelia Eudoxia the official title of Augusta. She is able to wear the purple paludamentum and is depicted in Roman currency.
- Anthemius, praetorian prefect of the East, is sent on an embassy to the Persian capital, Ctesiphon, to congratulate King Yazdegerd I on his accession the year before.
- A riot breaks out in Constantinople; the Great Palace is burned to the ground. Gainas, a Gothic leader, attempts to evacuate his soldiers out of the city, but 7,000 armed Goths are trapped and killed by order of Arcadius. After the massacre, Gainas tries to escape across the Hellespont, but his rag-tag ad hoc fleet is destroyed by Fravitta, a Gothic chieftain in imperial service.
- Winter – Gainas leads the remaining Goths back to their homeland across the Danube. They meet the Huns and are defeated; the Hunnic chieftain Uldin sends the head of Gainas to Constantinople, where Arcadius receives it as a diplomatic gift.

====== Europe ======
- The Paeonians (Illyricum) lose their identity (approximate date).

====== Asia ======
- Richū, the eldest son of Nintoku, becomes the 17th Emperor of Japan.

==== By topic ====
====== Art ======
- Resurrection and "Two Marys with Angel near the Empty Tomb", panel of a diptych, found in Rome, is made. It is now kept at Castello Sforzesco, Milan (approximate date).

====== Literature ======
- The Vergilius Vaticanus, an illuminated manuscript containing fragments of Virgil's Aeneid and Georgics, is made in Rome.
- The Yoga Sutras of Patanjali are composed.

====== Medicine ======
- Caelius Aurelianus, Roman physician, is practising his work "De morbis acutis et chronicis" (Concerning Acute and Chronic Illness), a guide to acute and chronic diseases.

====== Physics ======
- Hypatia, Greek philosopher, distinguishes herself as one of the first female scientists and becomes head of the Neo-Platonist school at Alexandria.

====== Religion ======
- The mausoleum of Galerius in Salonica (Greece) is converted into a church.
- Bishops from Gaza (Palaestina Prima) arrive at Constantinople to ask Arcadius that he close the pagan temple of Marnas.

=== 401 ===
==== By place ====
====== Roman Empire ======
- Emperor Arcadius sends many gifts to the Hunnic chieftain Uldin, in appreciation of his victory over the Goths and Gainas. Arcadius then allies himself with the Huns.
- Piracy is committed by slave-traders from Galatia (Anatolia), along the coasts of Africa.
- The old Legio II Adiutrix, part of which had always been stationed at Aquincum (modern Budapest), is divided into two comitatenses, and shipped to Britannia.
- Stilicho, Roman general (magister militum), leads his army in an extensive campaign against the Vandals in Rhaetia (Switzerland).
- The Temple of Artemis near Selçuk in Ephesus is dismantled.
- November 18 – The Visigoths, led by king Alaric I, cross the Alps and invade northern Italy.
- Emperor Honorius begins to use the city of Ravenna as a temporary center for certain administrative and military functions. The city is chosen because of its proximity to the bulk of the Western Roman army and due to the fact that its relative poverty makes it a less tempting target for barbarian invaders than cities such as Rome or Milan. This event is often misinterpreted as the establishment of Ravenna as a capital. In reality, the capital of the Western Roman Empire was not truly established at Ravenna until 408.

====== Black Sea ======
- The Chronicon Pachale (Paschal Chronicle) reports that the Black Sea is completely frozen.

====== China ======
- Kumarajiva, Kuchean Buddhist monk, arrives in Chang'an and begins translating Buddhist texts into Chinese.

==== By topic ====
====== Religion ======
- December 19 – Pope Anastasius I dies at Rome after a 2-year reign, and is succeeded by Innocent I as the 40th pope proclaiming his universal power over the whole of Christendom.
- The Mahabharata, an Indian Sanskrit epic, is finalised.

=== 402 ===
==== By place ====
====== Roman Empire ======
- The Visigoths advance on Mediolanum (modern Milan) and besiege Asti in Liguria. King Alaric I sends envoys to negotiate a peace, but the Roman government refuses to make deals with "barbarians."
- April 6 – Battle of Pollentia: Stilicho recalls troops from Britain and the Rhine frontier to defend Italy. He decides to attack the Goths on Easter Sunday, and manages to capture Alaric's wife and children.
- Emperors Arcadius and his younger brother Honorius become Roman consuls.

====== Asia ======
- King Gwanggaeto the Great of Goguryeo (Korea) defeats the forces of Later Yan, seizing some of their border fortresses.
- The Rouran, led by Shelun (Chö-louen), having defeated the Gaoju Dingling (Kao-kiu Ting-ling) near Kobbo, establish a nomadic empire that ranges from the Mongolian Plateau to the Irtysh.
- Fa-Hien, Chinese Buddhist monk, makes a pilgrimage to India, initiating Sino-Indian relations. Stirred by his faith to Buddhism, he visits the sites of Siddhartha Gautama's life.
- Silseong becomes king of the Korean kingdom of Silla.

==== By topic ====
====== Religion ======
- Jerome writes "Apologiae contra Rufinum" and "Liber tertius seu ultima responsio adversus scripta Rufini".
- The Pure Land school of Buddhism founds a monastery upon the top of Mount Lushan.
- Cynegius, acting for Emperor Arcadius at the insistence of Bishop Porphyry, orders the destruction of pagan temples in Gaza.

=== 403 ===
==== By place ====
====== Roman Empire ======
- June – Battle of Verona: The Visigoths, under command of King Alaric I, invade Italy again, and advance through the Brenner Pass. Stilicho, with an army of 30,000 men, defeats the Goths north of Verona. Alaric makes a truce, and withdraws eastward to Illyricum.
- Emperor Honorius and Stilicho are honored with a triumphal march, for the victories against the Goths and Vandals. This becomes the last victory celebrated in Rome.
- Theodosius II, age 2, becomes consul of the Eastern Roman Empire.

====== Asia ======
- Hui Yuan argues that Buddhist monks should be exempt from bowing to the emperor.
- Asin of Baekje allies with Silla against Gwanggaeto the Great of Goguryeo (Korea).

==== By topic ====
====== Religion ======
- The Synod of the Oak deposes and banishes John Chrysostom, bishop of Constantinople, but shortly afterward he is recalled only to be banished again.

=== 404 ===
==== By place ====
====== Roman Empire ======
- January 1 – Last known gladiator fight in Rome: This date is usually given as the date of the martyrdom of Saint Telemachus, a Christian monk who was stoned by the crowd for trying to stop a gladiators' fight in a Roman amphitheatre.
- October 6 – Empress Eudoxia has her seventh and last pregnancy, which ends in a miscarriage. She is left bleeding and dies of an infection shortly after.
- Fravitta, a Goth serving the Eastern Roman Empire as a high-ranking general, is executed on the behest of a powerful official named Ioannes. Fravitta is executed because he accused Ioannes of pitting Emperor Arcadius and Emperor Honorius (of the Eastern and Western Roman Empires, respectively) against each other. The execution of Fravitta results in the Eastern Roman Empire losing one of their most loyal and competent generals. (404 or 405)

====== Asia ======
- Gwanggaeto the Great of Goguryeo (Korea) attacks Liaodong and takes the entire Liaodong Peninsula.
- The Chinese Buddhist monk Huiyuan, who founded the Pure Land Buddhism sect and the monastery on Mount Lushan, writes the book On Why Monks Do Not Bow Down Before Kings in this year. In his book he argues that although the Buddhist clergy should remain independent and undisturbed by politics, the Buddhist laymen nonetheless make good subjects under monarchs, due to their fear of retribution of karma and desire to be reborn in paradise.

==== By topic ====
====== Religion ======
- Eudoxia exiles John Chrysostom, bishop of Constantinople, for criticizing her sumptuous lifestyle. He is banished to the Caucasus in Armenia. Pope Innocent I at Rome orders a synod to reinstate the bishop, but his envoys are imprisoned. Atticus becomes the new bishop of Constantinople.

=== 405 ===
==== By place ====
====== Roman Empire ======
- Emperor Honorius closes the Flavian Amphitheatre (Colosseum), in an austerity move that abolishes amusements.
- Stilicho, Roman general (magister militum), orders the Sibylline Books to be burned, according to the Roman poet Rutilius Claudius Namatianus.
- Stilicho crushes a coalition of Asding Vandals, Ostrogoths and Quadi with an army raised from forces of the Rhine frontier, leaving this sector dangerously weakened.
- War of Radagaisus: King Radagaisus leads an invasion with a force of 20,000 men and crosses the Alps. He spends the winter in the Po Valley and is observed by Stilicho, who lacks sufficient strength to prepare an offensive against the invading German tribes. The exact numbers of the migration are unknown, probably nearly 100,000, including Alans, Burgundians, Goths, Vandals, and other smaller tribes.
- Flavius Aetius is sent as a child hostage at the court of Alaric I, king of the Visigoths.

====== Asia ======
- The Khitan are first mentioned in Chinese chronicles. They wander along the boundaries of Kara-muren, and form part of the Donghu (Tong-hou) confederation.
- Jeonji becomes king of the Korean kingdom of Baekje.

==== By topic ====
====== Arts and Sciences ======
- The Armenian alphabet is devised by Mesrop Mashtots.
- The Japanese court officially adopts the Chinese writing system (approximate date).
- Theon of Alexandria, Greek mathematician, dies at age 70 (approximate), having been helped in his work by his daughter Hypatia.

====== Religion ======
- Jerome's Vulgate translation of the Bible into Latin is completed by his translations of the Tanakh from the Hebrew language.
- In the Roman province of Africa, Augustine of Hippo opposes Donatism as a heresy.

=== 406 ===
==== By place ====
====== Roman Empire ======
- Radagaisus is forced to retreat into the hills of Fiesole. There he tries to escape, but is captured by the Romans.

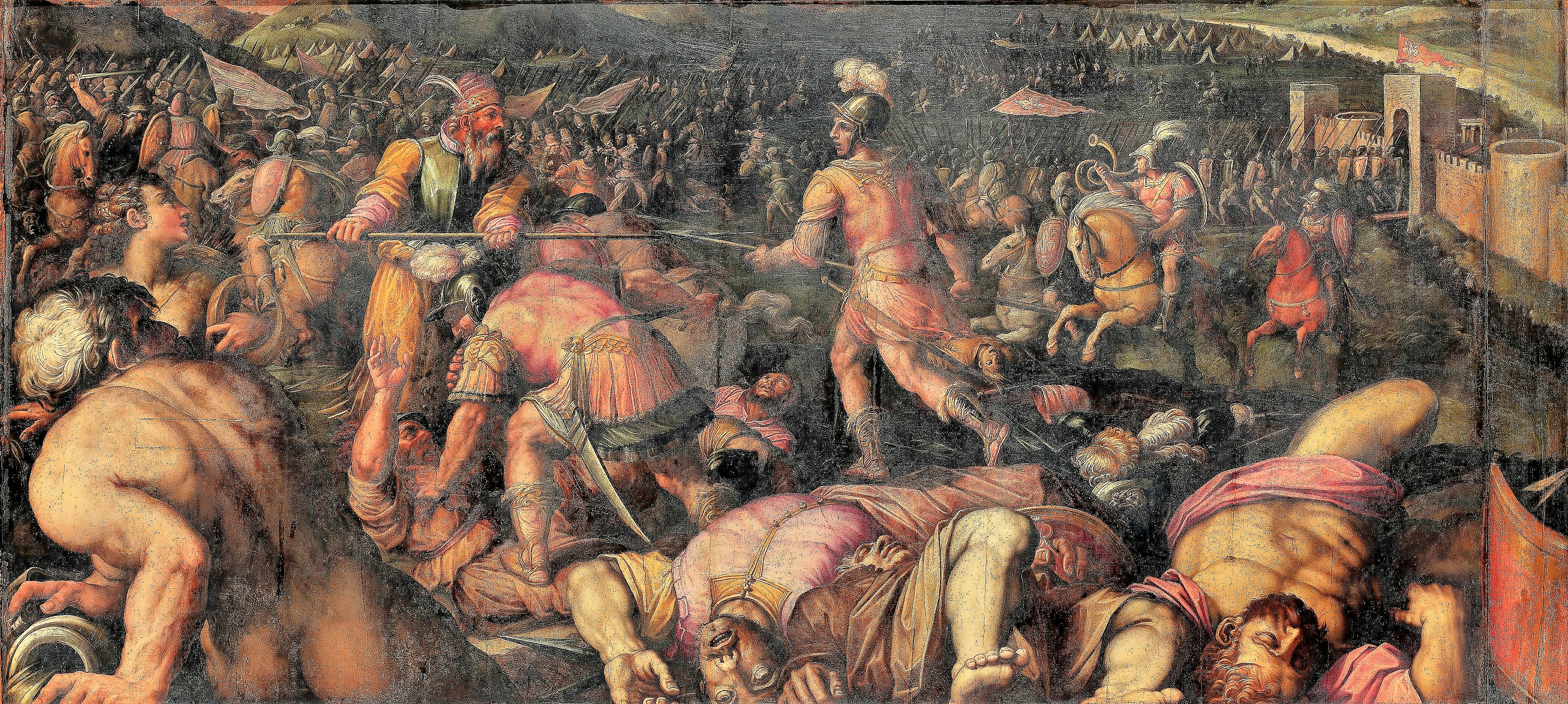
Defeat of Radagaisus at Fiesole

- August 23 – Radagaisus is executed; 12,000 "barbarians" are incorporated into the Roman army, or sold as slaves.
- Autumn – The remaining Roman legions in Britain decide to mutiny. The usurper Marcus is proclaimed emperor.
- Vandal-Frankish war: The Vandals, led by Godigisel, are intercepted and defeated by the Franks under Marcomir. Godigisel is killed in battle and succeeded by his son Gunderic.
- December 31 – Vandals, Alans and Suebians cross the Rhine at Mogontiacum (modern Mainz), beginning an invasion of Gaul (traditional date, this may have occurred in 405).

====== Asia ======
- Faxian, Chinese traveler, arrives in India. He visits the major seats of Buddhist learning (Udyana, Peshawar, and Taxila).
- Hanzei succeeds his brother Richu, and becomes the 18th emperor of Japan in the traditional order of succession.

==== By topic ====
====== Agriculture ======
- Cultivation of rye, oats, hops, and spelt (a wheat used for livestock feed) is introduced in Europe by the native Vandals, Alans, and Sciri, who also introduce a heavy wheeled plow to be used for farming.

====== Religion ======
- Stained glass is used for the first time in churches in Rome.

=== 407 ===
==== By place ====
====== Roman Empire ======
- Gratian, Roman usurper, is installed as emperor after the death of Marcus. According to Orosius, he is a native Briton of the urban aristocracy.
- Gratian is assassinated and Constantine III, a general (magister militum), declares himself Roman emperor. To extend his dominion over Gaul and Spain, he takes practically all the Roman garrisons from Britain and crosses the English Channel. Constantine occupies Arles and establishes tenuous authority over Gaul, sharing control with marauding "barbarians". This is generally seen as the beginning of Rome's withdrawal from Britain.
- End of Roman rule in Britain: After 360 years of occupation, the local regional British-Roman leaders raise their own levies for defence against Saxon sea rovers. They cultivate oysters, having learned the technique from the Romans.

====== China ======
- Liu Bobo (Xia Wuliedi) founds the state of Xia, and claims the title "Heavenly Prince" (Tian Wang).

=== 408 ===
==== By place ====
====== Roman Empire ======
- May 1 – Emperor Arcadius dies in his palace at Constantinople, after a weak 13-year reign. He is succeeded by his 7-year-old son, Theodosius II, who rules under the domination of his devout Christian sister Pulcheria and Anthemius, who acts as regent.
- Summer – Emperor Honorius marries Thermantia, second daughter of Stilicho, his famous general (magister militum).
- The Roman usurper Constantine III establishes his headquarters at Arles (Southern Gaul) and elevates his eldest son, Constans, to the rank of Caesar. He sends him with an expeditionary force under Gerontius to Hispania, in order to suppress the revolt of some members of the House of Theodosius, who are loyal to Honorius.
- August 22 – Stilicho is accused of treason against Honorius and is decapitated at Ravenna. His Hun bodyguard is killed; mass murders of Vandal soldiers follow.
- The Hexamilion wall is constructed. Fortifications are built across the Isthmus of Corinth, guarding the only land route into the Peloponnese peninsula from Greece.
- September – King Alaric I of the Visigoths crosses the Julian Alps with an army of 30,000 men, and marches into the Roman heartland. He lays siege to Rome, and Gothic auxiliaries desert to join Alaric's forces. After much bargaining, the Senate agrees to pay him a ransom of 5,000 pounds of gold, 30,000 pounds of silver, 4,000 silken tunics, and 3,000 hides dyed scarlet.
- Alaric also demands, and obtains, the freedom of 30,000 people who had been enslaved in Rome.
- The Huns under Uldin cross the lower Danube and attack the Eastern Roman Empire, setting fire to frontier forts and taking control of the Castra Martis (modern Bulgaria). The Romans negotiate for peace, but Uldin demands an exorbitant gold tribute in return for his withdrawal. This demand is rejected and Anthemius forces the Huns back across the Danube.
- Attila, age 2, is sent as a child hostage to the court at Rome and in return, the Romans send Flavius Aetius to the Huns.

====== Persia ======
- King Yazdegerd I of Persia maintains cordial relations with the Roman Empire. He becomes an executor of Arcadius' will and is entrusted with the care of the young Theodosius II until he comes of age.

==== By topic ====
====== Medicine ======
- Alaric I exacts a tribute from Rome that includes 3,000 pounds of pepper. The spice is valued for alleged medicinal virtues and for disguising spoilage in meat that is past its prime.

=== 409 ===
==== By place ====
====== Roman Empire ======
- Spring – Gerontius, Roman general (magister militum), who had been a partisan of Constantine III, revolts in Hispania. He elevates Maximus, his domesticus, as emperor.
- October 13 – The Vandals, led by King Gunderic, cross the Pyrenees into the Iberian Peninsula. They receive land from the Romans, as foederati, in Baetica (Southern Spain). The Alans occupy lands in Lusitania and the Suebi control parts of Gallaecia.
- The Visigothic king Alaric I lays siege to Rome a second time, bringing the inhabitants close to starvation. Emperor Honorius, safe in inaccessible Ravenna, refuses to negotiate for peace, despite repeated offers from Alaric, who then comes to terms with the Senate and sets up a rival emperor, Priscus Attalus, prefect (praefectus urbi) of the city.
- Honorius agrees that sons of prominent families at court in Ravenna be sent beyond the Danube as hostages; in return, later he calls up ten thousand Hun mercenaries.
- Famine strikes Hispania, Gaul and the Italian Peninsula.
- Bacaudic Rebellion: Peasants in Armorica, northwestern Gallia launch a revolt. The unrest continues until 417.

====== Asia ======
- Mingyuan, age 17, succeeds Daowu as emperor of the Chinese Northern Wei (one of the Northern dynasties).
- Battle of Linqu: Southern Yan is defeated by Eastern Jin.

== Births ==
400

- Aspar, Alan patrician and general (magister militum) (approximate date)
- Bahram V, Sasanian King of Kings (shahanshah)
- Hassan Yuha'min, king of the Himyarite Kingdom
- Hydatius, bishop of Aquae Flaviae (modern Chaves, Portugal) (approximate date)
- Pope Leo I, Bishop of Rome
- Qusayy ibn Kilab, Ishmaelite descendant of Abraham
- Salvian, Christian writer (approximate date)
- Sozomen, Christian Church historian

401

- April 10 – Theodosius II, Roman emperor (d. 450)
- Aelia Eudocia, Roman empress and wife of Theodosius II (approximate date)
- Leo I, Byzantine Emperor (d. 474)

403

- Hilary, bishop of Arles (d. 449)
- Yuan He, official of the Northern Wei Dynasty (d. 479)

405

- Ricimer, de facto ruler of the Western Roman Empire (approximate date)
- Salvian, Christian writer (approximate date)
- Yuan Qigui, empress and wife of Wen of Liu Song (d. 440)

406

- Attila the Hun, ruler of the Hunnic Empire (approximate date) (d. 453)
- Lu Xiujing
- Shao Di, emperor of the Liu Song dynasty (d. 424)

407

- Wen Di, Chinese emperor of the Liu Song dynasty (d. 453)

408

- Tai Wu Di, emperor of the Northern Wei Dynasty (d. 452)

409

- Daniel the Stylite, Christian saint (approximate date)
- Liu Yikang, prince of the Liu Song Dynasty (d. 451)

== Deaths ==
400

- Castor of Karden, Christian priest and hermit
- Duan, Chinese empress and wife of Murong Bao
- Gainas, Gothic chieftain and general (magister militum)
- Li Lingrong, empress and mother of Jin Xiaowudi
- Lü Guang, emperor of the Di state Later Liang (b. 337)
- Lü Shao, "Heavenly Prince" (Tian Wang) of Later Liang
- Oribasius, Greek medical writer and physician

401

- December 19 – Pope Anastasius I
- Duan Ye, prince of the Chinese state Northern Liang
- Lü Zuan, emperor of the Di state Later Liang
- Murong Sheng, emperor of the Xianbei state Later Yan (b. 373)
- Empress Yang, wife of Lü Zuan

402

- Empress Dowager Ding, mother of Murong Sheng
- Quintus Aurelius Symmachus, Roman consul and intellectual
- Sima Yuanxian, regent during the Jin Dynasty (b. 382)
- Tufa Lilugu, prince of the Xianbei state Southern Liang

403

- Epiphanius of Salamis, Church Father
- Sima Daozi, regent of the Eastern Jin Dynasty (b. 364)

404

- January 1 – Telemachus, Christian monk and martyr
- February – Flavian I, Patriarch of Antioch
- June 19 – Huan Xuan, warlord and emperor of the Jin Dynasty (b. 369)
- October 6 – Aelia Eudoxia, Roman Empress and wife of Arcadius
- Claudian, Roman poet (approximate date)
- He Fani, empress of the Jin dynasty (b. 339)
- Paula, Desert Mother and saint (b. 347)

405

- June 26 – Saint Vigilius, bishop of Trent (b. 353)
- November 11 – Arsacius of Tarsus, archbishop of Constantinople
- Moses the Black, Christian monk and priest (b. 330)
- Murong De, emperor of the Xianbei state Southern Yan (b. 336)
- Richu, emperor of Japan (approximate date)
- Theon of Alexandria, last director of the Library of Alexandria (approximate date)

406

- August 23 – Radagaisus, Gothic king
- Alban of Mainz, priest and martyr (approximate date)
- Godigisel, king of the Vandals
- Gu Kaizhi, Chinese painter (b. c. 344)
- Zhang Tianxi, ruler of Former Liang (b. 346)

407

- Fu Xunying, empress of the Xianbei state Later Yan
- Gratian, Roman usurper
- John Chrysostom, archbishop of Constantinople
- Marcus, Roman usurper
- Maria, empress consort and wife of Honorius
- Murong Xi, emperor of the Xianbei state Later Yan (b. 385)
- Victricius, missionary and bishop of Rouen (approximate date)

408

- May 1 – Arcadius, Roman Emperor
- May 4 – Venerius, bishop of Milan and Saint
- August 22 – Stilicho, Roman general

409

- Daowu, emperor of the Northern Wei (b. 371)
- Gao Yun, emperor of the Northern Yan
- Li of Yan, empress, wife of Gao Yun (who died the same year)
- Mallius Theodorus, Roman consul (approximate date)
- Serena, noblewoman and wife of Stilicho
