= 453 =

453 in various calendars
- Gregorian calendar: 453; CDLIII
- Ab urbe condita: 1206
- Assyrian calendar: 5203
- Balinese saka calendar: 374–375
- Bengali calendar: −141 – −140
- Berber calendar: 1403
- Buddhist calendar: 997
- Burmese calendar: −185
- Byzantine calendar: 5961–5962
- Chinese calendar: 壬辰年 (Water Dragon); 3150 or 2943 — to — 癸巳年 (Water Snake); 3151 or 2944
- Coptic calendar: 169–170
- Discordian calendar: 1619
- Ethiopian calendar: 445–446
- Hebrew calendar: 4213–4214
- Hindu calendars
- Vikram Samvat: 509–510
- Shaka Samvat: 374–375
- Kali Yuga: 3553–3554
- Holocene calendar: 10453
- Iranian calendar: 169 BP – 168 BP
- Islamic calendar: 174 BH – 173 BH
- Javanese calendar: 338–339
- Julian calendar: 453; CDLIII
- Korean calendar: 2786
- Minguo calendar: 1459 before ROC 民前1459年
- Nanakshahi calendar: −1015
- Seleucid era: 764/765 AG
- Thai solar calendar: 995–996
- Tibetan calendar: ཆུ་ཕོ་འབྲུག་ལོ་ (male Water-Dragon); 579 or 198 or −574 — to — ཆུ་མོ་སྦྲུལ་ལོ་ (female Water-Snake); 580 or 199 or −573

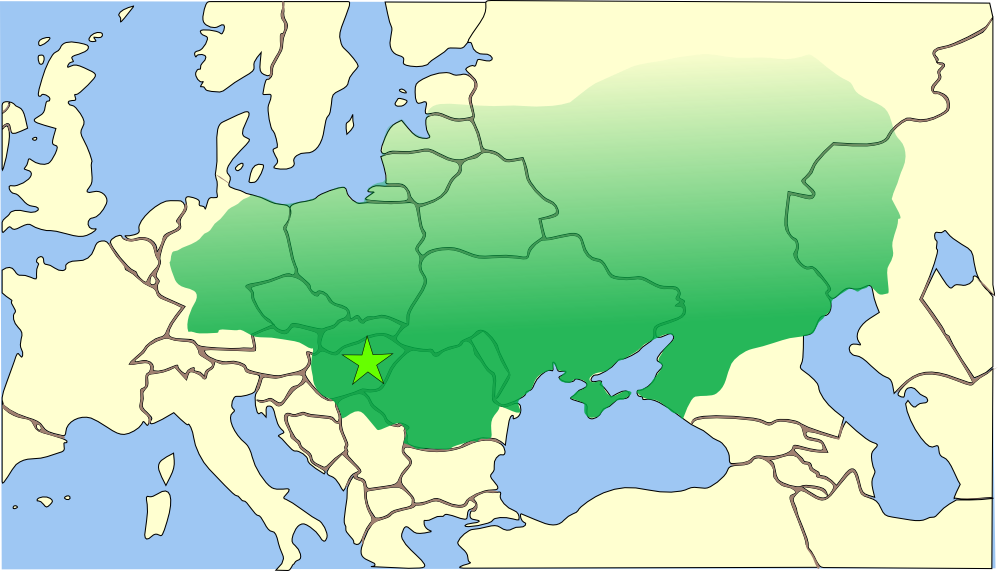
The Hunnic Empire (453)

Year 453 (CDLIII) was a common year starting on Thursday of the Julian calendar. At the time, it was known as the Year of the Consulship of Opilio and Vincomalus (or, less frequently, year 1206 Ab urbe condita). The denomination 453 for this year has been used since the early medieval period, when the Anno Domini calendar era became the prevalent method in Europe for naming years.

== Events ==
=== By place ===
==== Byzantium ====
- July – Empress Pulcheria dies of natural causes at Constantinople. She has commissioned many new churches in the city during her reign. Her death leaves Flavius Aspar (magister militum) as the dominant influence on her husband, Marcian.
- Anthemius marries Marcia Euphemia, daughter of Marcian, and is elevated to the rank of comes. He is sent to the Danubian frontier to rebuild the border defences.

==== Europe ====
- c. March – Attila the Hun is found dead in bed, after a wedding feast with the Goth princess Ildico. He dies of a nosebleed at his Hungarian stronghold, drowning in his own blood, aged about 47. The Huns celebrate a strava (lamentation) over his burial place with great feasting. Attila's son Ellac is appointed successor, but his brothers Dengizich and Ernakh divide the Hunnic Empire by establishing their own kingdoms north of the Black Sea (Ukraine), supported by vassal states.
- Theodoric II succeeds his brother Thorismund as king of the Visigoths, Thorismund having been murdered after he violated the alliance with the Western Roman Empire.

==== Asia ====
- March 16 – Emperor Wen of Song is assassinated by his sons Liu Shao and Liu Jun, Prince Shixing, so that Liu Shao can become emperor.
- May 20 – Liu Shao is overthrown by another brother, Liu Jun who becomes Emperor Xiaowu of Song.
- May 27 – Liu Shao is executed, together with other members of his family.
- Ankō obtains the throne of his father Ingyō after the traditional order of succession and becomes the 20th emperor of Japan. His eldest brother Prince Kinashi no Karu commits suicide after being accused of an incestuous relationship with his sister Karu no Ōiratsume (according to the Nihon Shoki).

== Births ==
- Brigit of Kildare, Irish patron saint (d. 524)
- Vedast, Frankish bishop (approximate date)

== Deaths ==
- c. March – Attila, ruler of the Huns (b. 406)
- March 16 – Emperor Wen of Song, assassinated (b. 407)
- May 27 – executed:
  - Liu Jun, Prince Shixing of the Liu Song dynasty (b. 429)
  - Liu Shao, emperor of Liu Song (b. 426)
  - Pan, concubine of Wen Di
  - Empress Yin of Liu Song, forced suicide
- July – Pulcheria, Byzantine Empress
- Helian, empress of Northern Wei
- Thorismund, king of the Visigoths, assassinated
- Approximate traditional date:
  - Emperor Ingyō of Japan
  - Prince Kinashi no Karu of Japan
