= Empress Yin =

Empress Yin may mean or refer to:

- Empress Yin Lihua (陰麗華) (5–64), wife of Emperor Guangwu of Han
- Empress Yin (He) (陰皇后) (died 102), wife of Emperor He of Han
- Empress Yin Yuying (殷玉英) (died 453), wife of Liu Shao of Liu Song
- Lady Yin (尹夫人), first wife of Emperor Taizong of Song, posthumously honored an empress
