= 400s =

400s may refer to:

- The period from 400 to 499, almost synonymous with the 5th century (401–500)
- The period from 400 to 409, known as the 400s decade, almost synonymous with the 41st decade (401-410)
