= 404th =

404th may refer to:

- 404th Air Expeditionary Group, provisional United States Air Force unit assigned to the United States Air Forces in Europe
- 404th Bombardment Squadron or 904th Air Refueling Squadron, inactive United States Air Force unit
- 404th Fighter Group, inactive United States Army Air Force unit
- 404th Fighter Squadron or 186th Fighter Squadron flies the F-15C Eagle
- 404th Maneuver Enhancement Brigade, maneuver enhancement brigade of the United States Army National Guard in Illinois

== See also ==
- 404 (number)
- 404 (disambiguation)
- 404, the year 404 (CDIV) of the Julian calendar
- 404 BC
