= 429 (disambiguation) =

429 was a year of the Julian calendar.

429 may also refer to:

- ARINC 429, an avionics databus
- Bell 429 GlobalRanger, a helicopter
- Building 429, a Christian band
- 429 Records, a record label
- 429 Too Many Requests, an HTTP Status code
