= List of great powers =

A great power is a sovereign state that is recognized as having the ability and expertise to exert its influence on a global scale.

== Great powers by time period ==
- List of ancient great powers, a list of great powers before the year 500 AD
- List of medieval great powers, a list of great powers after the year 400 to 1500
- List of modern great powers, a list of great powers since the year 1500 to the present

== See also ==
- Category:Disambiguation pages
