= 404 =

404 may refer to:

- 404 (number)
- AD 404
- 404 BC
- HTTP 404, the HTTP error response status for "Not Found"

== Cars ==
- Peugeot 404, a large family car
- Bristol 404, a luxury car
- Unimog 404, an offroad-capable truck

== Highways ==
- A404(M) motorway, in England
- Ontario Highway 404, in Canada
- Maryland Route 404, in the U.S.
- List of highways numbered 404

== Other uses ==
- 404 Error Not Found (film), a 2011 Hindi film
- 404 Media, online publication focusing on technology and internet reporting
- Project 404, a United States military mission to Laos during the Vietnam War
- Pakistan International Airlines Flight 404, a Fokker F27 that disappeared on 25 August 1989
- Alitalia Flight 404, a McDonnell Douglas DC-9 that crashed on 14 November 1990 killing all on board
- Martin 4-0-4, an American pressurized passenger airliner built by the Glenn L. Martin Company
- Area code 404, a telephone area in Atlanta
- Section 404 of the 2002 Sarbanes–Oxley Act
- Room 404 – The Wrong Man, the second room in the 1995 film Four Rooms
- "404", a song by Ram Jam from the 1977 album Ram Jam
- "404", a 2018 song by Error

== See also ==
- 404th (disambiguation)
- The 404 (disambiguation)
