= 429 =

429 in various calendars
Gregorian calendar	429; CDXXIX
Ab urbe condita	1182
Assyrian calendar	5179
Balinese saka calendar	350–351
Bengali calendar	−165 – −164
Berber calendar	1379
Buddhist calendar	973
Burmese calendar	−209
Byzantine calendar	5937–5938
Chinese calendar	戊辰年 (Earth Dragon); 3126 or 2919 — to — 己巳年 (Earth Snake); 3127 or 2920
Coptic calendar	145–146
Discordian calendar	1595
Ethiopian calendar	421–422
Hebrew calendar	4189–4190
- Hindu calendars
Vikram Samvat	485–486
Shaka Samvat	350–351
Kali Yuga	3529–3530
Holocene calendar	10429
Iranian calendar	193 BP – 192 BP
Islamic calendar	199 BH – 198 BH
Javanese calendar	313–314
Julian calendar	429; CDXXIX
Korean calendar	2762
Minguo calendar	1483 before ROC 民前1483年
Nanakshahi calendar	−1039
Seleucid era	740/741 AG
Thai solar calendar	971–972
Tibetan calendar	ས་ཕོ་འབྲུག་ལོ་ (male Earth-Dragon); 555 or 174 or −598 — to — ས་མོ་སྦྲུལ་ལོ་ (female Earth-Snake); 556 or 175 or −597

Year 429 (CDXXIX) was a common year starting on Tuesday of the Julian calendar. At the time, it was known as the Year of the Consulship of Florentius and Dionysius (or, less frequently, year 1182 Ab urbe condita). The denomination 429 for this year has been used since the early medieval period, when the Anno Domini calendar era became the prevalent method in Europe for naming years. However, you can call it the 429th year of the Common Era and the Anno Domini designation, the 429th year of the first millennium, the 29th year of the 5th century, and the 10th and last year of the 420s decade.

== Events ==
=== By place ===
==== Roman Empire ====
- Spring – The Vandals, led by Genseric ("Caesar King"), invade North Africa. They land with a force of 80,000 men including Alans, and Germanic tribesmen with their families from the Iberian Peninsula, across the narrow Strait of Gibraltar. The Vandal fleet raids the coasts of the Mediterranean Sea, and blockades the grain and oil supply to Italy.
- Genseric seizes lands from the Berbers and destroys church buildings all over Mauretania. He goes on a rampage forcing Bonifacius, Roman governor, to retreat to the fortified coastal town of Hippo Regius (modern Annaba).
- Bonifacius, weakened by the civil war against empress Galla Placidia, sues for peace and is elevated to the rank of supreme commander (magister militum) of Africa.
- Emperor Theodosius II starts to reform the Codex Theodosianus in Constantinople. He establishes a committee to codify all Roman laws. All funds raised by Jews to support schools have to be turned over to the state treasury.
- The Temple of Goddess Athena on the Acropolis of Athens is sacked. Athenian Pagans are persecuted.

=== By topic ===
==== Religion ====
- Pope Celestine I dispatches two bishops from Gaul, Germanus of Auxerre and Lupus of Troyes to Britain combat the Pelagian heresy.
- Hilary succeeds his kinsman Honoratus and becomes archbishop of Arles.
- Domnus II, future patriarch of Antioch, is ordained as a deacon.

== Births ==
- Liu Jun, prince of the Liu Song dynasty (d. 453)
- Zu Chongzhi, Chinese mathematician (d. 500)

== Deaths ==
- January 6 – Honoratus, archbishop of Arles
- Heremigarius, military leader of the Suebi
