= Empress Yin (Liu Song) =

Empress Yin (died 27 May 453) was briefly an empress of the Chinese Liu Song dynasty. Her husband was Liu Shao, the crown prince of Emperor Wen who killed his father in 453 and briefly became emperor.

Lady Yin was a daughter of Yin Chun (殷淳), an official under Emperor Wen, who died in 434 at the age of 31. Lady Yin's grandfather was Yin Mu (殷穆), also an official of Liu Song. Emperor Wen married her to Liu Shao, already his crown prince at that point, on 14 May 438, when he was 12; she was likely around that age as well. She carried the title of crown princess thereafter. It appears likely, although far from certain, that his oldest son Liu Weizhi (劉偉之), was her son.

In spring 453, after Liu Shao had become aware that his father intended to depose him because he and his brother Liu Jun, courtesy name "Xiuming" and the Prince of Shixing, had engaged the witch Yan Daoyu (嚴道育) to curse him to death (so that Liu Shao could become emperor), he carried out a coup d'etat, assassinated Emperor Wen, and took over as emperor. There was no evidence that Crown Princess Yin was involved in the plot, although her uncle Yin Chong (殷沖) thereafter became a key official for Liu Shao. Liu Shao created Crown Princess Yin empress and Liu Weizhi crown prince. During the subsequent war between Liu Shao and his brother Liu Xiulong the Prince of Wuling, Yin Chong was heavily involved in the logistics planning and propaganda for Liu Shao.

Two and a half months after Liu Shao had assassinated Emperor Wen, he was captured and executed by Liu Xiulong, who had by then taken the throne as Emperor Xiaowu. Empress Yin was captured and forced to commit suicide. Before doing so, she made the comment to Emperor Xiaowu's official Jiang Ke (江恪), who was charged with the task of seeing that she did kill herself, "The Lius are killing each other. Why kill me, an innocent person?" Jiang responded, "You are the empress. How can you say that you are innocent?" She responded, "This was but temporary; he would have soon created Wang Yingwu (王鸚鵡, a servant girl who had been the liaison between Liu Shao and Yan Daoyu) empress." Whether her assertion was true or not is unclear, although it was evidence that her marital relationship with Liu Shao was hardly a strong one. As all four sons of Liu Shao were also executed, and his daughters were forced to commit suicide, none of her children, if any, would have survived.

Chinese royalty
Preceded by Empress Yuan Qigui	Empress of Liu Song; 453	Succeeded by Empress Wang Xianyuan
