= The 404 (disambiguation) =

The 404 is a colloquial reference to Ontario Highway 404.

The 404 may also refer to:

- HTTP 404
- Area code 404, in Atlanta
- The 404 Show, an audio and video podcast on CNET Video

== See also ==
- 404 (disambiguation)
