= AD 500 =

Calendar year

500 in various calendars
- Gregorian calendar: 500; D
- Ab urbe condita: 1253
- Assyrian calendar: 5250
- Balinese saka calendar: 421–422
- Bengali calendar: −94 – −93
- Berber calendar: 1450
- Buddhist calendar: 1044
- Burmese calendar: −138
- Byzantine calendar: 6008–6009
- Chinese calendar: 己卯年 (Earth Rabbit); 3197 or 2990 — to — 庚辰年 (Metal Dragon); 3198 or 2991
- Coptic calendar: 216–217
- Discordian calendar: 1666
- Ethiopian calendar: 492–493
- Hebrew calendar: 4260–4261
- Hindu calendars
- Vikram Samvat: 556–557
- Shaka Samvat: 421–422
- Kali Yuga: 3600–3601
- Holocene calendar: 10500
- Iranian calendar: 122 BP – 121 BP
- Islamic calendar: 126 BH – 125 BH
- Javanese calendar: 386–387
- Julian calendar: 500; D
- Korean calendar: 2833
- Minguo calendar: 1412 before ROC 民前1412年
- Nanakshahi calendar: −968
- Seleucid era: 811/812 AG
- Thai solar calendar: 1042–1043
- Tibetan calendar: ས་མོ་ཡོས་ལོ་ (female Earth-Hare); 626 or 245 or −527 — to — ལྕགས་ཕོ་འབྲུག་ལོ་ (male Iron-Dragon); 627 or 246 or −526

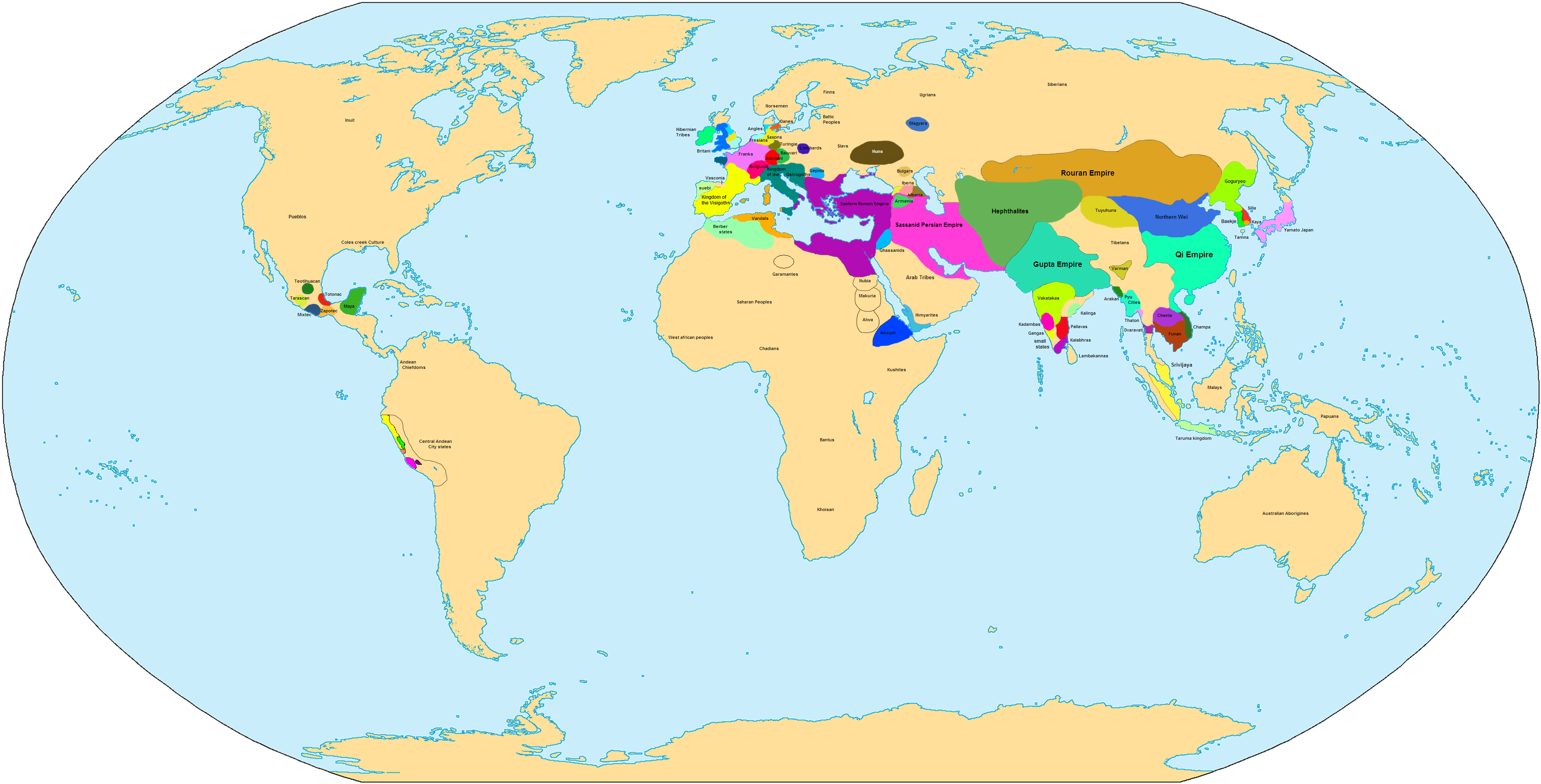
The world in 500

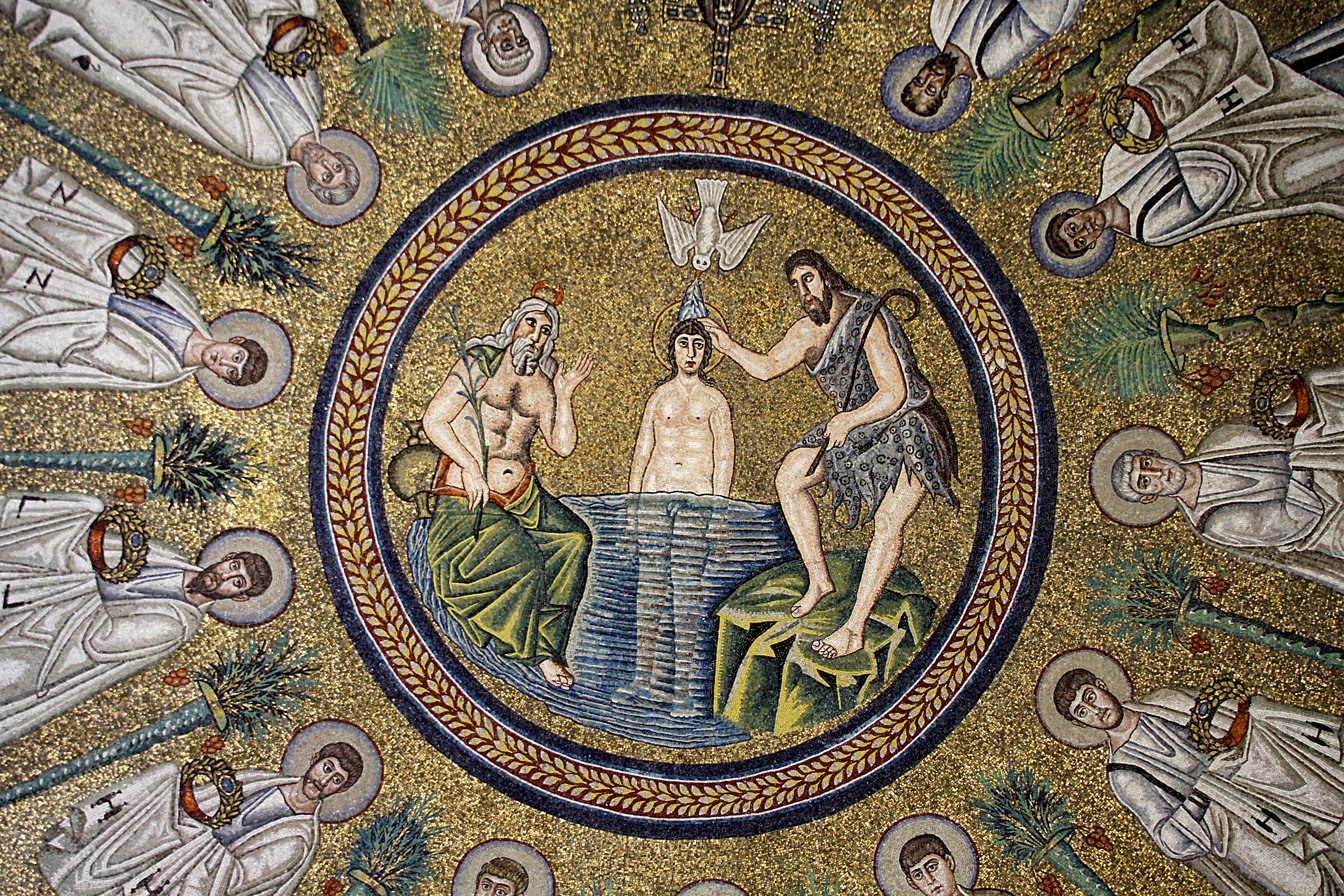
Mosaic of the Arian Baptistry

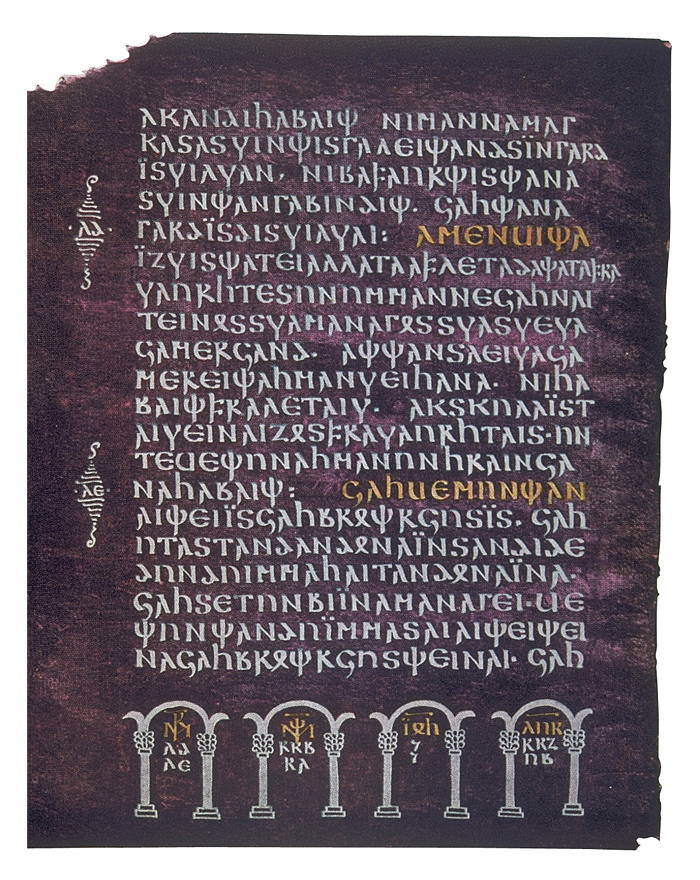
Codex Argenteus (c. 500)

Year 500 (D in Roman numerals) was a leap year starting on Saturday of the Julian calendar. At the time, it was known as the Year of the Consulship of Patricius and Hypatius (or, less frequently, year 1253 Ab urbe condita). The denomination 500 for this year has been used since the early medieval period, when the Anno Domini calendar era became the prevalent method in Europe for naming years. The year 500 AD is considered the beginning of the Middle Ages, approximately.

== Events ==
=== By place ===
==== Byzantine Empire ====
- Emperor Anastasius I concludes treaties with a number of nomad tribes in northern Arabia. In return for tribute to the Byzantine Empire and military defense of these eastern territories, such tribes are permitted to settle and farm agricultural lands in Arabia (approximate date).

Britannia

- Possible date for the Battle of Mons Badonicus: Romano-British and Celts defeat an Anglo-Saxon army, that may have been led by the bretwalda Aelle of Sussex or possibly Cerdic of Wessex (approximate date; suggested dates range from 490 to 517). This battle may have influenced the legend of King Arthur.
- Possible date at which Fergus Mór begins his reign – the historicity of Mór is doubtful.
- Approximate beginning of the Heptarchy period in the history of England.
- Approximate year of the founding of the Kingdom of Essex.
- Approximate year of the invention of the bee skep in Ireland.

==== Europe ====
- Burgundian Civil War: Battle of Dijon: A coalition of Franks and Burgundians crush the forces under Gundobad. King Clovis I pursues him to Avignon, where he surrenders and promises to pay a yearly tribute.
- The Frankish Kingdom is formed (approximate date).
- The monument of Ale's Stones is built in Sweden (approximate date).
- Roman catacomb burials end (approximate date).

==== Africa ====
- Thrasamund, king of the Vandals, marries Amalafrida (widowed sister of Theodoric the Great). She brings with her a large dowry and an elite Gothic force of 5,000 soldiers.
- Traders from southern Arabia settle in northern Ethiopia.

==== Asia ====
- Jijeung becomes king of the Korean kingdom of Silla.

==== Mesoamerica ====
- Tikal is founded (approximate date).
- Uxmal is founded (approximate date).

North America

- First large pit house villages at Chaco Canyon are founded (approximate date).

=== By topic ===
==== Religion ====
- The Arian Baptistry is erected by Theodoric the Great, at the same time as the Basilica of Sant' Apollinare Nuovo (Ravenna).
- The Codex Argenteus, Gothic manuscript of bishop Ulfilas's translation of the Bible, is written (approximate date).

== Births ==
- Kaleb of Axum, Aksumite king responsible for the destruction of Himyar
- Antalas, Berber tribal leader (approximate date)
- Aregund, queen of the Franks (approximate date)
- Belisarius, Byzantine general (approximate date)
- Bhavyaviveka, Indian Madhyamaka scholar (approximate date)
- Clotilde, daughter of Clovis I (approximate date)
- David, Welsh bishop (approximate date)
- Erzhu Shilong, high-official of Northern Wei (d. 532)
- Gildas, British cleric (approximate date)
- Marcouf, missionary and saint (approximate date)
- Nonnosus, abbot and saint (approximate date)
- Octa, king of Kent (approximate date)
- Procopius, Byzantine historian (approximate date)
- Paul the Black, Syriac Orthodox Patriarch of Antioch (approximate date)
- Theodora, Byzantine Empress (approximate date)
- Theudebert I, king of Austrasia (or 495)
- Tribonian, Byzantine jurist (approximate date)
- Xie He, Chinese writer and art historian (approximate date)

== Deaths ==
- March 29 – Gwynllyw, Welsh king and religious figure
- Dauí Tenga Uma, king of Connacht (Ireland)
- Zu Chongzhi, Chinese mathematician (b. 429)
