= Consort Pan (Liu Song) =

- 潘淑妃
- Death date: 16 March 453
- Cause of death: Killed by Liu Shao's soldiers during Coup d'etat
- Era: Liu Song dynasty

Consort
- Rank: Shufei
- Occupation: Concubine
- Consort: Emperor Wen
- Children: Liu Jun, Prince Shixing

Consort Pan (潘淑妃, personal name unknown) (died 16 March 453 (Note: Although Lady Pan's age was not recorded, given that she was old enough to have grandchildren, and that Liu Jun was born in 429, her birth year should be in the 410s or before.)) was an imperial consort during the Chinese Liu Song dynasty. She was Emperor Wen's concubine.

Despite her one-time prominence, little is known about Consort Pan's background. Her rank of Shufei was the fourth highest possible rank for imperial consorts at the time. She was said to have become Emperor Wen's favorite concubine because of her beauty. (Note: A story from the History of Southern Dynasties stated that Emperor Wen liked to travel on a wagon pulled by goats in the palace, and that Consort Pan then attracted the goats by sprinkling salt water on the ground outside her quarters. However, this story may be a confusion of what concubines of Emperor Wu of Jin did.) She had one son with Emperor Wen, Liu Jun the Prince of Shixing, in 429.

Because of Emperor Wen's favoritism for Consort Pan, his wife, Empress Yuan Qigui, became greatly jealous, and grew ill from the jealousy and died in September 440. (Note: Empress Yuan had first become angry at Emperor Wen when Emperor Wen approved of an expenditure for Consort Pan's relatives that was six to 10 times larger than what he had previously approved for Empress Yuan's relatives.) Because of this, Empress Yuan's son, Liu Shao the Crown Prince became very resentful of her and her son Liu Jun, particularly because after Empress Yuan's death, Consort Pan became in charge of the imperial palace, effectively replacing Empress Yuan, even though Emperor Wen never created her empress. To ward off the resentment, Liu Jun carefully flattered and ingratiated himself with Liu Shao, and the brothers became exceedingly close. Liu Shao and Liu Jun engaged a witch, Yan Daoyu (嚴道育), to try to curse Emperor Wen to death so that Liu Shao could become emperor. In 452, the plot was discovered, and Emperor Wen, angry and disappointed, rebuked Liu Shao and Liu Jun harshly, but did not initially take any actions against them. In 453, however, when he discovered that despite the rebuke, Liu Shao and Liu Jun were still associating with Yan (and Liu Jun had hidden her in his household at one point), he considered taking punitive actions against them. When she heard of this, Consort Pan held Liu Jun and wept, rebuking him and lamenting:

When your last involvement in witchcraft happened, I hoped that you would carefully reexamine your fault, but I did not expect you to hide Yan Daoyu in your household. Your father was angry beyond reason, and even though I knelt and bowed down to ask for his forgiveness, his anger would not go away. Why should I continue to live? Send me poison. I would rather commit suicide first myself than to see you suffer great disaster.

Liu Jun, however, was unappreciative of her, and he freed himself from her embrace, stating, "I must take care of all things myself. Be assured that I will not cause you trouble!"

At this time, Emperor Wen was secretly deliberating with his high-level officials Xu Danzhi (徐湛之), Jiang Dan (江湛), and Wang Sengchuo (王僧綽) as to how to punish Liu Shao and Liu Jun, and he was leaning toward deposing Liu Shao and forcing Liu Jun to commit suicide. However, he hesitated, and although he tried to keep his deliberations with Xu, Jiang, and Wang secret, he told Consort Pan, and Consort Pan immediately informed Liu Jun, who in turn informed Liu Shao. Liu Shao then started a coup d'etat and assassinated his father, taking over the throne himself. During the coup, he also had his troops enter the palace to kill Consort Pan and other close associates of Emperor Wen. When Liu Shao subsequently informed Liu Jun that Consort Pan was dead (blaming the death on unruly soldiers), Liu Jun stated, "That is in accordance with my desire. I have long wished for it." Later, after Liu Shao and Liu Jun were defeated and killed by another brother of theirs, Liu Xiulong the Prince of Wuling, who then took the throne as Emperor Xiaowu, Emperor Xiaowu posthumously awarded her the higher rank of Furen (夫人) and reburied her with honor.
