= 369 =

369 in various calendars
Gregorian calendar	369; CCCLXIX
Ab urbe condita	1122
Assyrian calendar	5119
Balinese saka calendar	290–291
Bengali calendar	−225 – −224
Berber calendar	1319
Buddhist calendar	913
Burmese calendar	−269
Byzantine calendar	5877–5878
Chinese calendar	戊辰年 (Earth Dragon); 3066 or 2859 — to — 己巳年 (Earth Snake); 3067 or 2860
Coptic calendar	85–86
Discordian calendar	1535
Ethiopian calendar	361–362
Hebrew calendar	4129–4130
- Hindu calendars
Vikram Samvat	425–426
Shaka Samvat	290–291
Kali Yuga	3469–3470
Holocene calendar	10369
Iranian calendar	253 BP – 252 BP
Islamic calendar	261 BH – 260 BH
Javanese calendar	251–252
Julian calendar	369; CCCLXIX
Korean calendar	2702
Minguo calendar	1543 before ROC 民前1543年
Nanakshahi calendar	−1099
Seleucid era	680/681 AG
Thai solar calendar	911–912
Tibetan calendar	ས་ཕོ་འབྲུག་ལོ་ (male Earth-Dragon); 495 or 114 or −658 — to — ས་མོ་སྦྲུལ་ལོ་ (female Earth-Snake); 496 or 115 or −657

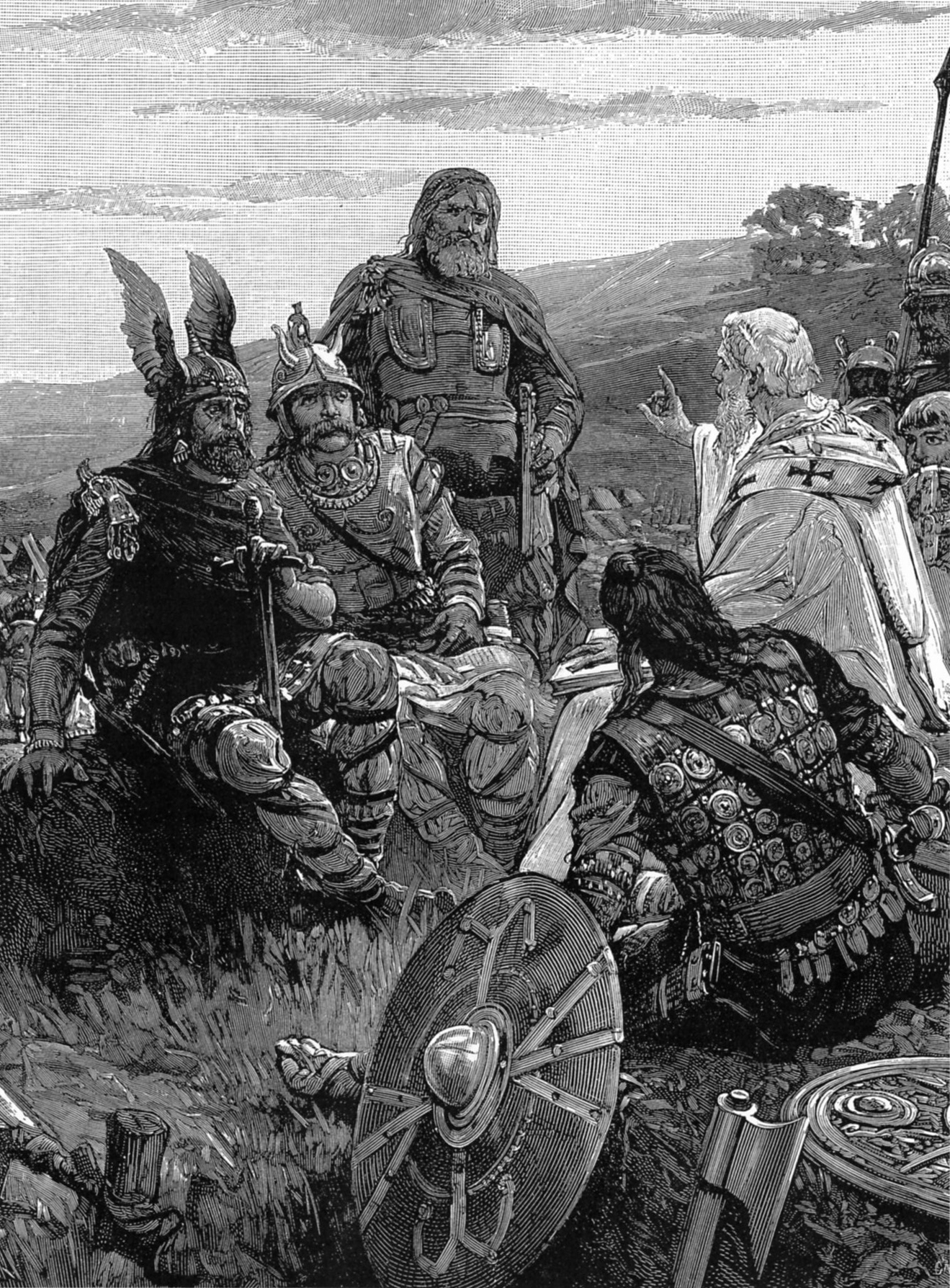
Wulfila converts the Goths to Christianity

Year 369 (CCCLXIX) was a common year starting on Thursday of the Julian calendar. At the time, it was known as the Year of the Consulship of Galates and Victor (or, less frequently, year 1122 Ab urbe condita). The denomination 369 for this year has been used since the early medieval period, when the Anno Domini calendar era became the prevalent method in Europe for naming years.

== Events ==
=== By place ===
==== Roman Empire ====
- Spring – Emperor Valens crosses the Danube, and attacks the Gothic tribes (Greuthungi and Tervingi). Valens and Athanaric, the Gothic king, eventually sign a treaty.
- Fritigern becomes king of the Visigoths; amidst hostilities with his rival Athanaric, he asks Valens and the Thracian field army to intervene. They end the civil war, and Fritigern converts to Christianity.
- Theodosius the Elder brings Britain fully back to the Empire after the Great Conspiracy of 367.

==== Persia ====
- King Shapur II occupies the pro-Roman kingdom of Armenia. He besieges Artogerassa in modern Georgia, where Papas (Pap), son of King Arsaces II (Arshak II), defends the fortress and the royal treasure against Persian forces.

==== Asia ====
- Eastern Jin general Huan Wen's third northern expedition is defeated by Former Yan general Murong Chui.
- Goguryeo invades Baekje (approximate date).

=== By topic ===
==== Art and Science ====
- Wulfila creates a Gothic alphabet composed of letters based on Greek and Roman letters, as well as some Germanic runes. He converts the Goths to Arian Christianity.

== Births ==
- Huan Xuan, Chinese warlord and emperor of the Jin Dynasty (d. 404)

== Deaths ==
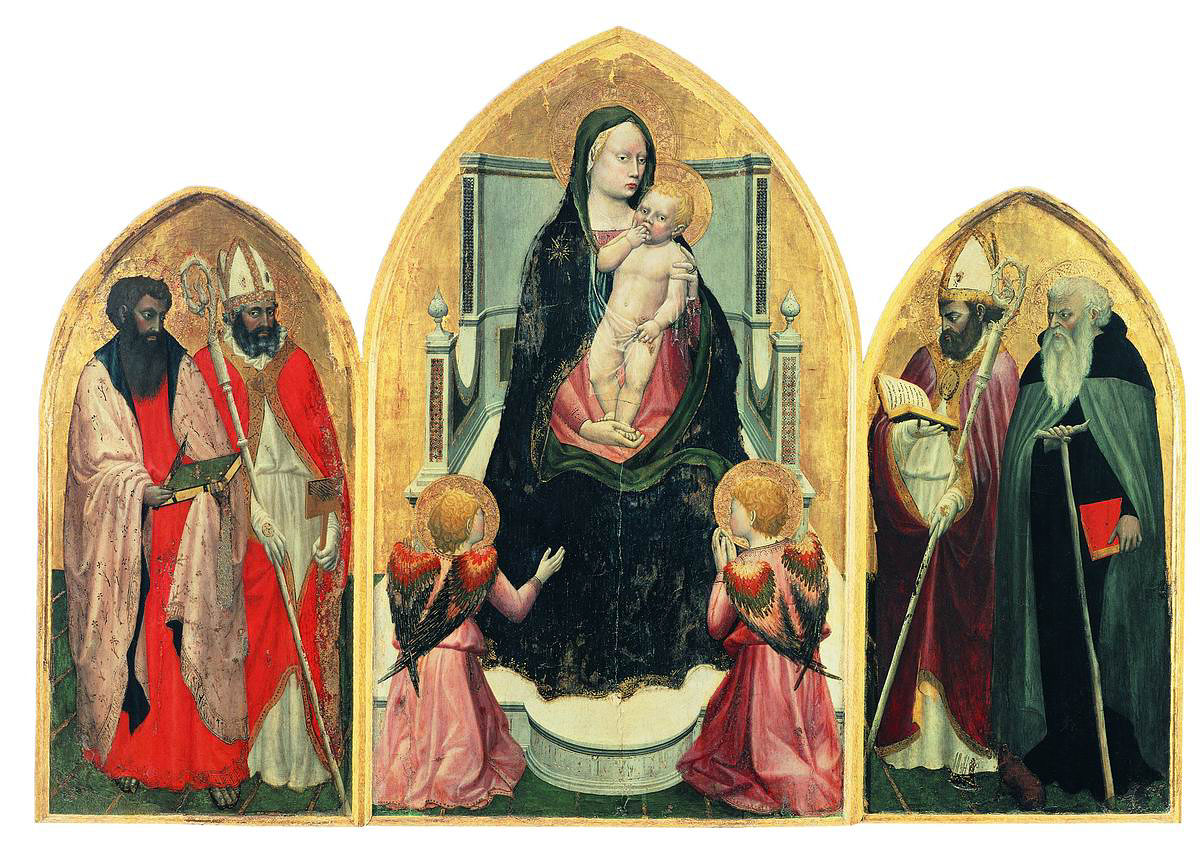
Saint Juvenal of Narni

- May 3 – Juvenal of Narni, Roman Catholic bishop, confessor and saint
- Caesarius of Nazianzus, Byzantine physician and politician (b. 331)
- Pharantzem, Armenian queen and regent (approximate date)
- Valentinus, Roman criminal and rebel leader
