= Empress Maria =

Empress Maria may refer to:

- Maria (wife of Honorius) (died 407), Roman empress by marriage to Honorius
- Maria (wife of Leo III) (died after 718), Byzantine empress consort of Leo III the Isaurian
- Maria of Alania (1053–1118), Byzantine empress by marriages to emperors Michael VII Doukas and Nikephoros III Botaneiates
- Maria of Austria, Holy Roman Empress (1528–1603), Holy Roman Empress by marriage to Maximilian II
- Maria Anna of Spain (1606–1646), Holy Roman Empress by marriage to Ferdinand III
- Maria Leopoldine of Austria (1632–1649), Holy Roman Empress by marriage to Ferdinand III
- Maria Amalia, Holy Roman Empress (1701–1756), Holy Roman Empress by marriage to Charles VII
- Maria Theresa of Austria (1717–1780), Holy Roman Empress by marriage to Francis I
- Maria Luisa of Spain (1745–1792), Holy Roman Empress by marriage to Leopold II
- Maria Feodorovna (Sophie Dorothea of Württemberg) (1759–1828), wife of Paul I of Russia
- Maria Leopoldina of Austria (1797–1826), Empress of Brazil as the wife of Pedro I
- Maria Alexandrovna (Marie of Hesse) (1824–1880), wife of Alexander II of Russia
- Maria Feodorovna (Dagmar of Denmark) (1847–1928), wife of Alexander III of Russia
