= AD 404 =

404 in various calendars
- Gregorian calendar: 404; CDIV
- Ab urbe condita: 1157
- Assyrian calendar: 5154
- Balinese saka calendar: 325–326
- Bengali calendar: −190 – −189
- Berber calendar: 1354
- Buddhist calendar: 948
- Burmese calendar: −234
- Byzantine calendar: 5912–5913
- Chinese calendar: 癸卯年 (Water Rabbit); 3101 or 2894 — to — 甲辰年 (Wood Dragon); 3102 or 2895
- Coptic calendar: 120–121
- Discordian calendar: 1570
- Ethiopian calendar: 396–397
- Hebrew calendar: 4164–4165
- Hindu calendars
- Vikram Samvat: 460–461
- Shaka Samvat: 325–326
- Kali Yuga: 3504–3505
- Holocene calendar: 10404
- Iranian calendar: 218 BP – 217 BP
- Islamic calendar: 225 BH – 224 BH
- Javanese calendar: 287–288
- Julian calendar: 404; CDIV
- Korean calendar: 2737
- Minguo calendar: 1508 before ROC 民前1508年
- Nanakshahi calendar: −1064
- Seleucid era: 715/716 AG
- Thai solar calendar: 946–947
- Tibetan calendar: ཆུ་མོ་ཡོས་ལོ་ (female Water-Hare); 530 or 149 or −623 — to — ཤིང་ཕོ་འབྲུག་ལོ་ (male Wood-Dragon); 531 or 150 or −622

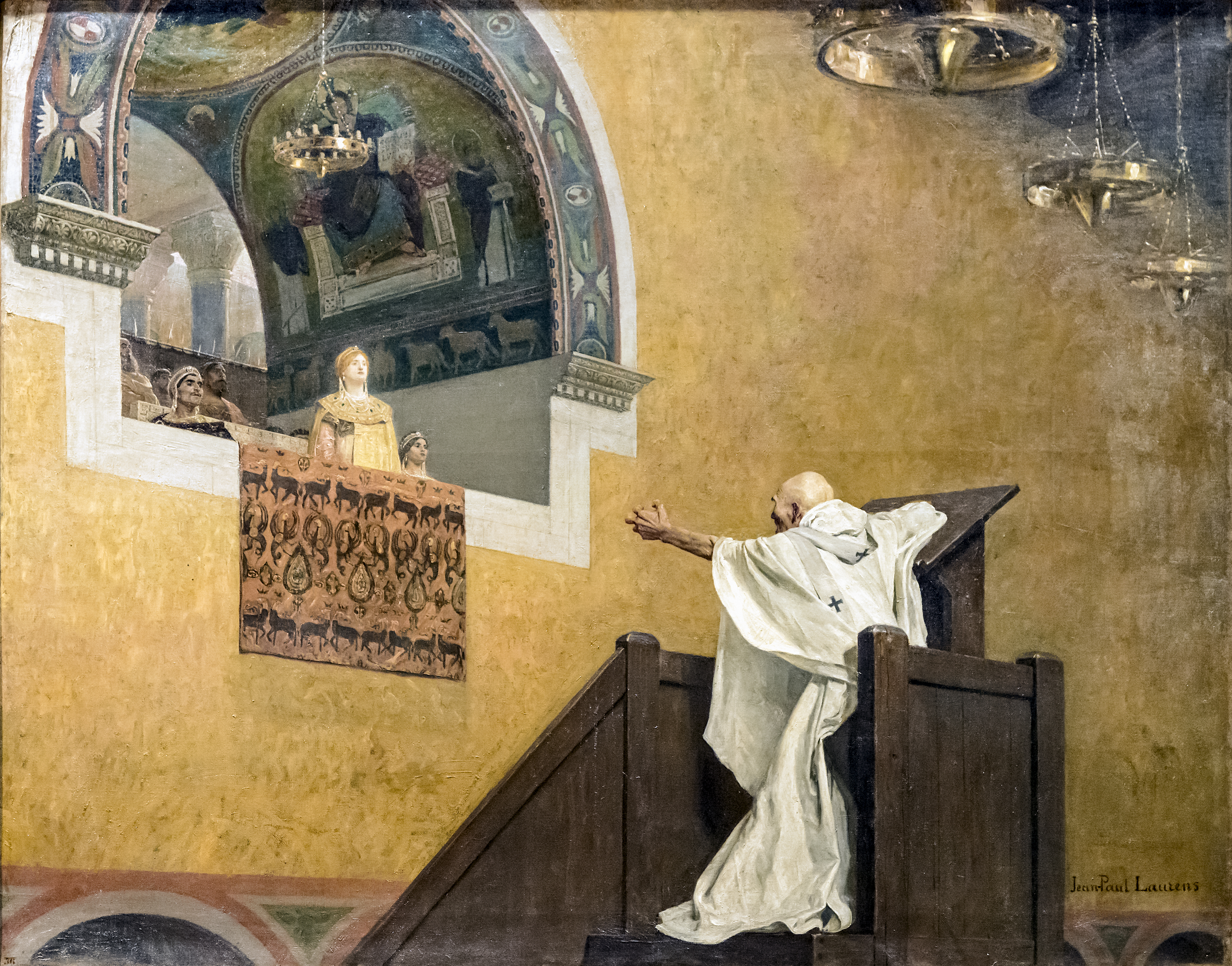
John Chrysostom confronting Empress Eudoxia, by Jean-Paul Laurens

Year 404 (CDIV) was a leap year starting on Friday of the Julian calendar. At the time, it was known as the Year of the Consulship of Honorius and Aristaenetus (or, less frequently, year 1157 Ab urbe condita). The denomination 404 for this year has been used since the early medieval period, when the Anno Domini calendar era became the prevalent method in Europe for naming years.

== Events ==
=== By place ===
==== Roman Empire ====
- January 1 – Last known gladiator fight in Rome: This date is usually given as the date of the martyrdom of Saint Telemachus, a Christian monk who was stoned by the crowd for trying to stop a gladiators' fight in a Roman amphitheatre.
- October 6 – Empress Eudoxia has her seventh and last pregnancy, which ends in a miscarriage. She is left bleeding and dies of an infection shortly after.
- Fravitta, a Goth serving the Eastern Roman Empire as a high-ranking general, is executed on the behest of a powerful official named Ioannes. Fravitta is executed because he accused Ioannes of pitting Emperor Arcadius and Emperor Honorius (of the Eastern and Western Roman Empires, respectively) against each other. The execution of Fravitta results in the Eastern Roman Empire losing one of their most loyal and competent generals. (404 or 405)

==== Asia ====
- Gwanggaeto the Great of Goguryeo (Korea) attacks Liaodong and takes the entire Liaodong Peninsula.
- The Chinese Buddhist monk Huiyuan, who founded the Pure Land Buddhism sect and the monastery on Mount Lushan, writes the book On Why Monks Do Not Bow Down Before Kings in this year. In his book he argues that although the Buddhist clergy should remain independent and undisturbed by politics, the Buddhist laymen nonetheless make good subjects under monarchs, due to their fear of retribution of karma and desire to be reborn in paradise.

=== By topic ===
==== Religion ====
- Eudoxia exiles John Chrysostom, bishop of Constantinople, for criticizing her sumptuous lifestyle. He is banished to the Caucasus in Armenia. Pope Innocent I at Rome orders a synod to reinstate the bishop, but his envoys are imprisoned. Atticus becomes the new bishop of Constantinople.

== Deaths ==
- January 1 – Telemachus, Christian monk and martyr
- February – Flavian I, Patriarch of Antioch
- June 19 – Huan Xuan, warlord and emperor of the Jin Dynasty (b. 369)
- October 6 – Aelia Eudoxia, Roman Empress and wife of Arcadius
- Claudian, Roman poet (approximate date)
- He Fani, empress of the Jin dynasty (b. 339)
- Paula, Desert Mother and saint (b. 347)
