= 347 =

347 in various calendars
- Gregorian calendar: 347; CCCXLVII
- Ab urbe condita: 1100
- Assyrian calendar: 5097
- Balinese saka calendar: 268–269
- Bengali calendar: −247 – −246
- Berber calendar: 1297
- Buddhist calendar: 891
- Burmese calendar: −291
- Byzantine calendar: 5855–5856
- Chinese calendar: 丙午年 (Fire Horse); 3044 or 2837 — to — 丁未年 (Fire Goat); 3045 or 2838
- Coptic calendar: 63–64
- Discordian calendar: 1513
- Ethiopian calendar: 339–340
- Hebrew calendar: 4107–4108
- Hindu calendars
- Vikram Samvat: 403–404
- Shaka Samvat: 268–269
- Kali Yuga: 3447–3448
- Holocene calendar: 10347
- Iranian calendar: 275 BP – 274 BP
- Islamic calendar: 283 BH – 282 BH
- Javanese calendar: 228–229
- Julian calendar: 347; CCCXLVII
- Korean calendar: 2680
- Minguo calendar: 1565 before ROC 民前1565年
- Nanakshahi calendar: −1121
- Seleucid era: 658/659 AG
- Thai solar calendar: 889–890
- Tibetan calendar: མེ་ཕོ་རྟ་ལོ་ (male Fire-Horse); 473 or 92 or −680 — to — མེ་མོ་ལུག་ལོ་ (female Fire-Sheep); 474 or 93 or −679

Year 347 (CCCXLVII) was a common year starting on Thursday of the Julian calendar. At the time, it was known as the Year of the Consulship of Rufinus and Eusebius (or, less frequently, year 1100 Ab urbe condita). The denomination 347 for this year has been used since the early medieval period, when the Anno Domini calendar era became the prevalent method in Europe for naming years.

== Events ==
=== By place ===
==== China ====
- Li Shi, ruler of Cheng Han, fails in his attempt to halt a Jin expedition under Huan Wen. He flees to the capital Chengdu and surrenders his forces. Emperor Jin Mudi spares his life and makes him a marquess.

=== By topic ===
==== Religion ====
- Council of Sardica: An attempt is made to resolve the Arian controversy, and ground rules for bishops are laid down.
- The Council of Philippopolis is held as the result of Eastern bishops leaving the Council of Sardica. In Philippopolis (Bulgaria), they excommunicate Pope Julius, and as a result, the Arian controversy is perpetuated.

== Births ==
- January 11 – Theodosius I, Roman Emperor (d. 395)
- March 27 – Saint Jerome, priest and translator of the Bible (approximate date)
- Eunapius, Greek sophist and historian
- John Chrysostom, archbishop of Constantinople (approximate date)
- Paula, Desert Mother and Saint (d. 404)
- Saint Porphyry, bishop of Gaza (approximate date)

== Deaths ==
- Ursicinus of Brescia, Bishop of Brescia
