= Liu Jun, Prince Shixing =

Chinese Liu Song dynasty prince (429–453)

Liu Jun (劉濬) (429 – 27 May 453), courtesy name Xiuming (休明), nickname Hutou (虎頭), was an imperial prince of the Chinese Liu Song dynasty. He was a son of Emperor Wen, who in 453 conspired with his older brother Liu Shao the Crown Prince to assassinate their father so that Liu Shao could become emperor. They were subsequently defeated by their brother Liu Jun (courtesy name "Xiulong") the Prince of Wuling and executed. Liu Jun's sons, daughters, and concubines were also executed. Only his Princess Chu, because he had divorced her immediately prior to his capture, was spared.

== Background ==
Liu Jun was born in 429, as Emperor Wen's second son. His mother was Emperor Wen's favorite concubine, Consort Pan. In 436, at the age of eight (by East Asian reckoning), he was created the Prince of Shixing (始興王). Starting in 439, he became a provincial governor, being rotated to various provinces, although his chiefs of staff were actually in charge of administering the provincial matters due to his youth. As he grew older, he became more and more actually involved in the duties of provincial governorships. He was considered an avid reader and careful in cultivating his appearance.

In September 440, Emperor Wen's wife Empress Yuan Qigui, who had become ill after becoming envious and angry over the favor that Emperor Wen had shown Consort Pan, died. After that point, Consort Pan, despite not being made empress, was effectively the mistress of the palace. Because of this, Empress Yuan's son Liu Shao the crown prince became resentful of both Consort Pan and Liu Jun. Sensing this, Liu Jun carefully flattered and served his older brother, and the brothers became exceedingly close.

== Coup against Emperor Wen ==
Some time prior to 452, Liu Shao and Liu Jun the Prince of Shixing had become acquainted with the witch Yan Daoyu (嚴道育), whose magical abilities their sister Liu Ying'e (劉英娥) the Princess Dongyang had believed greatly. Because Emperor Wen was strict with his sons, he often rebuked Liu Shao and Liu Jun for errors in their behavior. Initially, Liu Shao and Liu Jun requested that Yan use magical powers to plead to the gods and ghosts so that Emperor Wen would not hear their faults. Later, Liu Shao and Liu Jun began to have Yan curse Emperor Wen to hasten his death, so that Liu Shao could become emperor. By this point, the brothers had become so resentful of their father Emperor Wen that when they corresponded with each other, they referred to their father derogatorily as "that person", and referred to their uncle Liu Yigong the Prince of Jiangxia, who was the prime minister by this point, "flatterer."

In 452, however, news of Yan Daoyu's witchcraft leaked. Liu Ying'e's servant girl Wang Yingwu (王鸚鵡), who had served as liaison between Liu Shao, Liu Jun, and Yan, had previously carried on an affair with Liu Ying'e's servant Chen Tianyu (陳天與), who was involved in the witchcraft as well, before becoming a concubine of Liu Jun's assistant Shen Huaiyuan (沈懷遠). Apprehensive that Shen would find out her prior sexual relationship with Chen, she persuaded Liu Shao to have Chen put to death. Another servant, Chen Qingguo (陳慶國), also involved in the witchcraft, became frightened that he would be killed as well, and therefore reported the plot to Emperor Wen. Emperor Wen arrested Wang Yingwu and found correspondences from Liu Shao and Liu Jun regarding the witchcraft, and further found dolls used in the witchcraft; he then tried to arrest Yan as well, but Yan was nowhere to be found. However, Emperor Wen did not have the heart to punish Liu Shao and Liu Jun, but merely rebuked them.

By spring 453, Yan was hiding under Liu Jun's protection, at Liu Jun's post at Jingkou (京口, in modern Zhenjiang, Jiangsu), living in the house of Liu Jun's servant Zhang Wu (張旿). Liu Jun was then to next become the governor of Jing Province (荊州, modern Hubei) with his post at Jiangling, and he brought Yan back to the capital Jiankang. At this time, however, Emperor Wen had received reports that Yan was living at Zhang's house, and he had the house searched—and while Yan was not found there (since she had returned to Jiankang with Liu Jun), he was told that Yan was in Jiankang with Liu Jun. Emperor Wen became exceedingly angry, believing that Liu Jun and Liu Shao were still involved with witchcraft. He therefore considered deposing Liu Shao and forcing Liu Jun to commit suicide. He secretly and intensely discussed the matter with Xu Danzhi, Jiang Dan, and Wang Sengchuo (王僧綽). The discussion became bogged down over who would replace Liu Shao as crown prince—with Jiang supporting his brother-in-law Liu Shuo the Prince of Nanping and Xu supporting his son-in-law Liu Dan (劉誕) the Prince of Sui, and despite Wang's urging that the matter proceed quickly, Emperor Wen hesitated between Liu Shuo and Liu Hong (劉宏) the prince of Jianping. Meanwhile, despite the secrecy of the discussions, Emperor Wen told Consort Pan about the discussions, and she quickly informed Liu Jun, who then informed Liu Shao. Liu Shao therefore planned a coup against his father.

Despite the opposition of Liu Shao's associate Yuan Shu (袁淑), the other associates supported Liu Shao's plan, and it proceeded. Liu Shao, after forging an edict from Emperor Wen stating that his troops were to enter the palace to help guard against a rebellion, took over the defense of the palace, and he sent his guard Zhang Chaozhi (張超之) into Emperor Wen's bedchamber to assassinate him. Liu Shao also had Xu, Jiang, Consort Pan, and a number of other associates of Emperor Wen put to death. Liu Jun soon joined him at the palace, and the brothers then falsely announced that Emperor Wen had been killed by Xu and Jiang. Liu Shao then took the throne.

During the coup, Liu Jun was initially outside the city. When news of the coup came, his staff members, not knowing that Liu Jun was involved as well, suggested that he occupy Shitou, a fortress west of the city, and observe what the situation was. Liu Jun, unsure whether Liu Shao had succeeded, agreed. Later, however, when he got to Shitou, Liu Shao sent Zhang Chaozhi to meet him and explain what the situation was, and Liu Jun left Shitou to join Liu Shao in the palace, despite opposition of his staff, and openly showed his support for Liu Shao. When Liu Shao told him that Consort Pan had been killed, he even stated, "That is in accordance with my desire. I have long wished for it."

== During Liu Shao's brief reign ==
Most of the imperial princes and provincial governors quickly rose against Liu Shao, supporting Liu Xiulong the Prince of Wuling as their leader, and he, while the war was still ongoing, took the throne as Emperor Xiaowu. Liu Shao made Liu Jun the Prince of Shixing his prime minister, and they faced the rebellion together. Liu Shao also made Liu Jun's father-in-law Chu Danzhi (褚湛之) a key official, although Chu later defected to the rebels. (In response to this, Liu Jun divorced his wife Princess Chu.) Later, after Liu Shao's forces had largely been defeated by Emperor Xiaowu's, Liu Jun suggested to Liu Shao that they flee to East China Sea together, but Liu Shao declined. Soon, the palace fell, and Liu Shao was captured. Liu Jun tried to flee with his associates, after taking another brother, Liu Shuo (劉鑠) the Prince of Nanping, as a hostage, but on the way they encountered their uncle Liu Yigong, who had previously joined the rebellion. Liu Jun decided to beg Liu Yigong to intercede on his behalf, and Liu Yigong took Liu Jun with him, but on the way to Emperor Xiaowu's camp, Liu Yigong beheaded Liu Jun and his three sons, Liu Zhangwen (劉長文), Liu Zhangren (劉長仁), and Liu Zhangdao (劉長道). Liu Jun's concubines and daughters were forced to commit suicide. Only Princess Chu was spared, because Liu Jun had publicly divorced her.
