= Yuan Qigui =

Yuan Qigui 袁齊媯

Empress consort of Liu Song
- Tenure: 26 October 424 – 8 September 440
- Predecessor: Empress Sima Maoying
- Successor: Empress Wang Xianyuan
- Born: 405
- Died: 8 September 440 (aged 34–35); Jiankang, Liu Song
- Spouse: Emperor Wen of Song
- Issue: Liu Shao; Princess Dongyangxian
Posthumous name
- Empress Yuan (元皇后)
- Father: Yuan Dan
- Mother: Lady Wang

Yuan Qigui (Chinese: 袁齊媯; 405 – 8 September 440), formally Empress Yuan (元皇后, literally "the discerning empress") was an empress of the Chinese Liu Song dynasty. Her husband was Emperor Wen (Liu Yilong).

== Life ==
Yuan Qigui was a daughter of the official Yuan Dan (袁湛) and his concubine, Lady Wang, but her mother was of such low status that Yuan Dan did not let others know of Yuan Qigui's existence until she was four or five. She married Liu Yilong when he was still the Prince of Yidu. The couple had two children, his oldest son Liu Shao and a daughter, Liu Ying'e (劉英娥), later the Princess Dongyang. After key imperial officials concluded that his brother Emperor Shao was unfit to be emperor, they deposed and killed Emperor Shao in 424 and offered the throne to Liu Yilong. Liu Yilong accepted and took the throne as Emperor Wen. Later that year, on 26 October, he created her empress.

It was around this time, either right before or right after Emperor Wen became emperor, that Empress Yuan gave birth to his son Liu Shao. According to traditional histories, when she observed her son's face, she remarked that this child would bring disaster on the house and was ready to kill her child. Emperor Wen, hearing this, rushed to her bedchambers and forced her to spare the child. Some later historians, including Bo Yang, doubted this account. However, because he was still within the three-year mourning period for his father Emperor Wu and supposed to abstain from sexual relations, he hid Liu Shao's birth from the public and only announced it in 426.

Emperor Wen initially favored Empress Yuan greatly. Because the Yuan clan was a poor one, she often requested him to give her money so that she could give them to her clan. Emperor Wen, who was known to be thrifty, refused to give her much. Later on, he began to favor Consort Pan more than her. In order to test Emperor Wen's affection for her, Empress Yuan asked Consort Pan to request an amount of money six to 10 times greater than what Emperor Wen had been giving her. Emperor Wen approved Consort Pan's request; from this point on, Empress Yuan was filled with anger. Whenever Emperor Wen wished to see her, she would try to hide from him, and she also refused to see her stepchildren. She grew ill in her anger, and in 440 she grew very ill. Emperor Wen went to her chambers to see her and, crying, held her hands to ask what request she had. She looked at him for a long time and then, without saying anything, covered her face with a blanket and refused to look at him again. She soon died. Emperor Wen mourned her greatly and had the talented writer Yan Yanzhi (顏延之) write a beautiful ode dedicated to her.

== Title ==
- During the reign of Emperor An of Jin (7 November 397 – 28 January 419)
  - Lady Yuan (袁氏; from 405)
- During the reign of Emperor Wu of Song (10 July 420 – 26 June 422)
  - Princess Consort of Yidu (宜都王妃)
- During the reign of Emperor Wen of Song (17 September 424 – 16 March 453)
  - Empress (皇后; from 17 September 424)
  - Empress Wenyuan (文元皇后; from 440)

== Issue ==
As Princess Consort:

- Liu Shao, Emperor (皇帝 劉劭; 424–453), Emperor Wen's first son
- Princess Dongyangxian (東陽獻公主)

Chinese royalty
Preceded by Empress Sima Maoying	Empress of Liu Song; 424–440	Succeeded by Empress Yin Yuying
