= Liu Shao (Liu Song) =

Liu Shao 劉劭

Emperor of Liu Song
- Reign: 16 March - 27 May 453
- Predecessor: Emperor Wen
- Successor: Emperor Xiaowu
- Born: 424
- Died: 27 May 453 (aged 29)
- Consorts: Empress Yin Yuying of Chen
- Issue: Liu Weizhi; Liu Dizhi; Liu Binzhi
Names
- Family name: Liú (劉); Given name: Shao (劭); Courtesy name: Xiuyuan (休遠)
Era name and dates
- Tàichū (太初): 453
- Father: Emperor Wen
- Mother: Empress Wenyuan

Liu Shao (Chinese: 劉劭; 424 - 27 May 453), courtesy name Xiuyuan (休遠), later known as Yuanxiong (元凶, meaning "prime murderer"), was briefly the fourth emperor of the Liu Song dynasty of China. He was Emperor Wen's crown prince who, after hearing that his father was going to depose him, staged a coup d'état and assassinated his father, taking over the throne, but was then defeated and killed by his brother Liu Jun, the Prince of Wuling, who took the throne.

== As crown prince ==
Liu Shao's official birth date was 28 February 426, when his father Emperor Wen (Liu Yilong) was already the emperor of Liu Song. However, official histories (Note: specifically, Liu Shao's biography in Book of Song) state that that was not his actual birth date—that he was born to his father and his mother Empress Yuan Qigui, while Liu Yilong was still the Prince of Yidu under Liu Yilong's older brother Emperor Shao. The reason why the birth date was falsified, the official accounts indicate, was because Liu Shao was conceived during the three-year period that Liu Yilong should have observed for his father Emperor Wu, during which he was supposed to abstain from sexual relations. He was Emperor Wen's oldest son.

The official accounts also contain another story about Liu Shao's birth (Note: found in his mother Yuan Qigui's biographies in Book of Song and History of the Southern Dynasties)—that when he was born, Empress Yuan looked at him, and then stated, "This child's appearance is unusual, and he will surely destroy his state and his home; I will not raise him." She then wanted to put the child to death, but when Emperor Wen heard this, he ran to her bedchambers and saved the child. (Note: Modern historian Bo Yang doubted this account and believed that this story was invented after Liu Shao's deeds.)

On 14 May 429, Emperor Wen created Liu Shao crown prince. In 438, he took the daughter of his deceased official Yin Chun (殷淳), Yin Yuying, as Crown Prince Shao's crown princess. Around the new year 440, Crown Prince Shao assumed adult clothing, signifying adulthood. At this point, he was described as handsome and studious, and he also was good at archery and horsemanship. He liked having many guests in his household, and Emperor Wen granted whatever wish he wanted. Around this time, Liu Shao also started to maintain a large guard corps for the crown prince's palace.

Liu Shao's mother Empress Yuan was initially Emperor Wen's favorite. However, as years went by, she began to lose favor to Consort Pan. Once, in order to test Emperor Wen, she had Consort Pan request an expenditure for her relatives that was six to 10 times larger than what he had previously approved for Empress Yuan's relatives—and Emperor Wen approved it readily. From that point, she became resentful of Emperor Wen, and she grew ill with jealousy, but even in her illness she refused to reconcile with Emperor Wen. In 440, she died, and thereafter Liu Shao resented Consort Pan and her son Liu Jun the Prince of Shixing. Liu Jun, knowing this, carefully flattered and cultivated his relationship with Liu Shao, and the brothers became exceedingly close.

In 450, when Emperor Wen wanted to attack Northern Wei to recover the provinces south of the Yellow River lost during the reign of Emperor Shao (which Emperor Wen temporarily recovered in 430 but lost again in 431), Liu Shao, along with the generals Shen Qingzhi (沈慶之) and Xiao Sihua (蕭思話), opposed the campaign, but they were not listened to. When Emperor Taiwu of Northern Wei counterattacked late in the year and deeply advanced into Liu Song territory, reaching Guabu (瓜部, in modern Nanjing, Jiangsu), just across the Yangtze River from the Liu Song capital Jiankang. At this time, however, Emperor Taiwu proposed that the enemies make peace by entering into marital relationships—have one of Emperor Wen's daughters marry one of his grandsons, and have one of his daughters marry Liu Shao's younger brothers, Liu Jun the Prince of Wuling (different character than the Prince of Shixing). Liu Shao was in favor of the plan—reasoning that at that time his brothers Liu Jun and Liu Shuo (劉鑠) the Prince of Nanping, as well as his uncle Liu Yigong (劉義恭) the Prince of Jiangxia, were trapped in besieged cities behind the enemy lines—but the high-level official Jiang Dan (江湛) opposed—causing Liu Shao to be so angry that after the imperial council meeting, Liu Shao had the guards push Jiang down the stairs, almost killing Jiang. He also suggested to Emperor Wen that Jiang and another high-level official, his cousin Xu Danzhi (徐湛之, the son of Emperor Wen's sister Liu Xingdi (劉興弟) the Princess Kuaiji), should be put to death for having supported the campaign. Emperor Wen refused, stating that it was his own wishes that the campaign was launched, and that Xu and Jiang had merely not opposed it. From this point on, a deep enmity developed between Liu Shao and Jiang and Xu. As a result, Jiang and Xu further vigorously opposed the marriage treaty proposal, and it was never carried out.

In 451, Liu Shao had a hand in an uncle's death—that of Liu Yikang the former prime minister and Prince of Pengcheng. Because Liu Yikang had been the center of many conspiracies (which he did not appear personally involved) to overthrow Emperor Wen and replace Emperor Wen with him, Emperor Wen had exiled Liu Yikang. With Northern Wei forces still deeply in Liu Song territory, Emperor Wen was concerned that conspirators might yet try again, and Liu Shao, along with Liu Jun the Prince of Wuling and He Shangzhi (何尚之) advocated putting Liu Yikang to death. Emperor Wen therefore sent messengers to order Liu Yikang to commit suicide, and when he refused, he was suffocated.

== Coup against Emperor Wen ==
Some time prior to 452, Liu Shao and Liu Jun the Prince of Shixing had become acquainted with the witch Yan Daoyu (嚴道育), whose magical abilities their sister Liu Ying'e (劉英娥) the Princess Dongyang had believed greatly. Because Emperor Wen was strict with his sons, he often rebuked Liu Shao and Liu Jun for errors in their behavior. Initially, Liu Shao and Liu Jun requested that Yan use magical powers to plead to the gods and ghosts so that Emperor Wen would not hear their faults. Later, Liu Shao and Liu Jun began to have Yan curse Emperor Wen to hasten his death, so that Liu Shao could become emperor. By this point, the brothers had become so resentful of their father Emperor Wen that when they corresponded with each other, they referred to their father derogatorily as "that person", and referred to their uncle Liu Yigong the Prince of Jiangxia, who was the prime minister by this point, "flatterer."

In 452, however, news of Yan Daoyu's witchcraft leaked. Liu Ying'e's servant girl Wang Yingwu (王鸚鵡), who had served as liaison between Liu Shao, Liu Jun, and Yan, had previously carried on an affair with Liu Ying'e's servant Chen Tianyu (陳天與), who was involved in the witchcraft as well, before becoming a concubine of Liu Jun's assistant Shen Huaiyuan (沈懷遠). Apprehensive that Shen would find out her prior sexual relationship with Chen, she persuaded Liu Shao to have Chen put to death. Another servant, Chen Qingguo (陳慶國), also involved in the witchcraft, became frightened that he would be killed as well, and therefore reported the plot to Emperor Wen. Emperor Wen arrested Wang Yingwu and found correspondences from Liu Shao and Liu Jun regarding the witchcraft, and further found dolls used in the witchcraft; he then tried to arrest Yan as well, but Yan was nowhere to be found. However, Emperor Wen did not have the heart to punish Liu Shao and Liu Jun, but merely rebuked them.

By spring 453, Yan was hiding under Liu Jun's protection, at Liu Jun's post at Jingkou (京口, in modern Zhenjiang, Jiangsu), living in the house of Liu Jun's servant Zhang Wu (張旿). Liu Jun was then to next become the governor of Jing Province (荊州, modern Hubei) with his post at Jiangling, and he brought Yan back to the capital Jiankang. At this time, however, Emperor Wen had received reports that Yan was living at Zhang's house, and he had the house searched—and while Yan was not found there (since she had returned to Jiankang with Liu Jun), he was told that Yan was in Jiankang with Liu Jun. Emperor Wen became exceedingly angry, believing that Liu Jun and Liu Shao were still involved with witchcraft. He therefore considered deposing Liu Shao and forcing Liu Jun to commit suicide. He secretly and intensely discussed the matter with Xu Danzhi, Jiang Dan, and Wang Sengchuo (王僧綽). The discussion became bogged down over who would replace Liu Shao as crown prince—with Jiang supporting his brother-in-law Liu Shuo the Prince of Nanping and Xu supporting his son-in-law Liu Dan (劉誕) the Prince of Sui, and despite Wang's urging that the matter proceed quickly, Emperor Wen hesitated between Liu Shuo and Liu Hong (劉宏) the prince of Jianping. Meanwhile, despite the secrecy of the discussions, Emperor Wen told Consort Pan about the discussions, and she quickly informed Liu Jun, who then informed Liu Shao. Liu Shao therefore planned a coup against his father.

Despite the opposition of Liu Shao's associate Yuan Shu (袁淑), the other associates supported Liu Shao's plan, and it proceeded. Liu Shao, after forging an edict from Emperor Wen stating that his troops were to enter the palace to help guard against a rebellion, took over the defense of the palace, and he sent his guard Zhang Chaozhi (張超之) into Emperor Wen's bedchamber to assassinate him. Liu Shao also had Xu, Jiang, Consort Pan, and a number of other associates of Emperor Wen put to death. Liu Jun soon joined him at the palace, and the brothers then falsely announced that Emperor Wen had been killed by Xu and Jiang. Liu Shao then took the throne.

== Brief reign ==
Despite Liu Shao's false accusations against the now-dead Xu and Jiang, it soon became clear that it was he himself who had assassinated Emperor Wen. Therefore, while the imperial officials, fearful of him, largely submitted to him, most of them were not truly loyal to him. He had a number of cousins that he disliked put to death.

Liu Shao then issued a secret edict to Shen Qingzhi, ordering him to put Liu Jun the Prince of Wuling, who was then the governor of Jiang Province (江州, modern Jiangxi and Fujian), to death. Shen, instead, showed the edict to Liu Jun and advocated that he start a rebellion to overthrow Liu Shao. Liu Jun agreed, and was soon joined in his uprising by his uncle Liu Yixuan (劉義宣) the Prince of Nanqiao (Note: then governor of Jing Province), Zang Zhi (臧質), (Note: then governor of Yong Province (雍州), in present-day northwestern Hubei and southwestern Henan) and brother Liu Dan, Prince of Sui (Note: then governor of Kuaiji Commandery along the southern shore of Hangzhou Bay), who further advocated that he take the throne. Hearing that all these governors were against him, Liu Shao became apprehensive, and he put Jiankang under martial law, further putting his brothers and cousins who were in Jiankang under house arrest. Meanwhile, he created his wife Crown Princess Ying empress and his son Liu Weizhi (劉偉之) crown prince.

Liu Shao, with good reasons, suspected that his father's officials would not be loyal to him, so he tried to befriend the generals Lu Xiu (魯秀) and Wang Luohan (王羅漢), entrusting them with military matters, while using his long-time associate Xiao Bin (蕭斌) as chief strategist and Empress Yin's uncle Yin Chong (殷沖) as chief propagandist. Xiao suggested that Liu Shao personally lead his fleet in battle against Liu Jun, whose fleet was smaller and unsuitable for a battle on the Yangtze River, or to defend the gorge at Liang Mountain (梁山, in modern Chaohu, Anhui). However, secretly supporting Liu Jun, Liu Yigong suggested that Liu Shao remain at Jiankang and defend the city against Liu Jun's forces, using Qinhuai River (a small river that flowed south of modern city of Nanjing into the Yangtze) as the defense—a strategy that played into Liu Jun's strength of being able to use his army generals effectively on land. Liu Jun was therefore able to reach Jiankang quickly. Initially, Liu Shao's general Zhan Shu'er (詹叔兒) suggested that he attack Liu Jun's general Liu Yuanjing (柳元景) quickly, but Liu Shao failed to do so, but only attacked after Liu Yuanjing's camp was already secure. Initially, however, his forces, under the commands of Xiao, Liu Jun the Prince of Shixing's father-in-law Chu Danzhi (褚湛之), Lu, and Wang, made advances against Liu Yuanjing's forces. However, Lu then sabotaged the battle plans by sounding a general retreat, and Liu Yuanjing routed Liu Shao's forces. Lu and Chu then took the opportunity to surrender. Liu Yigong also soon fled to Liu Jun's forces, and in anger, Liu Shao had Liu Yigong's 12 sons put to death. Apprehensive of the situation in faced, Liu Shao could not think of other things to do but to sacrifice to two gods, commissioning them with great honors.

Five days later, Liu Jun himself arrived near Jiankang, and the next day, he took the throne as Emperor Xiaowu, while the battles continued. Soon, Lu, now a Liu Jun general, crossed the Qinhuai River, and Liu Shao's forces collapsed. Liu Jun's forces put the palace under siege, and Liu Jun the Prince of Shixing tried to persuade Liu Shao they could flee to East China Sea together, but Liu Shao declined. Soon, the palace fell, and Liu Shao hid in a well but was found and captured. Liu Jun had him publicly beheaded with his four sons. His wife Empress Yin, his concubines, and any daughters he might have had were forced to commit suicide. Liu Jun also ordered that Liu Shao be posthumously known as Yuanxiong (元凶), meaning "prime murderer."

== Family ==
- Empress, of the Yin clan of Chen (皇后 陳郡殷氏; d. 453), personal name Yuying (玉英)
  - Liu Weizhi, Crown Prince (皇太子 劉偉之; d. 453), first son
- Wang Yingwu (王鸚鵡) d. 453
- Unknown
  - Liu Dizhi (劉迪之; d. 453), second son
  - Liu Binzhi (劉彬之; d. 453), third son
  - Fourth son (d. 453)
  - A daughter (d. 453)

== Notes ==
Regnal titles
Preceded by Emperor Wen of Song	Emperor of Liu Song; 453	Succeeded by Emperor Xiaowu of Song
