= Saint Telemachus =

4th-century Christian monk, saint, and martyr

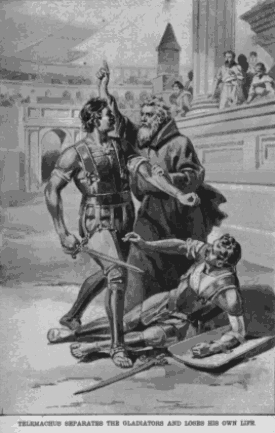
- The Martyrdom of Saint Telemachus

Hermit and Martyr
- Born: Asia Minor, Eastern Roman Empire
- Died: 1 January 404 (or 391); Rome, Western Roman Empire
- Cause of death: Execution by stoning
- Venerated in: Anglicanism; Orthodox Church; Catholic Church
- Feast: 1 January

Saint Telemachus (also Almachus or Almachius; Greek: Τηλέμαχος) was a monk who, according to the Church historian Theodoret, tried to stop a gladiatorial fight in a Roman amphitheatre, and was stoned to death by the crowd. The Christian Emperor Honorius, however, was impressed by the monk's martyrdom and it spurred him to issue a historic ban on gladiatorial fights. Frederick George Holweck gives the year of his death as 391.

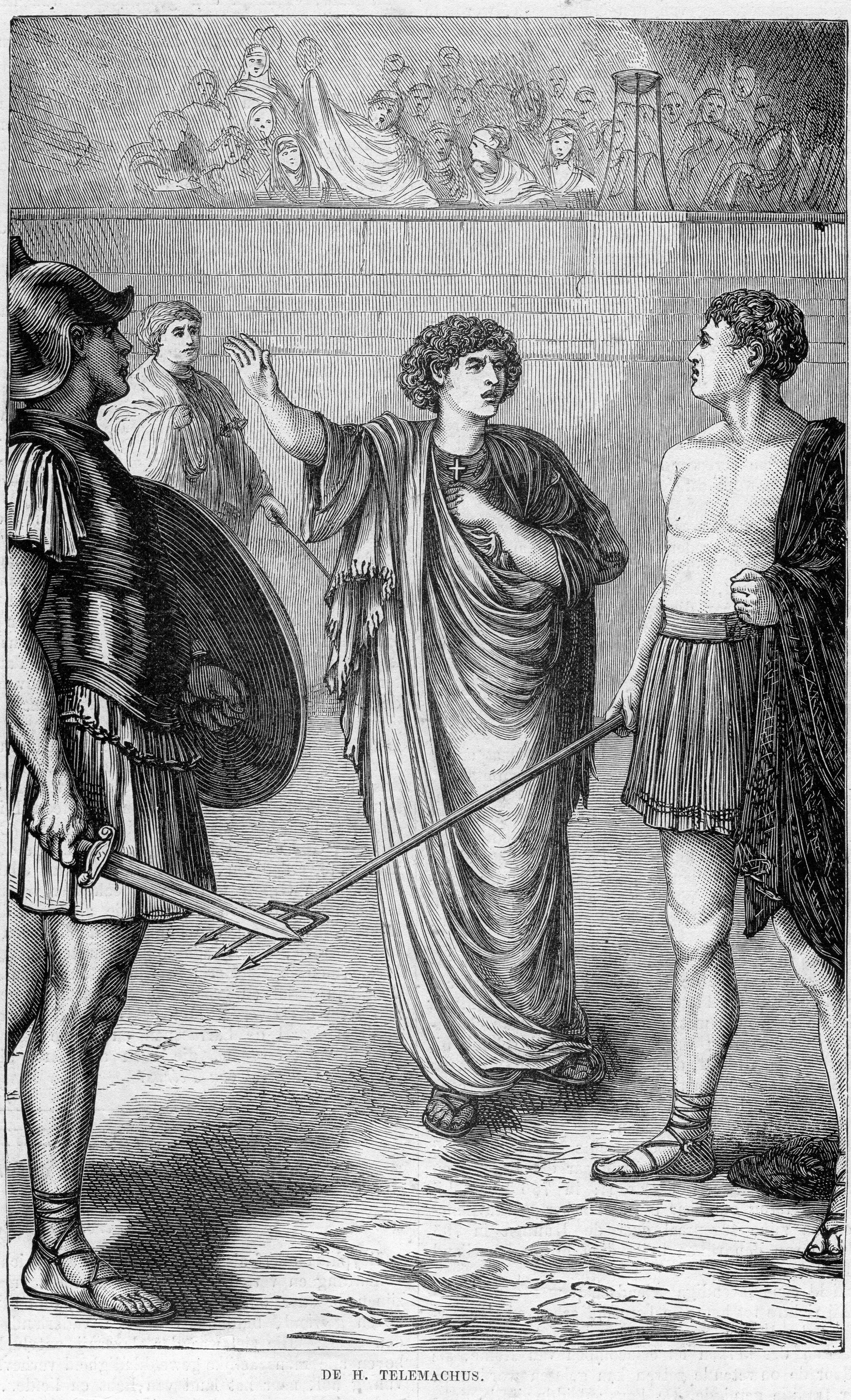
Telemachus at the stadium

== Sources ==
He is described as being an ascetic who came to Rome from the East. The story is found in the writings of Theodoret, Bishop of Cyrrhus, Syria.

Although the site of Telemachus' martyrdom is often given as being the Colosseum in Rome, Theodoret does not actually specify where it happened, saying merely that it happened in "the stadium".

Theodoret's account was abridged into the Historiae Ecclesiasticae Tripartitae Epitome of Cassiodorus.

Later retellings of the story have differed from Theodoret's in a number of details. Foxe's Book of Martyrs claims that Telemachus was first stabbed to death by a gladiator, but that the sight of his death "turned the hearts of the people".

There is also an alternative form of the story, in which Telemachus stood up in the amphitheatre and told the assembly to stop worshipping idols and offering sacrifices to the gods. Upon hearing this statement, the prefect of the city is said by this source to have ordered the gladiators to kill Telemachus, and they promptly did so.
