= Emperor Wen of Song =

Emperor Wen of Song 宋文帝
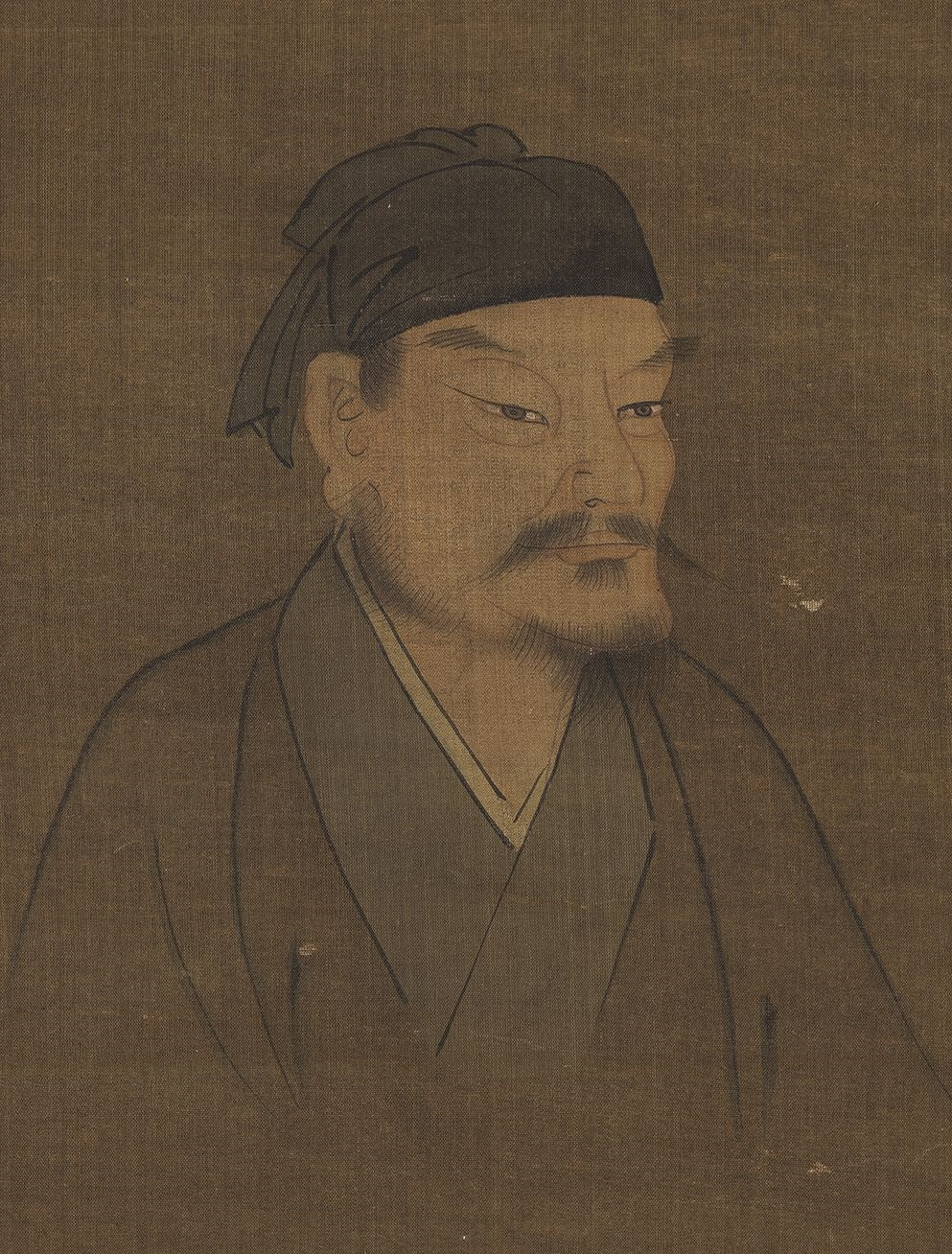

Emperor of the Liu Song Dynasty
- Reign: 17 September 424 – 16 March 453
- Predecessor: Liu Yifu
- Successor: Liu Shao
- Born: Liu Che'er (劉車兒); 407; Jingkou, Eastern Jin
- Died: 16 March 453 (aged 45–46); Jiankang, Liu Song
- Burial: Changning Mausoleum (長寧陵)
- Consorts: Empress Wenyuan; Empress Dowager Zhao; Empress Dowager Xuan
Names
- Family name: Liú (劉); Given name: Yìlóng (義隆) childhood name: Che'er (車兒)
Era name and dates
- Yuánjiā (元嘉): 424–453
Posthumous name
- initially Emperor Jǐng (景皇帝, lit. "decisive"), later Emperor Wén (文皇帝, lit. "civil")
Temple name
- initially Zhongzong (中宗), later Taizu (太祖)
- Father: Emperor Wu
- Mother: Empress Dowager Zhang

Emperor Wen of Liu Song (Chinese: (劉)宋文帝; pinyin: (Liu) Song Wen-di; 407 – 16 March 453), personal name Liu Yilong (劉義隆), childhood name Che'er (車兒), was the third emperor of the Liu Song dynasty of China. He was the third son of the dynastic founder Emperor Wu (Liu Yu). After his father's death in 422, Liu Yilong's eldest brother Liu Yifu took the throne as Emperor Shao. In 424, a group of officials, believing Emperor Shao to be unfit to be emperor, deposed Emperor Shao and placed Liu Yilong on the throne as Emperor Wen.

In his 29 years of rule, Emperor Wen largely continued the grand plan of his father and some of the land policies of the Jin Dynasty. The period, called the "Yuanjia administration" (元嘉之治), is seen as a period of prosperity and strength, because of the emperor's diligence and ability to find capable and honest officials to serve in his administration. However, Emperor Wen was faulted for making repeated failed attempts to attack rival Northern Wei and using the wrong strategies in doing so, weakening his state toward the end of his rule. In 453, angry that his crown prince Liu Shao was using witchcraft to curse him, he planned to depose Liu Shao; when this plan was leaked, Liu Shao staged a coup and assassinated him, replacing him on the throne, although less than a year later Liu Shao's younger brother Liu Jun (Xiulong) defeated him and took the throne as Emperor Xiaowu.

== Early life ==
Liu Yilong was born at Jingkou (京口, in modern Zhenjiang, Jiangsu) in 407, to Liu Yu and his concubine Hu Dao'an (胡道安), as Liu Yu's third son; at that time, Liu Yu was already the paramount general for Jin, and so Liu Yilong was born into a household of power and wealth. For reasons lost to history, Liu Yu put Consort Hu to death in 409. Liu Yilong's maternal grandmother Lady Su was involved in his upbringing, and he was particularly close to her as he grew up. In 410, while the Jin capital Jiankang was under attack by the warlord Lu Xun, Liu Yu had his assistant Liu Cui (劉粹) accompany the three-year-old Liu Yilong to serve as the defender of Jingkou. In 415, he was created the Duke of Pengcheng. In 417, while Liu Yu was attacking Later Qin, he had Liu Yilong, again assisted by his staff, remain at Pengcheng to serve as the governor of Xu Province (徐州, modern northern Jiangsu and Anhui), to guard his rear. In 418, after Liu Yu conquered Later Qin, Liu Yilong was made the governor of the important Jing Province (荊州, modern Hubei and Hunan), and commander of armed forces of the western empire. Those who served on his staff included Dao Yanzhi (到彥之), Zhang Shao (張邵), Wang Tanshou (王曇首), Wang Hua (王華), and Shen Linzi, with Zhang actually in charge of headquarters due to Liu Yilong's young age. After Liu Yu seized the Jin throne in 420, establishing Liu Song (as Emperor Wu), he created a number of his sons princes, and Liu Yilong was created the Prince of Yidu at that time. Around this time, he became known as studious in the Confucian classics and histories, and was also a good calligrapher.

In 424, believing Liu Yilong's older brother Emperor Shao (who had succeeded Emperor Wu after Emperor Wu's death in 422) to be frivolous and incapable of governing the empire, the high-level officials Xu Xianzhi, Fu Liang, and Xie Hui deposed and subsequently killed him, as well as another older brother of Liu Yilong's, Liu Yizhen (劉義真) the Prince of Luling, since they believed Liu Yizhen to be even less suitable than Emperor Shao. Believing Liu Yilong to be capable and lenient, they offered the throne to Liu Yilong, with Fu personally arriving with other officials at Liu Yilong's headquarters at Jiangling. Liu Yilong's associates, hearing of Emperor Shao's and Liu Yizhen's deaths, were largely suspicious and suggested that he not head east to the capital Jiankang to accept the throne. However, Wang Hua pointed out that the coup leaders were in a collective leadership, and the balance of power ensured that they could not commit treason. Wang Tanshou and Dao also agreed, and Liu Yilong decided to accept the throne, taking the throne later that year as Emperor Wen.

== Early reign ==
Initially, Emperor Wen pacified the high-level officials who were involved in deposing Emperor Shao (including not only Xu Xianzhi, Fu Liang, Xie Hui, but also Wang Tanshou's brother Wang Hong and Tan Daoji) by leaving them in power and further giving them higher offices. Indeed, he initially left most affairs of state in the hands of Xu and Fu, but gradually acquainted himself in those matters. He also hinted at disapproval of their actions by recalling the wives and mothers of Emperor Shao and Liu Yizhen to the capital and treating them with honor. He posthumously honored his mother Consort Hu as an empress dowager, and created his wife Princess Yuan Qigui as empress.

In 425, Xu and Fu offered to resign, and Emperor Wen approved and began to handle important matters of state himself. However, Xu's nephew Xu Peizhi (徐佩之) and his associates Cheng and Wang Shaozhi (王韶之) persuaded him to reconsider, and thereafter he reassumed his post. (While it was not explicitly stated in history, it appeared that Fu then did so as well.) However, Emperor Wen was resentful that Xu, Fu, and Xie had killed his two older brothers, and in late 425 planned to destroy them, particularly at the urging of Wang Hua and the general Kong Ningzi (孔寧子). He therefore mobilized troops and publicly declared that he was going to attack rival Northern Wei, but was privately preparing to arrest Xu and Fu while engaging in a military campaign against Xie, then the governor of Jing Province. In spring 426, rumors had leaked of such a plan, and so Xie began to prepare for armed resistance. Soon, Emperor Wen publicly issued an edict ordering that Xu, Fu, and Xie be arrested and killed, while issuing a separate edict summoning Xu and Fu to the palace.

Believing that Wang Hong and Tan had not been involved initially in the plot against Emperor Shao, he recalled them to the capital, and put Tan in charge of the army against Xie and Wang Hong in charge of the imperial government. Meanwhile, Xie Hui publicly mourned Xu and Fu and declared that all they did was for the empire, blaming Wang Hong, Wang Tanshou, and Wang Hua for falsely accusing them, and demanding their execution. Xie Hui had a powerful army, but while he thought that several other provincial governors would join him, they refused. He was initially able to defeat Dao's army, but soon Tan arrived, and Xie, fearful of Tan, did not know what to do. Tan quickly attacked him and defeated his fleet, and Xie fled back to Jiangling, and then fled with his brother Xie Dun (謝遯), but Xie Dun was so overweight that he could not ride a horse, and so they slowed down and were captured. He was then delivered to Jiankang and executed with Xie Jiao and Xie Dun, along with all of his nephews and major associates, although many of his associates were spared.

Emperor Wen became quickly known for his diligence in governing the state and his frugality, as well as his caring for the welfare of the people. He set up a system where officials, both at the capital and in provinces, were given relatively long office terms, but carefully monitored for their progress. He was particularly attentive to his brothers' ability to govern, offering them much advice while carefully fostering proper experience for them. One of them, Liu Yikang the Prince of Pengcheng, soon became known for his skills at governing Jing Province after replacing Xie, and in 428, Wang Hong, who was fearful of drawing attacks for having been prime minister for too long, offered to resign and give his authority to Liu Yikang. Emperor Wen declined at this point, but did transfer most of Wang Hong's authorities to Liu Yikang in 429. Also in 429, Emperor Wen created his oldest son by Empress Yuan, Liu Shao, crown prince. That year, Emperor Wen's maternal grandmother Lady Su died, and he mourned her greatly, wanting to posthumously create her titles, but because of opposition by the key official Yin Jingren (殷景仁), he did not do so.

Around this time, Emperor Wen also started preparing for a campaign against rival Northern Wei, seeking to recover several provinces lost to Northern Wei during the reign of Emperor Shao. In spring 430, he put Dao Yanzhi in command of a 50,000-man army to attack Northern Wei. Emperor Taiwu of Northern Wei, when informed by Emperor Wen's messengers that all Emperor Wen was interested in was to recover the provinces south of the Yellow River, retorted angrily that he would withdraw but return in the winter once the Yellow River froze, and that was what he initially did—withdrawing his armies south of the Yellow River to areas north, allowing Liu Song to recover the four key cities of Luoyang, Hulao, Huatai (滑台, in modern Anyang, Hunan), and Qiao'ao (碻磝, in modern Liaocheng, Shandong) without a fight. Instead of advancing further north into Northern Wei proper, however, Emperor Wen stopped and placed his troops along the Yellow River, even though he had entered into an alliance with Xia's emperor Helian Ding to conquer and divide Northern Wei. With Emperor Wen's forces immobile, Northern Wei was able to attack Helian Ding and greatly damage Xia (eventually leading to its destruction in 431) absence. Afterwards, Northern Wei prepared to attack the south. In winter 430, Emperor Wen's general Du Ji (杜驥), unable to defend Luoyang, abandoned it. Hulao soon also fell. Upon hearing this, Dao retreated, leaving the general Zhu Xiuzhi (朱脩之) defending Huatai alone. In spring 431, Emperor Wen sent Tan north to try to relieve Zhu at Huatai, but with Northern Wei forces cutting Tan's supply route off, Tan was unable to reach Huatai and forced to withdraw as well. Zhu, without support, was soon captured when Huatai fell. Emperor Wen's first attempt to regain the provinces south of the Yellow River had resulted in failure.

In 432, Wang Hong died, and Liu Yikang was, alone, prime minister after that point.

Also in 432, angry over the misgovernance of Liu Daoji (劉道濟) the governor of Yi Province (modern Sichuan and Chongqing), the people of Yi Province rose, under the command of Xu Muzhi (許穆之), who changed his name to Sima Feilong (司馬飛龍) and claimed to be a descendant of the Jin imperial clan. Liu quickly defeated and killed Sima Feilong, but the Buddhist monk Cheng Daoyang (程道養) soon rose in succession and claimed to be the real Sima Feilong, threatening Chengdu the capital of Yi Province, and while the general Pei Fangming (裴方明) was able to repel the siege, Cheng remained a threat for several years, carrying the title of the Prince of Shu. While the campaign was ongoing, Yang Nandang (楊難當) the ruler of Chouchi, who had been a nominal vassal to both Liu Song and Northern Wei, also attacked and occupied Liang Province (梁州, modern southern Shaanxi) in 433.

== Middle reign ==
In spring 434, Emperor Wen's general Xiao Sihua (蕭思話) was able to defeat Yang Nandang's forces and recapture Liang Province. Yang Nandang soon apologized, and not willing to lose a potential ally against Northern Wei, Emperor Wen accepted his apology.

In 435, Feng Hong the emperor of Northern Yan, under constant Northern Wei attack, offered to be a vassal to Liu Song to try to obtain assistance, and Emperor Wen created Feng Hong the Prince of Yan. However, Emperor Wen was unable to provide actual assistance, and Feng Hong evacuated his state and fled to Goguryeo in 436.

Around that time, a severe political infighting began to develop within Emperor Wen's administration. Jealous of Emperor Wen's bestowing of great powers to Yin Jingren, Liu Zhan (劉湛) became to try to defame Yin Jingren, and he ingratiated himself with Liu Yikang to try to use the prime minister's powers to expel Yin from government. Yin, not willing to fight Liu Zhan, offered to resign under the excuse he was ill, and while Emperor Wen refused, he permitted Yin to take an extended sick leave. The imperial government, however, became divided into a Liu Zhan-led pro-Liu Yikang faction and an anti-Liu Yikang faction.

In 436, Emperor Wen grew extremely ill. In his illness, Liu Zhan persuaded Liu Yikang that if Emperor Wen died, no one would be able to control Tan Daoji, and therefore recalled Tan to the capital from his post at Jiang Province (江州, modern Jiangxi and Fujian). After Tan arrived at Jiankang, Emperor Wen became better in his conditions and was ready to return Tan to his post, when he suddenly turned ill again. At that time, Tan was already on the dock ready to depart for Jiang Province, and Liu Yikang summoned him back to Jiankang and arrested him. Emperor Wen then issued an edict falsely accusing Tan of preparing treason and executed him with his sons, but spared his grandsons. (When Tan was arrested, he angrily threw his scarf on the ground and stated bitterly, "You have destroyed your Great Wall." When Northern Wei officials heard of Tan's death, they celebrated. The traditional account appeared to minimize Emperor Wen's involvement in Tan's death, but subsequent events appear to show that Liu Yikang acted with Emperor Wen's full approval in this matter.)

In spring 437, Emperor Wen seriously considered the proposal that Northern Wei's Emperor Taiwu had made, initially in 431 and then in 433, that the two imperial clans enter into a marital relationship—specifically, to marry one of his daughters to Emperor Taiwu's crown prince Tuoba Huang, and he sent his official Liu Xibo (劉熙伯) to Northern Wei to negotiate the terms of the marriage. However, soon thereafter, the daughter who was to marry Tuoba Huang died, and the proposal died with her.

Later in 437, the long-term rebel Cheng Daoyang the Prince of Shu was finally captured and killed, ending a seven-year rebellion.

In 438, Emperor Wen built a university to encourage students to study famous works. He set up four disciplines at the university:

- Mysticism, taught by the official He Shangzhi (何尚之)
- History, taught by the official He Chengtian (何承天)
- Literature, taught by the official Xie Yuan (謝元)
- Confucianism, taught by the hermit Lei Cizong (雷次宗)

The historian Sima Guang, author of Zizhi Tongjian, made the following commentary about Emperor Wen with regard to the status of his state at this time:

Emperor [Wen] was kind and honest, humble and frugal, diligent and law-abiding, not overly critical of others and willing to accept others, but he also did not overly relax them. The officials all remained in their offices for long terms. The commandery governors and the county magistrates had set terms of six years. He did not frivlolously remove officials from their posts, and the people had the sense of security. During his 30 years of reign, his empire was peaceful, the population increased, and the taxes were limited to the proper amounts, with no additional levies. The men were able to leave their homes to till their fields in the morning and return home to rest at night, without excessive labor, and they were content. The sounds of book-reading could be heard throughout even the countryside. The learned men cared for their virtues, and even the countryfolk felt that carelessness was a disgrace. The customs of the area south of the Yangtze River were the most beautiful at his time. In later ages, when discussions of prior administrations were made, the rule of Yuanjia [Emperor Wen's era name] was all greatly praised.

Emperor Wen's attention to imperial officials' abilities could be seen partly in 439, when, according to an edict that Emperor Wu had left that his sons were to serve as the governor of Jing Province in rotation by age, he was supposed to make his brother Liu Yixuan (劉義宣) the Prince of Nanqiao the governor of Jing Province. However, because he believed Liu Yixuan to be incompetent, he refused, skipping him and giving the post to the more capable brother Liu Yiji (劉義季) the Prince of Hengyang, the governor of Jing Province. (Several years later, after Liu Yiji's death, and with much urging from his older sister Liu Xingdi (劉興弟) the Princess Kuaiji, he finally did make Liu Yixuan the governor of Jing Province, but only after much advice on how to properly govern the province.)

By 440, however, Liu Yikang, a major part of the success of Emperor Wen's government due to his diligence and abilities, had become so flattered by Liu Zhan that he appeared to blur the distinction between himself, as a subject, and the emperor. When Emperor Wen grew ill again, Liu Zhan and Liu Yikang's associates Liu Bin (劉斌), Wang Lü (王履), Liu Jingwen (劉敬文), and Kong Yinxiu (孔胤秀) secretly plotted to have Liu Yikang succeed Emperor Wen, against Emperor Wen's wishes to have Crown Prince Shao be emperor and Liu Yikang serve as regent. When Emperor Wen grew better, he began to suspect Liu Yikang of wanting to usurp the throne. In winter 440, he put Liu Yikang under house arrest, while arresting and executing Liu Zhan and a number of other associates of Liu Yikang. He then removed Liu Yikang from his prime minister post and made him the governor of Jiang Province, while restoring Yin Jingren to power. He replaced Liu Yikang with another younger brother, Liu Yigong (劉義恭) the Prince of Jiangxia, but Liu Yigong, realizing the danger in wielding too much power, did not involve himself much in actual decision-making. Later that year, Yin Jingren died, and the important responsibilities became split between several officials.

In 441, Yang Nandang, not willing to give up his grandiose designs on Liang and Yi Provinces, attacked Liu Song. Emperor Wen sent Pei Fangming and another general, Liu Zhendao (劉真道), to attack Chouchi, and in the only instance at which a southern dynasty army occupied Chouchi, took it over in 442, forcing Yang Nandang to flee to Northern Wei. However, by 443, Chouchi had fallen to Northern Wei forces, and Pei and Liu Zhendao were executed for having embezzled treasures and horses from Chouchi during the 441 to 442 campaign.

== Late reign ==
In 445, in a famous incident, while waiting to send his brother Liu Yiji off to his new post as governor of Southern Yan Province (南兗州, modern central Jiangsu), Emperor Wen ordered his sons not to eat until dinner is served at the sendoff, but then intentionally had dinner served late, so that his sons would suffer from hunger, and then telling them, "You grew up in a rich household and do not see the people being poor. I intended that you understand the pain from hunger so that you would learn to be frugal and caring for the people." However, while this incident general drew praise from historians, some historians, including Pei Ziye (裴子野), a commentator to the Song Shu, found it hypocritical in that he was putting his sons in high offices at young ages without being properly trained.

After that feast, an alleged plot involving the official (and compiler of Book of the Later Han) Fan Ye was exposed—as it was alleged that Fan had plotted with his nephew Xie Zong (謝綜) and the deposed prime minister Li Yikang's associate Kong Xixian (孔熙先) to assassinate Emperor Wen at the feast for Liu Yiji and then making Liu Yikang emperor. One of the coconspirators, Emperor Wen's nephew Xu Danzhi (徐湛之), after the assassination failed to occur at the feast, informed on his co-conspirators, and other than Xu, the conspirators were all executed. (The historian Wang Mingsheng (王鳴盛) found the alleged plot far-fetched, and believed instead that Fan had been the victim of false accusations by Xu, Yu Bingzhi (庾炳之), and He Shangzhi.) In the aftermaths of the plot, Liu Yikang, whose connection to the plot appeared tenuous at best, was stripped of his title, demoted to commoner rank, and put under house arrest. There would be repeated plots by others to put Liu Yikang on the throne, and by 451, fearful that such a plot would again develop during the midst of a Northern Wei invasion, Emperor Wen would, against promises he made to his older sister Liu Xingdi the Princess Kuaiji, have Liu Yikang killed.

In 446, when Northern Wei was facing a rebellion from the ethnically-Lushuihu Gai Wu (蓋吳), Emperor Wen commissioned Gai as a duke and a general, although he provided no actual military support for Gai. This, however, aggravated Northern Wei's Emperor Taiwu, and after Emperor Taiwu put down Gai's rebellion, the relationship between the two states turned sour, particularly in light of a horrific raid that Northern Wei troops carried out against Liu Song's Qing (青州, modern central and eastern Shandong), Ji (冀州, modern northwestern Shandong), and Yan (兗州, modern western Shandong) Provinces later that year.

By 449, Emperor Wen was preparing a second campaign to recover the provinces south of the Yellow River, and many generals and officials, in response, submitted battle plans, and the general Wang Xuanmo (王玄謨) submitted plans that Emperor Wen particularly liked. In preparation, Emperor Wen moved the troops stationed and supplies stored in the internal provinces to the boundary provinces. Meanwhile, however, before he could launch the campaign, Northern Wei's Emperor Taiwu invaded first in spring 450, putting Xuanhu (懸瓠, in modern Zhumadian, Henan) under siege for 42 days, and after much loss on both sides, Emperor Taiwu withdrew without having captured Xuanhu. This made Emperor Wen believe that Northern Wei's military power was waning, and he decided to launch his attack late in 450, despite oppositions by the generals Liu Kangzu (劉康祖), who believed that the campaign should begin in spring 451, Shen Qingzhi (沈慶之), who opined that Liu Song was not in shape to fight a war against Northern Wei, Xiao Sihua, and Crown Prince Shao.

The Liu Song forces, under the commands of Xiao Bin (蕭斌) and Wang Xuanmo, quickly took Qiao'ao and Le'an (樂安, in modern Tangshan, Hebei), as Northern Wei forces abandoned those two cities quickly, and then put Huatai under siege. The Han people around Huatai were initially gladly supporting the Liu Song campaign, but Wang ordered them to submit a large number of pears, causing them to be angry and turn against Liu Song. Liu Song forces, as a consequence, could not capture Huatai quickly, and in winter 450, Emperor Taiwu crossed the Yellow River, and Wang's forces collapsed, forcing him to flee back to Qiao'ao. Xiao considered defending Qiao'ao against the coming Northern Wei assault, but Shen persuaded him that doing so was futile, and despite orders from Emperor Wen to defend Qiao'ao, Xiao led the main forces back to Licheng (歷城, in modern Jinan, Shandong) to preserve the strength of the army. Meanwhile, due to Wang's defeat at Huatai, although the general Liu Wenjing (柳文景) was able to capture Tong Pass in the west and threaten Northern Wei's Guanzhong region, Emperor Wen chose to recall Liu and abandon the western advances as well.

In retaliation for the Liu Song attack, Emperor Taiwu launched an all-out attack against Liu Song's northern provinces. Emperor Taiwu's nephew Tuoba Ren (拓跋仁) quickly captured Xuanhu and Xiangcheng (項城, in modern Zhoukou, Henan) and pillaging his way to Shouyang. Emperor Taiwu himself advanced on Pengcheng, but did not put that heavily fortified city under siege; rather, he advanced south, claiming that he would cross the Yangtze River and destroy the Liu Song capital Jiankang. Both his main army and the other branch armies that he sent out carried out heavy slaughters and arsons, laying Liu Song's Huai River region to waste. Around the new year 451, Emperor Taiwu had reached Guabu (瓜步, in modern Nanjing, Jiangsu), across the river from Jiankang, but at this point he reproposed the marriage-peace proposal he made earlier—that if Emperor Wen married a daughter to one of his grandsons, he would be willing to marry a daughter to Emperor Wen's son, Liu Xiulong (who was then defending Pengcheng), to establish long-term peace. Crown Prince Shao favored the proposal, but Jiang Dan (江湛) opposed, and the marital proposal was not accepted. In spring 451, worried that his forces were being overstretched and would be attacked in the rear by the Liu Song forces garrisoned at Pengcheng and Shouyang, Emperor Taiwu began a withdraw, and on the way, insulted by the Liu Song general Zang Zhi (臧質), he put Xuyi (盱眙, in modern Huai'an, Jiangsu) under siege, and, after both sides suffered heavy losses but with the defense holding, quickly withdrew. This campaign appeared to heavily wear out both empires and demonstrated the cruel parts of Emperor Taiwu's personality well, as Sima Guang described it in this manner:

The Wei forces laid South Yan, Xu, North Yan, Yu, Qing, and Ji Provinces to waste. The Song deaths and injuries were innumerable. When Wei forces encountered Song young men, the forces quickly beheaded them or cut them in half. The infants were pierced through with spears, and the spears were then shaken so that the infants would scream as they were spun, for entertainment. The commanderies and counties that Wei forces went through were burned and slaughtered, and not even grass was left. When sparrows returned in the spring, they could not find houses to build nest on, so they had to do so in forests. Wei soldiers and horses also suffered casualties of more than half, and the Xianbei people were all complaining.

Sima Guang further attributed Emperor Wen's military failures to his command style:

Every time Emperor [Wen] sent generals out on battles, he required them to follow the complete battle plans that he had drafted, and even the dates for battles needed approval from the emperor. Therefore, the generals all hesitated and could not make independent decisions. Further, the non-regular troops that he conscripted were not trained, and they rushed to advance when they were victorious and scattered when they were defeated. These were the two reasons why he failed, and from this point on, the state was in recession, and the Reign of Yuanjia was in decline.

As another historian, Shen Yue, pointed out, Emperor Wen modelled his military planning on those of Emperor Guangwu of Han, but lacked Emperor Guangwu's military command abilities, and therefore could not draft proper military plans the way that Emperor Guangwu did. Under Emperor Wen of Song, Zhang Chang helped defeat the Northern Wei invasion of Pengcheng.

In 452, after hearing that Northern Wei's Emperor Taiwu had been assassinated by his eunuch Zong Ai, Emperor Wen prepared another campaign, with his army commanded by Xiao Xihua—but not realizing that his micromanaging had greatly contributed to the failure of the prior campaign, he made the micromanaging even more complete. After Xiao's assisting general Zhang Yong (張永) was defeated at Qiao'ao, however, he abandoned the campaign.

Meanwhile, though, Emperor Wen himself was facing a crisis within his household. It had been discovered that Crown Prince Shao and another son of Emperor Wen's, Liu Xiuming the Prince of Shixing, had secretly retained the witch Yan Daoyu (嚴道育) to curse Emperor Wen to death so that Crown Prince Shao could become emperor. Emperor Wen, while angry, only strongly rebuked his sons and was unwilling to take further punitive actions against them. By 453, however, Emperor Wen's hopes that his sons had reformed themselves was shattered—as he found evidence that they continued to associate with Yan even after the rebukes. He therefore discussed with his high-level officials Xu Danzhi, Jiang Dan, and Wang Sengchuo (王僧綽) his planned punishment of deposing Crown Prince Shao and ordering Liu Xiuming to commit suicide. However, he made the mistakes of discussing the plans with Liu Xiuming's mother, Consort Pan, and Consort Pan quickly informed Liu Xiuming, who then informed Crown Prince Shao. In spring 453, Crown Prince Shao carried out a coup, sending his own guards to secure the palace while sending his close associate Zhang Chaozhi (張超之) into the palace to assassinate Emperor Wen. When Zhang entered Emperor Wen's bedchambers with a sword, Emperor Wen's guards were asleep, and Emperor Wen tried to hold a small desk to hold off Zhang's attack. Zhang's first swing, however, cut off Emperor Wen's fingers, and he then swung again, killing Emperor Wen. After some confusion, Liu Shao killed Xu and Jiang as well, and then falsely declared that Xu and Jiang had assassinated Emperor Wen; he then took the throne himself, although later that year he was defeated and killed by another brother of his, Liu Xiulong the Prince of Wuling, who took the throne as Emperor Xiaowu.

Liu Shao initially gave his father the posthumous name Emperor Jing (景皇帝) with the temple name Zhongzong (中宗). After Emperor Xiaowu took the throne, he changed the posthumous name to Emperor Wen and the temple name to Taizu (太祖).

== Family ==
- Empress Wenyuan, of the Yuan clan of Chen (文元皇后 陳郡袁氏; 405–440), personal name Qigui (齊媯)
  - Liu Shao, Emperor (皇帝 劉劭; 424–453), first son
  - Princess Xian of Dongyang (東陽獻公主), personal name Ying'e (英娥)
    - Married Wang Sengchuo of Langya (瑯琊 王僧綽; 423–453), and had issue (Wang Jian)
- Empress Dowager Zhao, of the Lu clan (昭皇太后 路氏; 412–466), personal name Huinan (惠男)
  - Liu Jun, Emperor Xiaowu (孝武皇帝 劉駿; 430–464), third son
- Empress Dowager Xuan, of the Shen clan (宣皇太后 沈氏; 414–453), personal name Rongji (容姬)
  - Liu Yu, Emperor Ming (明皇帝 劉彧; 439–472), 11th son
- Shufei, of the Pan clan (淑妃 潘氏; d. 453)
  - Liu Jun, Prince of Shixing (始興王 劉浚; 429–453), second son
- Shuyi, of the Wu clan (淑儀 吳氏)
  - Liu Shuo, Prince Mu of Nanping (南平穆王 劉鑠; 431–453), fourth son
- Xiuhua, of the Yin clan (修華 殷氏; d. 459)
  - Liu Dan, Prince of Jingling (竟陵王 劉誕; 433–459), sixth son
- Xiurong, of the Chen clan (修容 陳氏)
  - Liu Hui, Prince of Lujiang (廬江王 劉褘; 436–470), eighth son
- Xiuyi, of the Gao clan (修儀 高氏)
  - Liu Shao, Prince Zhao of Luling (廬陵昭王 劉紹; 432–452), fifth son
- Xiuyi, of the Jiang clan (修儀 江氏)
  - Liu Hun, Prince of Wuchang (武昌王 劉渾; 439–455), tenth son
- Xiuyi, of the Yang clan (修儀 楊氏)
  - Liu Xiuren, Prince of Jian'an (建安王 劉休仁; 443–471), 12th son
- Jieyu, of the Cao clan (婕妤 曹氏)
  - Liu Hong, Prince Xuanjian of Jianping (建平宣簡王 劉宏; 434–458), seventh son
- Ronghua, of the Xie clan (容華 謝氏)
  - Liu Chang, Prince of Yiyang (義陽王 劉昶; 436–497), ninth son
- Meiren, of the Jiang clan (美人 蔣氏; d. 446)
  - Princess Haiyan (海鹽公主), fourth daughter
    - Married Zhao Qian (趙倩)
- Meiren, of the Xing clan (美人 邢氏)
  - Liu Xiuyou, Prince La of Jinping (晉平剌王 劉休佑; 445–471), 13th son
- Meiren, of the Cai clan (美人 蔡氏; d. 458)
  - Liu Xiumao, Prince of Hailing (海陵王 劉休茂; 445–461), 14th son
- Meiren, of the Dong clan (美人 董氏)
  - Liu Xiuye, Prince Ai of Poyang (鄱陽哀王 劉休業; 445–456), 15th son
- Meiren, of the Yan clan (美人 顏氏)
  - Liu Xiuqian, Prince Chong of Linqing (臨慶衝王 劉休倩; 446–454), 16th son
- Meiren, of the Chen clan (美人 陳氏)
  - Liu Yifu, Prince Huai of Xinye (新野懷王 劉夷父; 447–452), 17th son
- Meiren, of the Xun clan (美人 荀氏)
  - Liu Xiufan, Prince of Guiyang (桂陽王 劉休範; 448–474), 18th son
- Meiren, of the Luo clan (美人 羅氏)
  - Liu Xiuruo, Prince Ai of Baling (巴陵哀王 劉休若; 448–471), 19th son
- Unknown
  - Princess Changcheng (長城公主), fifth daughter
    - Married Xie Wei of Chen (陳郡 謝緯), and had issue (Xie Tiao)
  - Princess Linchuan (臨川公主), personal name Yingyuan (英媛), sixth daughter
    - Married Wang Zao of Langya (瑯琊 王藻; d. 465)
  - Princess Huaiyang (淮陽公主), ninth daughter
    - Married Jiang Nen of Jiyang (濟陽 江恁), and had issue (one son)
  - Princess Xincai (新蔡公主), personal name Yingmei (英媚), tenth daughter
    - Married He Mai of Lujiang (廬江 何邁; d. 465)
    - Married Liu Ziye, Emperor (449–466)
  - Princess Nanyang (南陽公主), 15th daughter
    - Married Xu Hengzhi of Donghai, Marquis Zhijiang (東海 徐恆之)
  - Princess Langyazhen (琅邪貞公主), sixth daughter
    - Married Chu Ai of Henan (河南 褚曖), and had issue (one son)
  - Princess Nanxian (南獻公主), 16th daughter
    - Married Meng Shao (孟劭)
    - Married Chu Yuan of Henan (河南; 435–482)
  - Princess Xunyang (尋陽公主)
    - Married Xi Ye of Gaoping (高平 郗燁), and had issue (one son, one daughter)
  - Princess Lujiang (廬江公主)
    - Married Chu Cheng of Henan (河南 褚澄; d. 483), and had issue (Lady Chu Lingqu)

Regnal titles
Preceded by Emperor Shao of Song	Emperor of Liu Song; 424–453	Succeeded by Liu Shao
