= Chu Pou =

Jin dynasty consort kin, minister and general (303 - Jan 350)

- 褚裒

Guard General (衛將軍)
- In office 344–350
- Monarch: Emperor Mu of Jin

Grand General Who Conquers the North (征北大將軍)
- In office 346–350
- Monarch: Emperor Mu of Jin

Personal details
- Born: 303
- Died: 1 January 350 (aged 46–47) Jingkou, Eastern Jin
- Children: Chu Suanzi (daughter); Chu Xin (son); Chu Lingyuan (great granddaughter)
- Parent: Chu Qia (father)
- Occupation: Military general, politician
- Courtesy name: Jiye (季野)
- Posthumous name: Yuanmu (元穆)

Chu Pou (303 (Note: According to Chu Pou's biography in Book of Jin, he was 47 (by East Asian reckoning) when he died. Thus by calculation, his birth year should be in 303.) – 1 January 350 (Note: The Zizhi Tongjian recorded that Chu Pou died on the jiyou day of the 12th month of the 5th year of the Yonghe era of Sima Dan's reign. This corresponds to 1 Jan 350 in the Julian calendar.)), courtesy name Jiye, was a Chinese military general and politician of the Eastern Jin. His daughter was Chu Suanzi, the wife of Emperor Kang of Jin and empress dowager to three subsequent emperors. He was at first a mid-level ranking official in the dynasty but held several prominent posts after his daughter became empress. In 349, he led a northern expedition, the first of a series that continued into the 350s. However, the campaign ended disastrously after the Later Zhao commander Li Nong defeated Chu Pou at Dai Slope (代陂, east of present-day Tengzhou, Shandong). Chu Pou died in shame shortly after.

== Early life and career ==
Chu Pou was from Yangdi County (陽翟, modern Yuzhou, Henan) in Henan Commandery. His grandfather, Chu Lüe (褚䂮), was a reputable man who served as General Who Maintains The East, while Chu Pou's father, Chu Qia (褚洽), served as Prefect of Wuchang. (Note: Pou's paternal cousin Chu Sha (褚翜; 275-341) has a biography in vol.77 of Book of Jin.) Before he joined politics, his fame was on par with Du Ai (杜乂; grandson of Du Yu and father of Du Lingyang). Both Huan Yi (father of Huan Wen) and Xie An (Note: Chu was about 17 years older than Xie.) had praise for him. When Chu Pou first entered the government, he served on the staff of the Prince of Xiyang, Sima Yang (司馬羕) and the Prince of Wu, Sima Yue (posthumously known as Emperor Kang of Jin). Chu Pou was Xi Jian's Army Advisor during Su Jun's rebellion in 328, and after it ended, Chu Pou became Marquis of the Capital District. He grew to become Attendant Officer of the Household Gentlemen to the Minister Over The Masses and later transferred to Attendant Gentleman of the Yellow Gate. When Sima Yue was still the Prince of Langya, he married Chu Pou's daughter, Chu Suanzi, and Chu Pou later became the Prefect of Yuzhang (豫章郡; around present-day Nanchang, Jiangxi).

== During Emperor Kang and Emperor Mu's reigns ==
Emperor Cheng died in 342, and Sima Yue ascended the throne. The now Emperor Kang made Chu Suanzi his empress and summoned her father to Jiankang to make him Palace Attendant and Master of Writing. However, Chu Pou was not keen on accepting his position in the capital, as he feared he would hold too much power for being the empress's father (consort kin). Instead, he requested to be assigned away from the capital, so Emperor Kang had him positioned in Banzhou, where he served as Inspector of Jiangzhou. During his farewell banquet at Banqiao, Sima Wuji (司馬無忌) attempted to assassinate a guest, Wang Qizhi (王耆之), but Chu Pou ordered the guards to restrain him and saved Qizhi.

Despite his insistence to remain away, the court managed to have Chu Pou return to Jiankang in 343. Chu Pou refused to take any more offices in Jiankang, so in 344, he was made Inspector of Yanzhou and set out for Jincheng (金城, in modern-day Yongji, Shaanxi). Emperor Kang died that same year, and Chu Pou's grandson, Emperor Mu of Jin, succeeded him. As the new emperor was still young, He Chong believed that being the empress dowager's father, Chu Pou should involve himself more in the court, so He sent a petition calling for Chu Pou to assist him in the affairs of the Masters of Writing. Chu Pou was showered with many offices and was allowed to retain his old ones, but Chu Pou feared that this would only result in criticism from the other ministers. He asked to receive a border post instead, so the court sent him to Jingkou, where he held command over Xuzhou, Yanzhou, and Qingzhou and two commanderies in Yangzhou.

Chu Pou was again summoned to Jiankang to become Inspector of Yangzhou and chief of affairs of the Masters of Writing. However, he refused to take them and returned to his post after the ministers Liu Xia (劉遐) and Wang Huzhi (王胡之) told him to do so to give Sima Yu more responsibility in the state's affair. In 346, Chu Pou recommended Gu He (顧和) and Yin Hao serve in the Jin administration. Gu He refused, but Yin Hao, after some persuading, agreed.

== Northern expedition ==
In 349, a military expedition to the north was ripe as Later Zhao descended into civil war between Shi Hu's family after his death. As news reached the south, Chu Pou submitted a petition asking to lead a campaign against Zhao. With readied troops, Chu Pou marched to Sikou (泗口, located at Xuzhou, Jiangsu), where he planned his next move. The court was worried about Chu Pou leading the campaign as they may risk losing a prominent minister. However, his general Wang Yizhi (王頤之) was already on his way to Pengcheng, and he planned to continue into Xiapi. Chu Pou became Grand Commander, and as his men captured Pengcheng, many of the Han Chinese came out and surrendered to him.

The people of Lu Commandery rose against Zhao and asked Chu Pou to help them. Chu Pou sent Wang Kan (王龕) and Li Mai (李邁) to welcome them. The Zhao general, Li Nong, who shared power with Shi Min over the Zhao emperor, Shi Jian, personally led his army and attacked Wang Kan at Dai Slope. Li Nong destroyed the Jin army and killed Wang Kan, prompting Chu Pou to make a panicked retreat to Guangling. Upon hearing Chu Pou's defeat, the commander in Shouchun, Chen Kui (陳逵), burnt down the city and fled.

== Death ==
Chu Pou's humiliating defeat caused him to request his demotion. The court only ordered him to return to Jingkou and removed him from the position of commander. Many Chinese had openly fled in thousands to the south after hearing Chu Pou had led troops to help them, but after he was defeated, many were defenceless and slaughtered by the Zhao army. Chu Pou arrived at Jingkou and saw many people in mourning. After asking why they were that way, he found out that most of their relatives had died at Dai Slope. Chu Pou felt shame and grew ill because of this. He died on 1 January 350 and was posthumously named Marquis Yuanmu of Duxiang.

== Family and descendants ==
Chu Pou was known to have at least 2 wives who predeceased him, Lady Xun and Lady Bian. He had another wife, Lady Xie Zhenshi (Xie Shang's sister), who gave birth to his daughter Chu Suanzi in 324. During the reign of his grandson Sima Dan, Chu Suanzi (now empress dowager) received an official petition stating that since Lady Xie had already received a title, Ladies Xun and Bian should be granted titles posthumously as well. Empress Dowager Chu dismissed the petition.

Chu Pou also had a son, Chu Xin (褚歆). Chu Xin had a son, Chu Shuang (褚爽). Chu Shuang had a daughter, Chu Lingyuan, who was the last empress consort of the Eastern Jin, as the wife of Emperor Gong. Chu Shuang also had at least 3 sons: Xiuzhi (秀之), Yanzhi (炎之) and Yuzhi (喻之 (Note: This name is recorded in Chu Shuang's biography in Book of Jin. In Chu Yuzhi's biography in Book of Song, he is addressed by his courtesy name Shudu (叔度) as his "Yu" is the same character as Liu Yu's name, as acknowledged in the biography; volume 28 of Nan Shi records his name as "裕之".)).
