= Yao Hong =

Yao Hong 姚泓
- Emperor of Later Qin

Emperor of Later Qin
- Reign: 416–417
- Predecessor: Yao Xing
- Born: 388
- Died: 417 (aged 28–29); Jiankang, Eastern Jin
Names
- Yao Hong (姚泓)
Era name and dates
- Yǒnghé (永和): 416–417
- House: Yao
- Dynasty: Later Qin
- Father: Yao Xing

Yao Hong (Chinese: 姚泓; 388–417), courtesy name Yuanzi (元子), was the last emperor of the Qiang-led Later Qin dynasty of China. He was the oldest son and heir of Yao Xing (Emperor Wenzhao), who was already regarded as kind but weak during his father's reign, and after his father's death, with the state already weakened by attacks by the Hu Xia dynasty and with his brothers and cousins repeatedly rebelling, the Eastern Jin general Liu Yu took advantage of Yao Hong's weaknesses to conquer Later Qin. After he surrendered, Liu Yu had him delivered to the Eastern Jin capital Jiankang and executed.

== Under Yao Xing's reign ==
Yao Hong was born in 388, during the reign of his grandfather Yao Chang (Emperor Wuzhao), two years after Yao Chang took Chang'an as his capital and created Yao Hong's father Yao Xing as his crown prince. He was Yao Xing's oldest son. The first historical reference to Yao Hong was in 402, when Yao Xing, who became emperor in 394, created him crown prince, after much hesitation, as Yao Hong was described as loving and kind, but weak in his personality and often ill. Yao Hong was also described as favoring arts and literature. Later in 402, when Yao Xing battled Emperor Daowu of Northern Wei, Yao Hong was in charge at the capital. In 407, Yao Xing transferred some imperial authorities to him. In 409, when Yao Xing was battling the rebel general Liu Bobo, who had established Xia, Yao Hong was again in charge of the capital when Liu Jue (劉厥) rebelled, and Yao Hong defeated his rebellion. When his subordinates suggested that the victory be commemorated on an open bulletin, written on cloth, Yao Hong declined, reasoning that it was his responsibility to make sure that no rebellion occurred, and that such a victory over a rebel was nothing to be proud of.

By 411, Yao Hong's brother Yao Bi (姚弼) the Duke of Guangping, who was much favored by Yao Xing for his talents, was conspiring with his associates to seize the crown prince position from Yao Hong. For the next several years, Yao Bi tried to undermine Yao Hong's authority whenever he could, and in 414, Yao Bi falsely accused Yao Hong's associate Yao Wenzong (姚文宗) of crimes, causing Yao Xing to force Yao Wenzong to commit suicide. This caused many imperial officials to fear Yao Bi's power, and many joined his conspiracy. As Yao Xing grew ill that year, Yao Bi secretly planned a coup, causing his brothers Yao Yi (姚懿), Yao Huang (姚洸), and Yao Chen (姚諶) to mobilize their forces to prepare to act against him. Yao Xing, who then recovered somewhat, was then advised by his officials Liang Xi (梁喜) and Yin Zhao (尹昭) to execute or at least strip Yao Bi of his authority. Yao Xing relieved Yao Bi of his posts, and Yao Yi, Yao Huang, and Yao Chen demobilized.

In 412, however, Yao Bi falsely accused another brother, Yao Xuan (姚宣) (who had spoken against him in 411 as well) of crimes, causing Yao Xuan to be imprisoned. Yao Xing gave Yao Xuan's forces to Yao Bi, who then returned to his plots. Yao Xing discovered this and executed Yao Bi's associates Tang Sheng (唐盛) and Sun Xuan (孫玄), but when Yao Xing arrested and was ready to execute Yao Bi as well, Yao Hong pleaded for Yao Bi's life, and Yao Xing spared Yao Bi.

In 416, Yao Xing went to the vacation palace at Huayin (華陰), and he had Yao Hong formally serve as regent at Chang'an and stay in the palace. Yao Xing grew gravely ill at Huayin, however, and was on the way back to Chang'an when his attendant Yin Chong (尹沖), a conspirator with Yao Bi, planned to assassinate Yao Hong when he comes out of the palace to welcome his father. Yao Hong's associates, however, heard rumors of the plot and persuaded him not to come out of the palace. Yin Chong's assistant Yao Shami (姚沙彌) then suggested to Yin that they deliver Yao Xing to Yao Bi's home and start a rebellion there, but Yin hesitated and did not carry this suggestion out. As soon as Yao Xing returned to the palace, he ordered that Yao Bi's home be searched and that all weapons be seized. When Yao Yin (姚愔) the Duke of Nanyang, another brother who was in alliance with Yao Bi, then attacked the palace with Yin Chong, planning to put Yao Bi on the throne, Yao Xing publicly ordered that Yao Bi be forced to commit suicide, causing Yao Yin's force to collapse. The next day, Yao Xing, after entrusting Yao Hong to his brother Yao Shao (姚紹) the Duke of Dongping, Liang Xi, Yin Zhao, and Lian Manwei (斂曼嵬), died. Yao Hong initially did not announce news of Yao Xing's death, but did so only after executing Yao Yin and Yao Bi's other associates—including Lü Long the Duke of Jiankang and the former prince of Later Liang, and Yin Yuan (尹元). Yao Hong then took the throne and, not using the secondary imperial title that his father had used ("Heavenly King" (Tian Wang)), directly claimed imperial title.

== Reign ==
Yao Hong, who immediately faced threats from both Jin and Xia forces, was heavily dependent on his uncle Yao Shao to face both these external threats, and the rebellions by his brothers and cousins, who apparently believed him to be an easy target to seize the throne from. The Jin general Liu Yu, seeing Later Qin's internal unrest as an opportunity, launched a major attack in fall 416 and quickly seized the eastern half of Later Qin, including the important city of Luoyang.

Late 416, Yao Yi, who was in charge of Puban (蒲阪, in modern Yuncheng, Shanxi), rebelled, but with little popular support, Yao Shao was able to quickly capture Puban and arrest him. However, rebellions continued. In 417, Yao Hong's cousin Yao Hui (姚恢) the Duke of Qi rebelled, abandoning his post of Anding (安定, in modern Pingliang, Gansu) and using all forces at Anding (a major defense post during Later Qin) against Yao Hong. Yao Shao and his son Yao Zan (姚讚), however, were able to capture and kill Yao Hui quickly as well.

Meanwhile, however, Jin forces continued to advance, and when Yao Shao and Yao Zan then engaged Liu Yu's generals Tan Daoji and Shen Linzi, they were unable to stop them, and Yao Shao, humiliated by the defeats, died of illness. Yao Zan tried to continue to resist, but was continuously defeated.

Yao Hong decided to lead an army of several tens of thousands against Liu Yu's main army, commanded by Tan and Shen, but concerned that a branch force commanded by Shen Linzi's brother Shen Tianzi (沈田子), which in actuality had less than 1,000 men but had advanced to Qingni (青泥, in modern Xi'an, Shaanxi), would attack his rear, tried to attack Shen Tianzi first, but was defeated by the heavily outnumbered Shen Tianzi, causing his army to collapse, and he was forced to return to Chang'an without having faced Liu Yu's main army. Liu Yu's fleet, commanded by Wang Zhen'e, then arrived at Chang'an, and the soldiers, after landing, attacked the Later Qin garrison at the city gates overlooking the Wei River. Yao Hong tried to personally relieve the garrison at the city gates, but his army and the garrison force trampled themselves and collapsed without engaging Wang, and he fled back to the palace.

Back at the palace, Yao Hong considered surrendering. His 10-year-old son Yao Fonian (姚佛念) opined that they would be executed anyway, and that it would be better to commit suicide. Yao Hong declined, and Yao Fo'nian himself climbed up a wall and jumped to his death. Yao Hong, instead, along with his empress, surrendered to Wang, who arrested him and had him delivered to the Jin capital Jiankang. Yao Hong was executed there, and most members of the Yao clan who were captured or who surrendered were also executed. Later Qin was at its end.

== Era name ==
- Yonghe (永和 yǒng hé) 416–417

== Personal information ==
- Father
  - Yao Xing (Emperor Wenzhao)
- Wife
  - Empress (name unknown)
- Children
  - Yao Fonian (姚佛念) (b. 407, committed suicide 417)

(Later) Qin Houzhu House of Yao Born: 388 Died: 417
Regnal titles
Preceded by Yao Xing	Emperor of Later Qin; 416–417	Extinct
Titles in pretence
Preceded by Yao Xing	— TITULAR — Emperor of China; 416–417; Reason for succession failure: Annexed by Eastern Jin	Succeeded by Emperor An of Jin
Preceded by Yao Xing	— TITULAR — Emperor of China; 416–417; Reason for succession failure: Annexed by Eastern Jin	Succeeded by Helian Bobo
