= Chu Lingyuan =

Chu Lingyuan 褚靈媛

Empress consort of the Eastern Jin dynasty
- Tenure: 12 February 419 – 5 July 420
- Predecessor: Wang Shen'ai
- Born: 384
- Died: 7 August 436 (aged 51–52); Jiankang, Liu Song
- Spouse: Emperor Gong of Jin
- Issue: Princess Haiyan; Princess Fuyang
Posthumous name
- Empress Gongsi (恭思皇后)
- Father: Chu Shuang

Chu Lingyuan (Chinese: 褚靈媛; 384 – 7 August 436), posthumous name Empress Gongsi (恭思皇后), was the last empress consort of the Chinese Eastern Jin dynasty. Her husband was the last emperor of the dynasty, Emperor Gong (Sima Dewen).

== Family background ==
Chu Lingyuan was a daughter of the commandery governor Chu Shuang (褚爽), who was a grandson of the official Chu Pou (via Pou's son Chu Xin), making Chu Lingyuan a grandniece of Emperor Kang's wife Empress Chu Suanzi. Chu Lingyuan also had three older brothers: Chu Xiuzhi (褚秀之; 378-424), Chu Danzhi (褚淡之; 380-424), and Chu Yuzhi (褚裕之; (Note: This name appears in volume 28 of Nan Shi.) 381-424 (Note: According to Chu Yuzhi's biography in Book of Song, he died aged 44 (by East Asian reckoning) in the 2nd year of the Jingping era of Liu Yifu's reign. Thus by calculation, his birth year should be 381.)) (Note: known by his courtesy name Shudu (叔度) in some records as his "Yu" is the same as Liu Yu's name.)

== Biography ==
It is not known exactly when she married Emperor Gong, but the marriage took place while he was the Prince of Langye (from 27 December 392, to 27 Jan 419, with an interruption from 404 (Note: Huan Xuan usurped the throne in this year.) to April/May 405), during the reign of his developmentally disabled brother Emperor An. During their marriage, she bore two daughters – Sima Maoying (who was created the Princess Haiyan), and the Princess Fuyang, whose name is lost to history. (Note: The Persian historian, Ferdowsi, (فردوسی), author of the Šâhnâme, lit. The Book of Kings, and the national epic of Greater Iran, tells that Bahram V Gor, (420-438) of the Sasanian dynasty of Persia married the daughter, Furak, of the raja (king) of India, who is Khingila or Shingil, K. of Alkhan. He also mentions that the pertinent father-in-law of Khi-gi-la was Faghfur (Emperor) of China. After extensive research and investigation, I have found one kingdom at the time and place required, (and those kingdoms were in the tens), who had a princess available. Until someone else more fluent in Persian or Chinese looks into this fascinating possibility, that's how the possibilities stand as of this typing.)

After the regent Liu Yu killed Emperor An in 419 and made Sima Dewen emperor, she was created empress on 12 February. Emperor Gong subsequently was forced to give up the throne to Liu Yu in 420, ending Jin. Liu Yu, who established the Liu Song dynasty, created the former Jin emperor the Prince of Lingling, and Empress Chu received the title Princess of Lingling.

However, Liu Yu viewed the former emperor and any male progeny that he might bear as threats, and therefore had Chu Xiuzhi and Chu Danzhi (both Liu-Song officials) poison any male infants that Princess Chu or his concubines might bear. The former emperor himself feared death. He lived in the same house as his princess, and they set up a stove next to their bed, cooking their own meals (to try to prevent poisoning), and the princess herself paid for the material of the meals. The assassins that Liu Yu sent had little chance to poison him. However, in fall 421, Liu Yu sent Chu Danzhi and Chu Yuzhi to meet Princess Chu, and as they gathered in another house, assassins Liu Yu sent jumped into the prince's residence and try to force him to take poison. The former emperor refused, stating that Buddhist doctrines prohibited suicide and that those who committed suicide could not receive human bodies in the next reincarnation. The assassins therefore used a blanket to cover his head and asphyxiated him.

Little is known about Princess Chu's life after her husband's death. Liu Yu had her adopt a son Sima Yuanyu, presumably another member of the imperial Sima household, to inherit the title of Prince of Lingling, but Yuanyu's identity is otherwise unknown. After the adoption, she became known as the Princess Dowager of Lingling (零陵王太妃). Her daughter Sima Maoying married Liu Yu's crown prince Liu Yifu, and after Liu Yu died in 422, Liu Yifu became emperor (as Emperor Shao) and created Sima Maoying empress, although Liu Yifu was himself removed and killed in 424 by imperial officials dissatisfied with his abilities to govern, and Empress Sima was demoted to being Princess of Yingyang. The former Jin empress died in August 436 and was buried with imperial honors with her husband Emperor Gong.

== Notes ==
Chinese royalty
Preceded by Empress Wang Shen'ai	Empress of Jin Dynasty (266–420); 419–420	Succeeded by None (dynasty destroyed)
Preceded by Empress Wang Shen'ai	Empress of China (Southern); 419–420	Succeeded by Empress Sima Maoying of Liu Song
Preceded by Yao Hong's empress of Later Qin	Empress of China (Henan); 419–420	Succeeded by Empress Sima Maoying of Liu Song
