= Wang Zhen'e =

- 王鎮惡
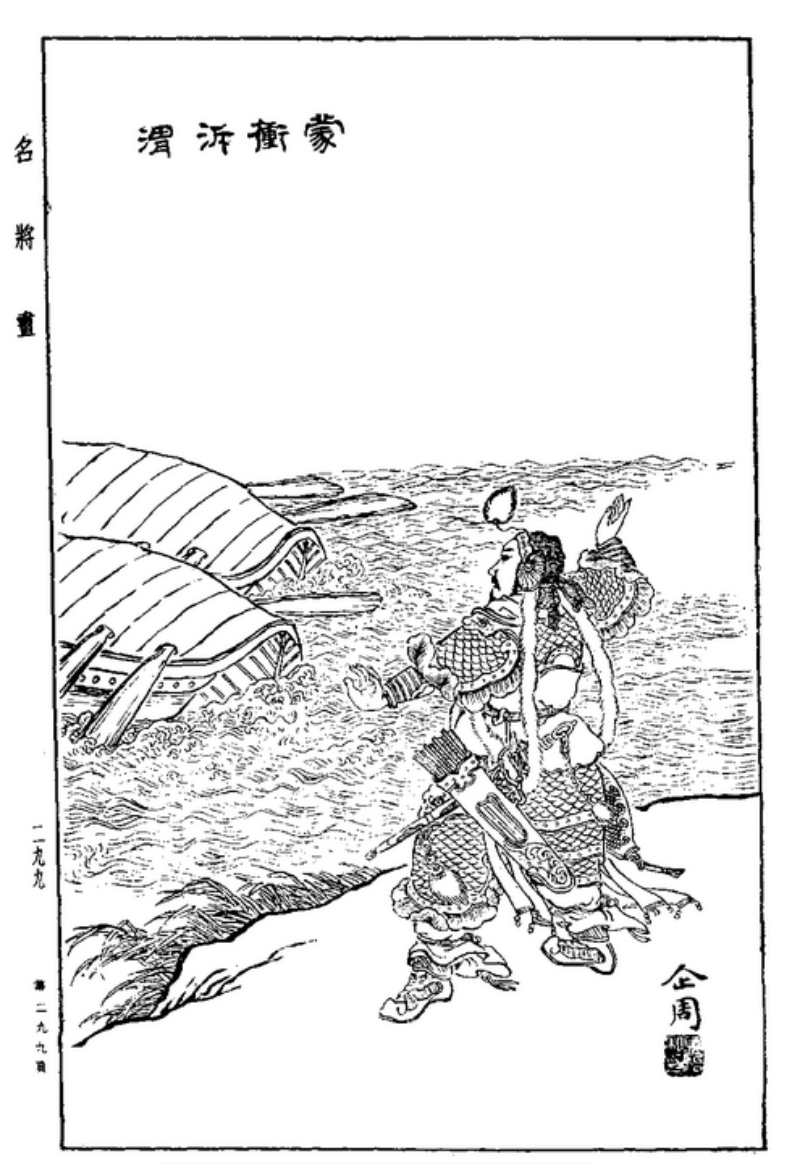

General Who Attacks Barbarians (征虜將軍)
- In office 417–418
- Monarch: Emperor An of Jin

Personal details
- Born: 11 June 373
- Died: 3 March 418 Xi'an, Shaanxi
- Children: Wang Lingfu; Wang Wei
- Parent: Wang Xiu
- Peerage: Marquis of Longyang County (龍陽縣侯)
- Posthumous name: Zhuang (壯)

Wang Zhen'e (11 June 373 – 7 March 418) was a military general of the Jin dynasty (266–420). The grandson of the Former Qin prime minister, Wang Meng, his family fled south to the Eastern Jin, where Wang Zhen'e was later recruited by the commander and future Emperor Wu of Song, Liu Yu. Wang distinguished himself in the campaigns against Lu Xun and Liu Yi, but he is best known for his role in the northern expedition against the Later Qin, during which he forced the last ruler of Qin, Yao Hong into surrender and briefly reclaimed the ancient capital of Chang'an for the Jin. Though often considered as the most talented among Liu Yu's military cabinet, Wang also had an avaricious character and was suspected of harbouring imperial ambitions. In 418, while guarding the Guanzhong region from the Helian Xia dynasty, he was assassinated by his fellow general, Shen Tianzi.

== Early life ==
Wang Zhen'e was born on 11 June 373 and was the grandson of the Former Qin prime minister, Wang Meng through his father Wang Xiu (王休). His birth date, which was the fifth day of the fifth month in the Chinese calendar, was seen as ominous according to the customs of his time, so his parents considered giving him off to a distant relative. However, Wang Meng intervened and stated, "This is no ordinary child. In the past, Lord Mengchang was born on an inauspicious date, and he became the Prime Minister of Qi. This child will bring prosperity to our family." Thus, the family kept him and gave him the name "Zhen'e", which means "to ward off evil".

In 386, when Wang Zhen'e was thirteen years old, the Former Qin was in collapse, and his homeland in the Guanzhong region was in a state of war. He was displaced for some time, wandering around the Xiao Mountains and Mianchi region before following his uncle, Wang Yao (王曜) to surrender to the Eastern Jin and live in Jing province. The young Wang enjoyed reading military treatises as well as discussing military and national affairs. Though he was not adept at horse riding and archery, he was described as decisive and possessing a mind for strategy.

== Service under Liu Yu ==
=== Joining Liu Yu ===
In 409, the Eastern Jin commander, Liu Yu was carrying out his first northern expedition against the Southern Yan. As his forces laid siege to the Yan capital at Guanggu (廣固, in modern Qingzhou, Shandong), Liu Yu was recommended by someone to Wang Zhen'e, who was serving as the Magistrate of Linli at the time. Liu Yu summoned Wang, and after talking to him, Liu was so impressed that he allowed Wang to stay overnight at his camp. The next morning, Liu Yu told his subordinates, "Wang Zhen'e is the grandson of Wang Meng. A family of generals have produced another general." He immediately appointed Wang as his Chief Clerk. When the army returned south, Wang fought and won several battles against the rebel, Lu Xun at Chapu (查浦; in present-day Jiangning, Jiangsu). For his contributions, he was enfeoffed as a fifth-class Viscount of Bolu County.

=== Battle of Jiangling (412) ===
With the Southern Yan and Lu Xun vanquished, Liu Yu sought to eliminate his internal rival, Liu Yi, who commanded one of the three main forces of the elite Beifu Army. In 412, Liu Yi was appointed the Inspector of Jing province, and Liu Yu soon began making his move. Wang Zhen'e supported his superior's plans, volunteering to lead the vanguard ships in their campaign. When Liu Yi arrived at the Jing provincial capital, Jiangling later that year, he suddenly fell ill and petitioned for his cousin, the Inspector of Yan province, Liu Fan (劉藩) to serve as his deputy. Liu Yu pretended to agree, but when Liu Fan stopped by the Jin capital, Jiankang along the way, he accused Liu Fan and his cousin of treason before forcing him to commit suicide.

As Liu Yu set out on his campaign, he appointed Wang Zhen'e as his Army Advisor and General Who Inspires Might. When they reached Gushu, Liu Yu dispatched Wang Zhen'e and Kuai En to lead the vanguard with a hundred warships. Wang's detachment traveled day and night, and after four days, he reached Yuzhangkou (豫章口; southeast of present-day Jiangling County, Hubei), just a few miles away from Jiangling.

Wang left his ships at Yuzhangkou and set off to Jiangling on foot, with Kuai En leading the front while he followed closely behind. He also assigned one or two people for each ship to guard the shores. The ship flags were raised facing the shore, and a drum was placed under each flag. Wang instructed the ship guards to continuously beat the drums once the main forces reach the city to give the illusion of a bigger army. To cut off Liu Yi's retreat, Wang sent a few of his men to burn Liu Yi's ships at Jiang Crossing (江津; south of present-day Jingzhou, Hubei). Finally, Liu Yi instructed the vanguard to identify as Liu Fan's men if they were questioned along the way.

Wang and Kuai's soldiers marched almost unimpeded, as the local garrison and people all assumed that Liu Fan had arrived. It was not until they were a few miles away from Jiangling when their cover was blown by Liu Yi's general, Zhu Xianzhi (朱顯之), who went to look for Liu Fan at the rear only to find smoke arising from Jiang Crossing. However, Zhu only had a few men with him, and before he could warn Liu Yi and close the city gates, Wang's soldiers had already stormed into Jiangling. By late afternoon, Wang and Kuai's forces had routed most of city garrison. Liu Yi continued to resist with his eastern army, who rightly assumed that Liu Yu was not in the city. Wang was aware that some of his own soldiers were relatives of Liu Yi's men, so he encouraged them to converse with the enemy and spread a rumour that Liu Yu had arrived. Falling for their ruse, Liu Yi's army lost spirit, and by the first watch of the night, they collapsed, leaving Liu Yi with only his personal soldiers.

Wang Zhen'e was worried that fighting into the night would cause confusion among his army, so he instead led them out of the city to lay an ambush for Liu Yi in the south. Liu Yi saw through his trap, and after some fighting, he was able to break out the city through the eastern gate. However, after arriving at the Niumu Buddhist Temple (牛牧佛寺; north of Jiangling), he committed suicide by hanging. With Liu Yi eliminated and Jiangling captured, Liu Yu rewarded Wang Zhen'e by appointing him General Who Stabilises Distant Lands and Interior Minister of Wuling. He was also enfeoffed the Viscount of Hanshou County.

=== Campaign against Sima Xiuzhi ===
In 415, a Man tribal leader, Xiang Bodigen (向博抵根) occupied Ruantou (阮頭; location unknown) and refused to submit to the Eastern Jin. Wang Zhen'e led his army to attack him and received reinforcements from the Inspector of Jing province, Sima Xiuzhi through his general Zhu Xiang (朱襄). Wang was first to arrive at Ruantou, but by then, he was given news that Liu Yu had publicly denounced Sima Xiuzhi and was carrying out a western expedition against him. Flanked by Xiang Bodigen and Zhu Xiang, Wang swiftly led his army east overnight through the coursing rivers, occupying the base of the local commandant, where he had the waterways blocked with bamboo cages filled with stones. As Zhu Xiang's ships came to a stop in the area, Wang's soldiers ambushed them from both sides of the banks, killing him along with over a thousand men.

After routing Zhu Xiang, Wang displayed his greedy side by taking the opportunity to plunder the local non-Chinese tribes instead of joining Liu Yu's forces against Sima Xiuzhi at the scheduled time. By the time he rejoined the main army at Jiangling, Sima had already been defeated. A few of Liu Yu's generals were killed in the campaign, including a certain Shen Yuanzi (沈淵子), and Liu was furious by Wang's tardiness. He later summoned Wang for questioning, but Wang was able to eloquently explain his actions, causing Liu's anger to subside. As Sima Xiuzhi and his ally, Lu Zongzhi fled to Xiangyang, Wang was instructed to lead Kuai En and the others to pursue them by water. However, Sima managed to cross the border into the Later Qin, and so Wang had no choice but to turn back. After the campaign, Wang was appointed as Guerilla General.

=== Northern Expedition against Later Qin ===
In 416, Liu Yu, encouraged by the upheaval in the Later Qin, prepared his army for a second northern expedition. Wang Zhen'e was appointed as Prancing Dragon General and was instructed to lead the vanguard. Before leaving, the official, Liu Muzhi, met with Wang and told him, "In the past, King Wen of Jin (Sima Zhao) entrusted the Shu region to Deng Ai, and now you are entrusted with the Guanzhong. We all hope for your success; do not let this opportunity slip away." Wang replied, "If I fail to reclaim Xianyang, then I vow to never cross the Yangzte and return!"

Liu Yu's forces invaded the Later Qin through five routes, with Wang Zhen'e and Tan Daoji leading infantry as the vanguard from the Huai and Fei (淝水; around present-day Lu'an, Anhui) regions through Xuchang and Luoyang. Wang and Tan's detachment entered Later Qin territory and won every battle they fought. Within a month, both Xuchang and Luoyang were captured by their forces.

Early on, Liu Yu had instructed the vanguard to wait for the main army once they reached Luoyang. However, with the Later Qin in disarray and the strategic Tong Pass left undefended, Wang decided to push on without the main army and attacked Tong Gate. Despite his early observations, Wang encountered stiff resistance from the Qin general, Yao Shao, who fortified the area with deep trenches and high walls. Wang's smaller army quickly found themselves isolated and running low of supplies. Wang urgently requested Liu Yu for grain and reinforcements, but at the time, Liu Yu's army was being held up by Northern Wei army along the Yellow River. In the end, Wang personally went to Hongnong to collect taxes from the local, who happily agreed to replenish his army supplies. Yao Shao tried several times to cut off his supplies, but was defeated by the Jin general, Shen Linzi, after which he died of illness.

When Liu Yu's army finally reached Tong Pass, Wang Zhen'e asked for permission to lead the navy from the Yellow River into the Wei River for an assault on the Qin capital, Chang'an, which Liu Yu permitted. At the time, the Qin general, Yao Nan (姚難) was returning to Chang'an from Xiangcheng. Wang Zhen'e pursued him, enticing the Qin emperor, Yao Hong to lead his troops to Shiqiao (石橋; northeast of present-day Xi'an, Shaanxi) as reinforcements. Another Qin general, Yao Qiang (姚彊), also led his forces to reinforce Yao Nan, and together they fought at Jingshang (涇上; northeast of present-day Xianyang, Shaanxi). Wang Zhen'e dispatched Mao Dezu to fight them, and his forces killed Yao Qiang while forcing Yao Nan to flee back to Chang'an.

Wang's fleet then entered the Wei River and sailed upstream. His fleet consisted of paddle-wheel ships; the crewmates propelled through the water by treading on the wheels built onto the ships, all while safely concealed inside their cabins. The Qin people were shocked when they saw these ships seemingly moving without a crew, which made them believe that divine intervention was at work. On 19 September 417, the fleet reached Weiqiao (渭橋; in present-day Weiyang, Shaanxi), where Wang ordered his troops to eat before disembarking fully armed, threatening to execute the last person to land.

At the time, Yao Hong still had tens of thousands of men under him. After a rallying speech, Wang led his men to charge against the Qin forces guarding the Weiqiao. Yao Hong attempted to reinforce the commanding general, Yao Pi (姚丕), but by the time he arrived, Wang had already won, and Yao Pi's men trampled on the relief force in their retreat. As the Qin army collapsed, Yao Hong fled back to his palace on horseback, and Wang soon entered Chang'an.

The following day, Yao Hong, along with his empress and officials, all went out to Wang Zhen'e's camp to surrender. Wang apprehended them and handed them over to his superiors. He then comforted the Han Chinese and non-Han tribes in Chang'an and allowed them to carry on with their daily lives. When Liu Yu arrived in Chang'an, Wang Zhen'e greeted him at the dam. Liu was very pleased by Wang's accomplishments, comparing him to the Eastern Han general, Feng Yi.

However, Wang once again showed his greed when he secretly opened and looted the Later Qin treasury. Liu Yu initially turned a blind eye to Wang's crimes and did not pursue the matter further, but he became concerned when he heard an accusation that Wang had taken Yao Hong's imperial carriage and was plotting a rebellion. Liu Yu sent his men to investigate, and though Wang had indeed stolen the carriage, he had simply stripped the carriage of its gold, silver and jewels before abandoning it over a wall. Relieved, Liu Yu left Wang unpunished and promoted him to General Who Attacks Barbarians for his merits.

== Death and posthumous honours ==
Later that year, Liu Yu received news that Liu Muzhi had died back at Jiankang. Fearing that the court will rebel in his absence, Liu Yu withdrew his troops from the Guanzhong, placing his 11-year-old son, Liu Yizhen in charge of guarding the region with Wang Zhen'e serving as his military aide. Many of Wang's southern peers were jealous and suspicious of him; in addition to recapturing Chang'an, the people of the Guanzhong region all respected Wang due to his grandfather, Wang Meng. The general and a younger brother of Shen Yuanzi, Shen Tianzi, was also competing with Wang for credit, as he considered his victory against the Qin forces at Yaoliu (堯柳; in present-day Baoji, Shaanxi) to be just as decisive. Shen and Fu Hongzhi warned Liu Yu, "Wang Zhen'e's family are natives of the Guanzhong; they cannot be trusted." Liu Yu replied, "I leave you, the military and civil officials with ten thousand of my elite troops. If he were to cause trouble, then he would be courting his own destruction, and that is that." Liu Yu also privately said to Shen Tianzi, "Zhong Hui was not much trouble because of Wei Guan. As the saying goes, "One fierce beast is no match to a pack of foxes." How can you, a dozen or so men, be afraid of Wang Zhen'e?" Liu Yu eventually left the Guanzhong at the end of the year.

In 418, the Guanzhong came under attack from the Helian Xia forces in the north. Shen Tianzi led his army to resist, but then stalled and retreated to Fort Liuhui (劉迴堡; around present-day Xingping, Shaanxi) as he feared the strength of the Xia army. He sent an envoy to Chang'an to report on the situation, during which Wang Zhen'e turned to his colleague, Wang Xiu and angrily criticized Shen's inaction. The envoy reported Wang's words to Shen, who despised Wang even more now. Wang Zhen'e led his reinforcements to aid Shen, but rumours began to circulate that Wang was plotting to kill the southern officers and soldiers in preparation for his rebellion. Finally, on 7 March, Shen invited Wang to Fu Hongzhi's camp for a secret meeting. After successfully persuading him to dismiss his attendants, Shen Tianzi and his kinsman, Shen Jingren (沈敬仁) assassinated Wang. Shen later claimed that he was acting under a secret order from Liu Yu, but he was soon killed by Wang Xiu as well. The Jin camp was thrown into disorder, allowing the Xia to quickly occupy the Guanzhong.

When he received news of Wang Zhen'e execution, Liu Yu submitted a memorial to Emperor An of Jin, stating that Shen Tianzi had "went mad" and had killed a "loyal servant". Wang was posthumously appointed General of the Left and Inspector of Qing province. After Liu Yu took the throne and established the Liu Song dynasty in 420, he posthumously conferred Wang Zhen'e the title of Marquis of Longyang and the name "Zhuang" (壯), and inscribed him along with others in the Ancestral Temple to be worshipped.
