= Chen Guinü =

Imperial consort during the Chinese Jin dynasty

Chen Guinü (simplified Chinese: 陈归女; traditional Chinese: 陳歸女; pinyin: Chén Guīnǚ; d. 390), posthumous name Empress Dowager Ande (Chinese: 安德皇太后; pinyin: Āndé Huángtàihòu; lit. 'the peaceful and virtuous empress dowager') was an imperial consort of the Chinese Eastern Jin dynasty. She was a concubine of Emperor Xiaowu and the mother of Emperor An and Emperor Gong.

== Life ==
Chen Guinü's father Chen Guang (陳廣) was initially a musician, but he later became a governmental official and reached the rank of commandery governor. Chen Guinü is a courtesan in the Jiaofang; she was regarded as beautiful and skilled in music. Chen Guinü was selected to be a concubine (with the rank of shuyuan) for Emperor Xiaowu. They had two sons—Sima Dezong the Crown Prince and Sima Dewen the Prince of Langye. She died in 390, still during Emperor Xiaowu's reign. After her developmentally disabled son Sima Dezong became emperor in 396 (as Emperor An), she was posthumously honored as an empress dowager, and she was worshiped in the same temple as Emperor Xiaowu's grandmother Consort Zheng Achun (鄭阿春).

== Media ==
- She is portrayed by Lu Qing in the 2017 television series General and I
