= Yao Hong's empress =

Yao Hong's empress (actual name unknown) (died 417) was the wife of Yao Hong, the last emperor of the Qiang-led Later Qin dynasty of China. Very little is known about her other than her existence—not even her name—and the fact that she was his empress. When he surrendered to Jin Dynasty (266–420) after attacks by the Jin general Liu Yu, she was delivered to the Jin capital Jiankang with him, where he was executed. Presumably, she was executed as well, as Liu Yu executed nearly all of the ruling class of the Later Qin state.

Chinese royalty
Preceded by Empress Qi	Empress of Later Qin; 416–417	Succeeded by None (dynasty destroyed)
Preceded by Empress Qi	Empress of China (Henan); 416	Succeeded by Empress Chu of Jin
Preceded by Empress Qi	Empress of China (Central Shaanxi); 416–417	Succeeded by Empress Liang of Xia
Preceded by Empress Qi	Empress of China (Eastern Gansu); 416	Succeeded by Empress Liang of Xia
