= Emperor An of Jin =

Emperor of Eastern Jin from 396 to 419

Emperor An of Jin 晉安帝
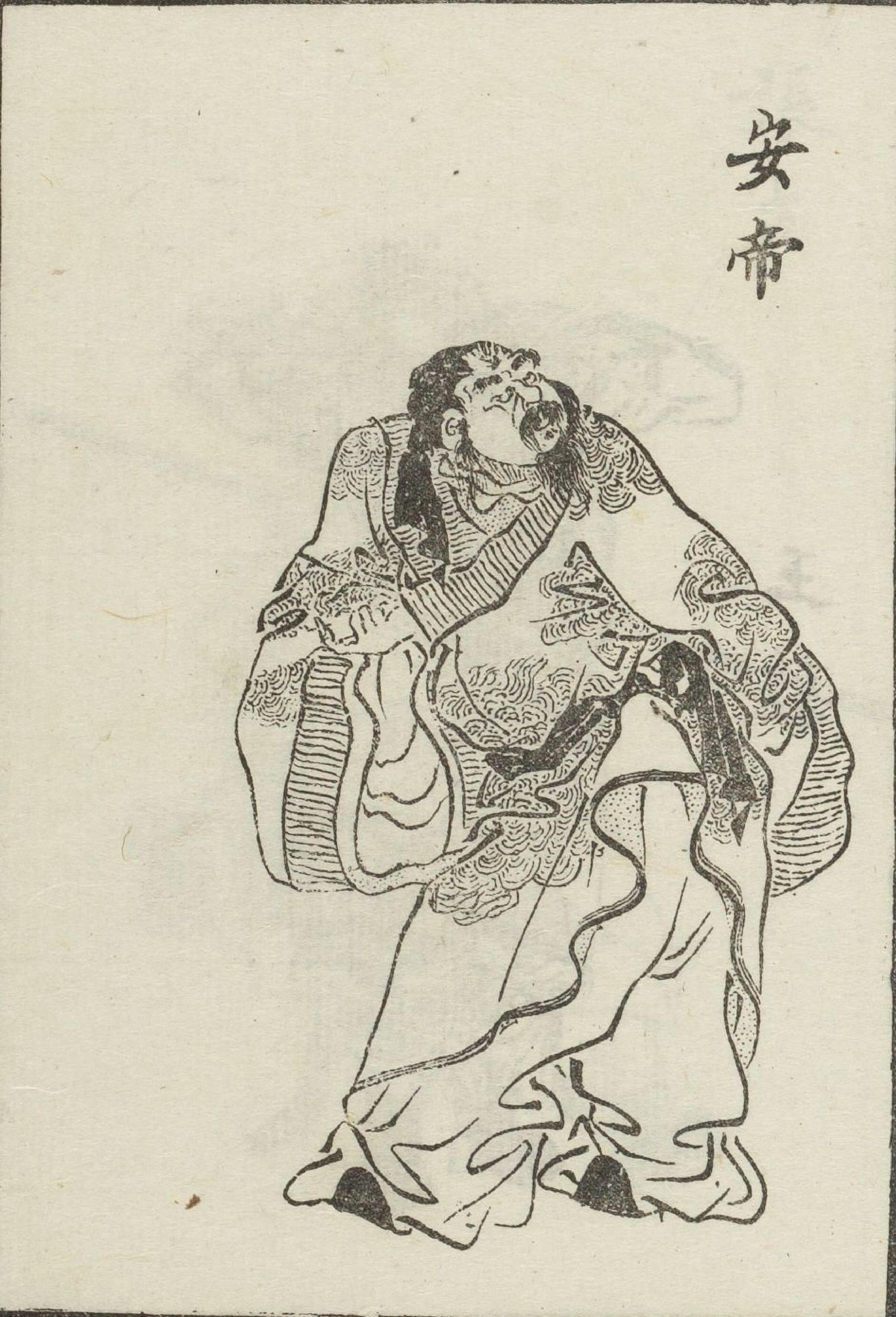

10th Emperor of the Eastern Jin dynasty
- Reign: 7 November 396 – 28 January 419
- Predecessor: Emperor Xiaowu
- Successor: Emperor Gong
- Born: 382
- Died: 28 January 419 (aged 37); Jiankang, Eastern Jin
- Burial: Xiuping ling (休平陵), Nanjing, Jiangsu
- Consorts: Empress Anxi
Full name
- Family name: Sīmǎ (司馬); Given name: Dezong (德宗, dézōng)
Era dates
- Longan (隆安): 397 – 402; Yuanxing (元興): 402 – 405; Yixi (義熙): 405 – 419
Posthumous name
- Emperor Ān 安皇帝
- House: House of Sima
- Dynasty: Eastern Jin
- Father: Emperor Xiaowu
- Mother: Empress Dowager Ande

Emperor An of Jin (simplified Chinese: 晋安帝; traditional Chinese: 晉安帝; pinyin: Jìn Ān Dì; Wade–Giles: Chin An-ti; 382 – 28 January 419), personal name Sima Dezong (司馬德宗), was an emperor of the Eastern Jin in China. He was described as so developmentally disabled that he was unable to speak properly, clothe himself, or be able to express whether he was hungry or full. He was created crown prince in 387 and ascended the throne in November 396. Because of his disability, the actual power was controlled by his uncle, Sima Daozi, Prince of Kuaiji. During his reign, regents and warlords dominated the Jin regime. Revolts by various governors also ravaged the land. From 398 to 403, there were constant revolts and civil war campaigns. In 403, the Jin regime was usurped by the warlord Huan Xuan, and while Emperor An was restored in 404, the Jin Dynasty was nearing its end. With the warlord Liu Yu as the actual power, Jin destroyed Southern Yan and Later Qin, greatly expanding its territory. However, with Liu Yu up in the north, the renegade governor of Guang Province (廣州, modern Guangdong and Guangxi), Lu Xun (卢循; descendant of Lu Zhi), rebelled and threatened the capital city Jiankang, before Liu Yu returned and crushed the revolt. In 419, Emperor An was strangled under the order of Liu Yu and replaced with his brother Emperor Gong, who would be the last emperor of the dynasty, before Liu Yu took the throne and establish the Liu Song dynasty.

== Early life ==
Sima Dezong was the oldest son of Emperor Xiaowu, born of his concubine Consort Chen Guinü in 382. It is not known when Sima Dezong's developmental disability became known, but it was likely very early in his childhood, for the degree of his disability, according to historians, was great. In 390, when he was just eight years old, his mother died. Even though he had a younger brother, Sima Dewen, born of Consort Chen as well (in 386), who was described to be intelligent and careful, and who learned to take care of him throughout the years, for reasons unknown, Emperor Xiaowu appeared to have never seriously considered making Sima Dewen his heir; on 16 September 387, Sima Dezong was created crown prince. In 395, he was set up in his own residence, the eastern palace, as was customary for crown princes. In 396, he married the daughter of the official Wang Xianzhi, Wang Shen'ai, as his crown princess.

In November 396, Emperor Xiaowu was killed by his concubine Honoured Lady Zhang, after offending her. However, with the emperor's only brother Sima Daozi, Prince of Kuaiji, being incompetent and Crown Prince Dezong being developmentally disabled, no investigation into Emperor Xiaowu's death was conducted. Crown Prince Dezong succeeded to the throne as Emperor An, and Sima Daozi became regent.

== Under Sima Daozi's regency ==
Sima Daozi, as regent, was constantly drunk and greatly trusted Wang Guobao and Wang Xu (王緒) because of their flattery, and his regency quickly developed a reputation for being corrupt and incompetent. The provincial governor, Wang Gong, whom Emperor Xiaowu entrusted with the armies of the northeastern part of the empire, considered starting a rebellion to overthrow Wang Guobao and Wang Xu. In 397, Wang Guobao and Wang Xu suggested to Sima Daozi that the armies that Wang Gong and another provincial governor, Yin Zhongkan (殷仲堪), were in charge of be reduced; Wang Gong and Yin, who was in command of the western provinces, in response, mobilized their forces and declared that Wang Guobao and Wang Xu should be executed. Sima Daozi, in fear, forced Wang Guobao to commit suicide and executed Wang Xu. Wang Gong and Yin then retreated. From this point on, Sima Daozi trusted no one but his teenage heir apparent, Sima Yuanxian, and entrusted the capital guards to Sima Yuanxian. He also gave military commands to his distant relatives Sima Shangzhi (司馬尚之) the Prince of Qiao and Sima Shangzhi's brother Sima Xiuzhi, as well as Wang Yu (王愉), in 398.

The giving of a military command to Wang Yu oddly drew a reaction from Wang Gong and Yin—as Wang Yu's command included four commanderies originally under the command of Yu Kai (庾楷; grandson of Yu Liang), who became angry and managed to persuade Wang Gong and Yin that Sima Daozi's intention was to act against them as well. They therefore rose again, but Sima Daozi was able to persuade Wang Gong's general Liu Laozhi (劉牢之), who was in command of the elite Beifu Forces (北府兵), to suddenly turn against Wang Gong, capturing and executing him. Yin, hearing of Wang Gong's death, was in fear but considered proceeding anyway—and Sima Daozi, under suggestion by Huan Xuan's cousin Huan Xiu (桓脩), managed to cause dissension between Yin and his generals Huan Xuan and Yang Quanqi (楊佺期) by offering Huan and Yang key posts; although Huan and Yang nominally remained Yin's allies, Yin was forced to withdraw his troops, and from that point on no longer posed a major threat, as his domain had now been divided into three, with Huan and Yang each given a third.

In late 398, the magician Sun Tai (孫泰), a friend of Sima Yuanxian's, who had gathered great following due to his magic, was exposed as planning a plot to take over the central government, and Sima Daozi ordered Sima Yuanxian to trap Sun Tai and execute him. Sun Tai's nephew Sun En fled to Zhoushan Island and planned revenge.

In summer 399, Sima Yuanxian, wanting even greater power, took an opportunity when his father was very drunk to have Emperor An issue an edict transferring Sima Daozi's authorities to Sima Yuanxian. When Sima Daozi awoke from his stupor, he was enraged, but after that point his power became extremely limited, even though he nominally remained regent.

== Under Sima Yuanxian's regency ==
Sima Yuanxian's regency was one in which he became surrounded by flatterers, and he began to have unrealistic ambitions of ending the threat that various provincial warlords posed to his rule. He greatly trusted the strategist Zhang Fashun (張法順), and also introduced many trusted associates into the administration. While he appeared to have some abilities, he also was, according to traditional historians, wasting the government's money in luxury and not paying attention to the burdens of the people. Late in 399, Sun En, seeing how the only province remaining under Jin imperial government's actual control—Yang Province (揚州, modern Zhejiang and southern Jiangsu) -- had been mismanaged by Sima Yuanxian, launched a major attack from Zhoushan Island, briefly taking over nearly all of Yang Province and advancing on the capital Jiankang (modern Nanjing, Jiangsu). Sun's rebellion was soon put down by Liu Laozhi, and Sun fled back to Zhoushan (but would remain a menace for several years), but Yang Province had been laid to waste. Despite this, Sima Yuanxian grew increasingly extravagant and arrogant.

In late 401, apprehensive of the growing power of Huan Xuan (who had in late 399 defeated and killed Yin Zhongkan and Yang Quanqi, seizing their domains and now controlled more than two thirds of Jin territory), Sima Yuanxian declared Huan a renegade and ordered an attack against Huan. However, he was largely dependent on Liu Laozhi's army, and Liu distrusted Sima Yuanxian. Meanwhile, Huan advanced east toward the capital and, after he made overtures to Liu, Liu turned against Sima Yuanxian. Jiankang fell to Huan, and Sima Yuanxian was captured and executed, along with all of his major associates. Huan also had Sima Daozi exiled and killed and became in full control of the empire. Not trusting of the treacherous Liu, Huan stripped him of his military command, and Liu tried to rebel again—but his own army officers were tired of repeated rebellions and deserted him, and he committed suicide.

== Takeover and usurpation by Huan Xuan ==
Huan Xuan initially tried to institute reforms of the imperial government, and the populace and governmental officials were pleased with changes he introduced, and he also tried to make peace with Sun En's brother-in-law Lu Xun (盧循), who replaced Sun En after Sun En committed suicide after a battlefield loss in 402, by offering Lu a commandery governorship. However, Huan Xuan soon took to living luxuriously and modifying laws at whim, and it was said that supplies to the imperial household were so reduced that even Emperor An almost suffered from hunger and cold.

In fall 403, Huan Xuan had Emperor An create him the Prince of Chu and give him the nine bestowments—both signs of an impending usurpation. In winter 403, Huan Xuan had Emperor An issue an edict (an edict that, according to traditional historians, Huan Xuan had Sima Bao (司馬寶) the Prince of Linchuan force Emperor An to personally write, although this account appears doubtful, as Emperor An's handicap makes it unlikely that he could personally write this edict) giving the throne to Huan Xuan. Huan then took the throne as emperor of a new Chu state. He created Emperor An as the Prince of Pinggu, but kept the emperor and his brother Sima Dewen the Prince of Langya (now reduced in rank to Duke of Shiyang) under virtual house arrest.

In spring 404, Huan Xuan's general Liu Yu, seeing that Huan Xuan lacked actual talent or popular support, led an uprising of a coalition of generals against him, starting the uprising at Jingkou (京口, in modern Zhenjiang, Jiangsu) and reaching Jiankang within a few days. Huan Xuan fled, but took Emperor An and Sima Dewen with him, back to his old power base Jiangling (江陵, in modern Jingzhou, Hubei). Liu Yu declared the restoration of Jin, and by summer 404, forces under his confederates Liu Yi (劉毅), He Wuji (何無忌; Liu Laozhi's nephew), and his brother Liu Daogui (劉道規) had reached the vicinity of Jiangling and defeated Huan Xuan's troops. Huan Xuan tried to flee again, but was killed by forces of the general Mao Qu (毛璩). Emperor An was declared to be restored at Jiangling by the officials Wang Kangchan (王康產) and Wang Tengzhi (王騰之). However, Huan Xuan's nephew Huan Zhen (桓振) soon surprised Wang Kangchan and Wang Tengzhi and captured Jiangling, taking Emperor An hostage, although ostensibly honoring him as the emperor. In spring 405, Jiangling fell to Liu Yi's forces, and Huan Zhen fled. Emperor An was welcomed back to Jiankang, but at this point on, Liu Yu was largely in control of the situation.

== Under Liu Yu's regency ==
=== Early years ===
Liu Yu, although he had ambitions to be emperor, learned from Huan Xuan's failures that he could not act too quickly, but must establish his authority through further victories first, particularly since because he led a coalition of generals and officials with different agendas in his victory over Huan. He therefore proceeded cautiously, initially sharing power with He Wuji and Liu Yi, among others. For the next few years, he also made several offers to resign his posts, judging correctly that the imperial officials would not dare to accept them, to further establish the image that he was indispensable.

In spring 405, Mao Qu's soldiers, from Yi Province (modern Sichuan and Chongqing), unhappy that Mao sent them on long-distance campaigns initially against Huan Xuan and then against Huan Zhen, rebelled, supporting the military officer Qiao Zong as their leader. They defeated and killed Mao and captured Chengdu (成都, in modern Chengdu, Sichuan), and Qiao Zong established his independent Western Shu state there.

Also in 405, Lu Xun, who had in 404 marched south and captured Panyu (番禺, in modern Guangzhou, Guangdong) during the wars relating to Huan Xuan, offered peace to the imperial government by paying a tribute. Liu Yu, believing that he had no abilities to defeat Lu by this point, made Lu the governor of Guang Province (廣州, modern Guangdong and Guangxi) and Lu's brother-in-law and lieutenant Xu Daofu (徐道覆) the governor of Shixing Principality (始興, roughly modern Shaoguan, Guangdong).

In 407, Liu Yu commissioned his friend Liu Jingxuan (劉敬宣, Liu Laozhi's son) to launch a major attack on Qiao Zong's Western Shu, but in 408, Liu Jingxuan's forces became stalled against the Western Shu general Qiao Daofu (譙道福) and was forced to retreat when food supplies ran out.

=== Campaigns against Southern Yan and Lu Xun ===
In 409, the Southern Yan emperor Murong Chao began a campaign of attacking and pillaging the Jin northern borders, intending to capture men and women to be trained as musicians. In response, Liu Yu decided to launch a campaign to destroy Southern Yan, over the objections of most imperial officials, but was supported by one of Liu Yu's initial allies in starting the uprising against Huan Xuan, Meng Chang (孟昶). While Liu Yu was quickly able to defeat Southern Yan main forces in late 409 and put the Southern Yan capital Guanggu (廣固, in modern Qingzhou, Shandong) under siege, Guanggu did not fall quickly. While Liu Yu was sieging Guanggu, Xu Daofu persuaded a reluctant Lu Xun (who was afraid of a confrontation with Liu Yu) to attack north, reasoning that eventually when Liu Yu was ready, Liu Yu would attack first, and that with Liu Yu sieging Guanggu, they could capture the rest of the empire together.

In spring 410, Liu Yu, captured Guanggu, ending Southern Yan, and considered further readying a campaign against Later Qin, was informed that Lu and Xu were attacking north, and therefore quickly returned south toward Jiankang. Meanwhile, He Wuji led a fleet against Xu at Yuzhang (豫章, in modern Nanchang, Jiangxi), but was defeated and killed by Xu. A second force commanded by Liu Yi was also defeated by Xu and Lu. However, Liu Yi's captured soldiers informed Lu that Liu Yu was on his way back to Jiankang, and Lu, intimidated, considered ending his campaign, but continued to Jiankang at Xu's insistence. A number of imperial officials, including Meng, suggested that Emperor An be taken across the Yangtze River to evade Lu's forces, but Liu Yu refused, choosing to defend Jiankang.

Once at Jiankang, Lu refused several strategies that Xu offered that were risky but offered chances of success, instead trying to intimidate Liu Yu's forces into collapsing, which he could not do. Soon he ran out of food supplies and withdrew to Xunyang (尋陽, in modern Jiujiang, Jiangxi). Liu Yu gave chase, but also ordered his generals Sun Chu (孫處) and Shen Tianzi (沈田子) to take a fleet by sea to attack Panyu, fully confident that he can defeat Lu and make it impossible for Lu to then retreat to his home base. Meanwhile, Xu attacked Jing Province (荊州, modern Hubei and Hunan), but was defeated by Liu Yu's brother Liu Daogui (劉道規), and rejoined Lu, preparing for a confrontation with Liu Yu. Around the new year 411, they engaged Liu Yu at Dalei (大雷, in modern Anqing, Anhui), but Liu Yu destroyed their fleet with fire. Lu and Xu fled toward Panyu, which had however been captured by Sun at this point. Lu put Panyu under siege, but Shen, who was then trying to capture other commanderies, returned to Panyu and defeated Lu along with Sun. Lu fled toward Jiao Province (交州, modern northern Vietnam). The governor of Jiao Province, Du Huidu (杜慧度), defeated Lu, and Lu killed his wife and concubines, and then committed suicide by jumping into a river.

=== Campaigns against Western Shu and Later Qin ===
With the state having been stabilized after Lu Xun's destruction, Liu Yu again turned his attention outward, hoping to use military victories to propel himself into sufficiently high public standing that he can take the throne for himself. At the same time, however, he began to remove members of his coalition who stood or might stand in his way. In 412, believing that Liu Yi, then governor of Jing Province, was about to act against him along with Liu Yi's cousin Liu Fan (劉藩) the governor of Yan Province (兗州, then modern central Jiangsu), he arrested Liu Fan and his friend Xie Hun (謝混), and then made a surprise attack against Liu Yi, defeating Liu Yi's forces easily. Liu Yi was killed in flight. In 413, Liu Yu also surprised and killed his assistant, the general Zhuge Zhangmin (諸葛長民), whom he suspected of considering to act against him when he was away from Jiankang attacking Liu Yi.

Meanwhile, in late 412, Liu Yu commissioned the general Zhu Lingshi to attack Qiao Zong's Western Shu, secretly instructing him to take the long route to Qiao Zong's capital Chengdu by Min River (岷江), rather than the short route by Fu River (涪江). Zhu's forces were able to surprise Qiao Zong's main general Qiao Daofu and Qiao Zong himself, capturing Chengdu in 413 and annexing Western Shu back into Jin.

In 414, Liu Yu began to suspect Liu Yi's replacement as the governor of Jing Province, Sima Xiuzhi (司馬休之), who was a member of the imperial clan and whose son Sima Wensi (司馬文思) had been created the Prince of Qiao and had gathered many adventurers around him. In spring 414, Liu Yu had Sima Wensi's confederates arrested and executed, while delivering Sima Wensi to Sima Xiuzhi, intending for Sima Xiuzhi to show submission by executing Sima Wensi himself. Instead, Sima Xiuzhi only requested that Sima Wensi's princely title be stripped. In spring 415, Liu Yu arrested another son of Sima Xiuzhi, Sima Wenbao (司馬文寶), and Sima Xiuzhi's nephew Sima Wenzu (司馬文祖), ordering the two to commit suicide, and then launched an attack on Sima Xiuzhi, who was joined by Lu Zongzhi (魯宗之) the governor of Yong Province (雍州, then modern northwestern Hubei). Initially, Sima Xiuzhi and Lu Zongzhi enjoyed some successes, defeating Liu Yu's son-in-law Xu Kuizhi (徐逵之), but after Liu Yu himself arrived, he defeated Sima Xiuzhi's forces, capturing Jiangling and forcing Sima Xiuzhi and Lu Zongzhi to flee to Later Qin. Liu Yu now no longer had significant opposition in Jin.

In 416, Liu Yu launched a major attack against Later Qin, in light of the recent death of the Later Qin emperor Yao Xing, entrusting the capital to his assistant Liu Muzhi, with his teenage heir apparent Liu Yifu being nominally in charge. In winter 416, the important city Luoyang fell to Liu Yu's general Tan Daoji. In light of Luoyang's fall, Liu Yu had Emperor An create him Duke of Song and bestow him the nine bestowments, showing his intentions to take the throne eventually, although he declined both honors at that point.

In spring 417, Tan Daoji and another general, Shen Linzi, engaged in a major campaign with Later Qin's most prominent general, Yao Shao (姚紹) the Duke of Lu, the uncle of the emperor Yao Hong. After a month of battles, Yao Shao was defeated, and he died in anger. With Yao Shao dead, the other Later Qin generals could not resist Jin forces. Liu Yu's fleet, commanded by Wang Zhen'e (Wang Meng's grandson), advanced quickly, while Yao Hong tried to first destroy Liu Yu's flank forces, commanded by Shen Linzi's brother Shen Tianzi. Despite Yao Hong's large advantage in numbers, Shen Tianzi crushed him, forcing him to flee back to his capital Chang'an. Wang Zhen'e's fleet then arrived and defeated Later Qin's final resistance, entering Chang'an. Yao Hong surrendered, and Liu Yu had him delivered to Jiankang and executed, ending Later Qin.

=== Emperor An's death ===
With Later Qin destroyed, there was an expectation that Liu Yu would next advance northwest and either destroy or force the subjugation of the several states in the northwest still—Xia, Western Qin, Northern Liang, and Western Liang. Indeed, at this point, Western Qin's prince Qifu Chipan, Northern Liang's prince Juqu Mengxun, and Western Liang's prince Li Gao were all sufficiently intimidated that they nominally submitted to Jin's authority. However, Liu Muzhi then died at this time, and Liu Yu, intending on taking the throne, decided to return to Jiankang himself, leaving his 11-year-old son Liu Yizhen (劉義真) and the generals Wang Zhen'e, Shen Tianzi, Mao Dezu (毛德祖), and the official Wang Xiu (王脩) in charge of Chang'an.

With Liu Yu having left Chang'an, Xia's emperor Helian Bobo was intent on taking Chang'an himself. He had his sons Helian Gui (赫連璝) and Helian Chang, along with his general Wang Maide (王買德) make a three-pronged advance toward Chang'an while cutting off the supply route between Luoyang and Chang'an. Meanwhile, with Wang Zhen'e and Shen Tianzi being previously envious of each other, Shen Tianzi suspected Wang Zhen'e of being on the verge of rebellion, and decided to have him killed. Wang Xiu then executed Shen Tianzi, but then Liu Yizhen believed the accusations that Wang Zhen'e was in fact about to rebel and that Wang Xiu was ready to as well, and so executed Wang Xiu. Once Wang Xiu was executed, Liu Yizhen himself was without supervision, and he, in fear of Xia forces, withdrew all of his forces inside Chang'an, and Xia forces then sieged the city. Liu Yu, hearing this, sent Zhu Lingshi to replace Liu Yizhen and ordered Liu Yizhen to withdraw. Liu Yizhen's forces, however, having pillaged Chang'an, could not withdraw quickly, and they were crushed by Xia forces at Qingni (青泥, in modern Xi'an, Shaanxi), with nearly the entire army killed or captured. Liu Yizhen barely escaped with his life, and the Chang'an region became Xia possession, although Jin retained the Luoyang region.

Liu Yu, after accepting the Duke of Song title and the nine bestowments in summer 418, had Emperor An offer to create him as the Prince of Song, but went on to publicly decline it. Meanwhile, he became convinced of the truth of a prophecy that stated, "There will be two more emperors after Changming." (Changming, which meant "dawn", was the courtesy name of Emperor An's father Emperor Xiaowu.) He therefore became resolved to kill Emperor An, and he tried several times to have Emperor An's servants poison him, but because Emperor An's brother Sima Dewen continuously attended to him, the servants had no chance to poison him. However, around the new year 419, Sima Dewen was himself ill and had to be at his house. Liu Yu's assassin Wang Shaozhi (王韶之) then took the opportunity to kill Emperor An—according to Zizhi Tongjian, by twisting clothes into a rope and then using it to strangle Emperor An. Liu Yu then made Sima Dewen emperor (as Emperor Gong).

== Era names ==
- Longan (隆安, lóng ān): 13 February 397 – 17 February 402
- Yuanxing (元興, yuán xīng): 18 February 402 – 1 March 405
- Yixi (義熙, yì xī): 2 March 405 – 11 February 419

== Consorts ==
- Empress Anxi, of the Wang clan of Langya (安僖皇后 琊瑯王氏; 384–412), first cousin, personal name Shen'ai (神愛)

Emperor An of Jin House of Sima Born: 382 Died: 419
Regnal titles
| Preceded by Emperor Xiaowu of Jin | Emperor of China; Eastern Jin; 396–403 with Sima Daozi (396–399); Sima Yuanxian (399–402) | In abeyance Usurpation by Huan Xuan Title next held by Himself |
| Preceded by Emperor Xiaowu of Jin | Emperor of China; Eastern Jin; 396–403 with Sima Daozi (396–399); Sima Yuanxian (399–402) | Succeeded by Yao Xing |
| Preceded by Emperor Xiaowu of Jin | Emperor of China; Eastern Jin; 396–403 with Sima Daozi (396–399); Sima Yuanxian (399–402) | Succeeded by Murong De |
| In abeyance Huan Xuan defeated Title last held by Himself | Emperor of China; Eastern Jin; 404–419 with Liu Yu (404–419) | Succeeded by Emperor Gong of Jin |
| Preceded by Murong Chao | Emperor of China; Eastern Jin; 404–419 with Liu Yu (404–419) | Succeeded by Emperor Gong of Jin |
| Preceded by Yao Hong | Emperor of China; Eastern Jin; 404–419 with Liu Yu (404–419) | Succeeded by Helian Bobo |
