= Emperor Gong of Jin =

Emperor of the Eastern Jin dynasty from 419 to 420

Emperor Gong of Jin 晉恭帝

11th Emperor of the Eastern Jin dynasty
- Reign: 28 Jan 419 – 7 July 420
- Predecessor: Emperor An
- Born: 386
- Died: Oct or Nov 421 (aged 35); Jiankang, Liu Song
- Burial: Chongping ling (沖平陵), Nanjing, Jiangsu
- Consorts: Empress Gongsi
- Issue: Princess Haiyan; Princess Fuyang
Full name
- Family name: Sīmǎ (司馬); Given name: Dewen (德文, déwén)
Era dates
- Yuanxi (元熙): 419 – 420
Posthumous name
- Emperor Gōng 恭皇帝 (lit. "respectful")
- House: House of Sima
- Dynasty: Eastern Jin
- Father: Emperor Xiaowu
- Mother: Empress Dowager Ande

Emperor Gong of Jin (simplified Chinese: 晋恭帝; traditional Chinese: 晉恭帝; pinyin: Jìn Gōng Dì; Wade–Giles: Chin Kung-ti; 386 – October or November 421), personal name Sima Dewen (Chinese: 司馬德文; pinyin: Sīmǎ Déwén), was the last emperor of the Eastern Jin Dynasty (266–420) in China. He became emperor in January 419 after his developmentally disabled brother Emperor An was killed by the regent Liu Yu, and during his brief reign, actual power was in Liu Yu's hands. On 7 July 420, under pressure from Liu Yu, he yielded the throne to Liu Yu, ending Jin's existence. Liu Yu founded the Liu Song dynasty, and in October or November 421, believing that the former Jin emperor posed a threat to his rule, had him asphyxiated with a blanket.

== Early life ==
Sima Dewen was the second son of Emperor Xiaowu of Jin and his concubine Consort Chen Guinü in 386, four years after their oldest son, Sima Dezong. Contrary to his older brother who was described as being so developmentally disabled that he was unable to speak, clothe himself, or express whether he was hungry or full, Sima Dewen was described as an intelligent child. From childhood, he became accustomed to care for his brother, especially after their mother's death in 390. Their father did not have any other sons. Despite Sima Dezong's severe developmental disability, he was made crown prince in 387 at the age of five by Emperor Xiaowu. On 27 Dec 392, (Note: According to Sima Yao's biography in Book of Jin, Sima Dewen was made Prince of Langye on the gengyin day of the 11th month of the 17th year of the Taiyuan era of Yao's reign. This corresponds to 27 Dec 392 in the Julian calendar.) Emperor Xiaowu bestowed upon Sima Dewen the title of "Prince of Langye" – the second most prestigious title for a prince after "Crown Prince". In November 396, Emperor Xiaowu was strangled by his favorite concubine Honoured Lady Zhang after making an offensive remark about her age, and Sima Dezong succeeded the throne as Emperor An of Jin. Sima Dewen continued to care for his brother after the latter's ascension to the throne.

== During Emperor An's reign ==
Sometime during Emperor An's reign, Sima Dewen married his wife, Chu Lingyuan, who was from an aristocratic family. She had two daughters, Sima Maoying, later created the Princess Haiyan, and the later Princess Fuyang.

Throughout Emperor An's early reign, Sima Dewen received increasingly honorific offices, but had little actual power, as the power was initially in the hands of his uncle, the regent Sima Daozi the Prince of Kuaiji, and later in the hands of Sima Daozi's son Sima Yuanxian. The situation continued after Sima Yuanxian was overthrown by the warlord Huan Xuan in 402.

In 403, Huan Xuan forced Emperor An to yield the throne to him, temporarily ending Jin. Huan Xuan established a new state of Chu, and he created Emperor An the Prince of Pinggu (平固王) and Sima Dewen the Duke of Shiyang (石阳县公), but kept them close to him to watch them. In 404, however, a rebellion by the general Liu Yu quickly led to Huan Xuan's destruction and Emperor An's restoration. When, however, later that year Emperor An and Sima Dewen fell into the hands of Huan Xuan's nephew Huan Zhen (桓振), Huan Zhen considered executing Emperor An to avenge Huan Xuan's young son Huan Sheng (桓昇), who was killed by the rebels. It took great pleading on Sima Dewen's part, explaining that neither he nor Emperor An had had anything to do with Huan Sheng's death, for Huan Zhen to spare Emperor An. In early 405, Huan Zhen was defeated, and Emperor An and Sima Dewen returned to the capital Jiankang, but by this point power was in Liu Yu's hands, albeit in a power-sharing agreement with a number of allies whom he had had to recruit in his campaign against Huan Xuan.

As the years went by, Liu Yu gradually concentrated more and more power in his hands, destroying rivals including Liu Yi (劉毅), Zhuge Zhangmin (諸葛長民), and Sima Xiuzhi (司馬休之), while greatly showing his strength in campaigns destroying rival states Southern Yan, Western Shu, and Later Qin. Sima Dewen continued to be largely ceremonially honored but actually powerless during this period. In 416, during Liu Yu's campaign against Later Qin, Sima Dewen asked to undertake a mission in Luoyang, recently captured from Later Qin, to try to restore the imperial tombs of the early Jin emperors, but it is not known what came of the mission. He returned to Jiankang in 418 after Liu Yu destroyed Later Qin.

Late that year, Liu Yu, intending to seize the throne and believing a prophecy stating, "There will be two more emperors after Changming" (Note: Changming, which meant "dawn," was the courtesy name of Emperor Xiaowu.), became intent on killing Emperor An and replacing him with Sima Dewen. However, because Sima Dewen continuously attended to his brother, assassins whom Liu Yu sent to poison Emperor An did not have the opportunity to do so. However, around the new year 419, Sima Dewen was ill and had to be at his own house, and Liu Yu's assassin Wang Shaozhi (王韶之) took the opportunity to kill Emperor An. Liu Yu then declared Sima Dewen emperor, as Emperor Gong.

== Reign ==
Emperor Gong's reign was a brief and powerless one. He created his wife Princess Chu empress in spring 419. He also promoted Liu Yu, then carrying the title Duke of Song, to the Prince of Song, which Liu Yu initially declined but accepted in fall 419. In spring 420, Liu Yu, then at Shouyang sent his assistant Fu Liang to Jiankang to pressure Emperor Gong to yield the throne. Emperor Gong responded by summoning Liu Yu back to the capital in summer 419, and Fu then offered him a draft of an abdication edict, requesting that he write it personally. Sima Dewen did so, and then left the palace and went to his old house while he was Prince of Langya. Three (Note: 10 July 420 on the Julian calendar) days later, Liu Yu took the throne and established the Liu Song dynasty, ending Jin.

== After abdication ==
Liu Yu created Sima Dewen the Prince of Lingling and built a palace for him near Jiankang. He had the general Liu Zunkao (劉遵考), a distant cousin, lead a group of guards, ostensibly to protect the prince but instead to keep him under watch.

Soon, Liu Yu, still believing Sima Dewen to be a threat, sent Sima Dewen's former attendant Zhang Wei (張偉) a bottle of poisoned wine, ordering him to poison Sima Dewen. Zhang, not wanting to carry out the order, drank the wine himself and died. Meanwhile, however, in order to prevent any likelihood that Sima Dewen would have a male heir, Liu Yu ordered Princess Chu's brothers Chu Xiuzhi (褚秀之) and Chu Danzhi (褚淡之) to poison any male children whom Princess Chu or Sima Dewen's concubines would bear. Sima Dewen himself feared death greatly, and he and Princess Chu remained in the same house, cooking their own meals, with Princess Chu paying for the material herself. Assassins whom Liu Yu sent initially could find no chance to kill the former emperor.

In fall 421, Liu Yu sent Chu Danzhi and his brother Chu Yuzhi (褚裕之) to visit their sister. As Princess Chu came out to meet her brothers in a different house, soldiers sent by Liu Yu intruded into Sima Dewen's house and ordered him to take poison. He refused, stating that Buddhist doctrines prohibit suicide and that those who commit suicide could not be reborn as humans in their next lives. The assassins therefore used a blanket to cover his head and asphyxiated him. He was buried with imperial honors.

As for the title of "Prince of Lingling", it remained in the Sima clan until it was abolished by Emperor Wu of Liang in April 502, when he ascended the throne. The last known Prince of Lingling was Sima Yaoshi (司马药师), who died on 30 March 490.

== Era name ==
- Yuanxi (元熙, Yuánxī): 11 February 419 – 10 July 420

== Family ==
- Empress Gongsi, of the Chu clan of Henan (恭思皇后 河南褚氏; 384–436), personal name Lingyuan (靈媛)
  - Princess Haiyan (海鹽公主; 403–439), personal name Maoying (茂英), 1st daughter
    - Married Liu Yifu (406–424)
  - Princess Fuyang (富陽公主), 2nd daughter

== Notes ==
Emperor Gong of Jin House of Sima Born: 386 Died: 421
Regnal titles
Preceded by Emperor An of Jin	Emperor of China; Eastern Jin; 419–420 with Liu Yu (419–420)	Succeeded by Emperor Wu of Liu Song
Chinese royalty
Vacant Last known title holder: Liu Gao	Prince of Lingling; 420–421	Vacant Next known title holder: Li Jun
