= Shen Linzi =

- 沈林子

Military Consultant of the Western Garrison (鎮西諮議參軍)
- In office ?–?
- Monarch: Emperor Wu of Song

Personal details
- Born: 387 Huzhou, Zhejiang
- Died: 422
- Relations: Shen Yue (grandson)
- Children: Shen Shao; Shen Liang; Shen Pu
- Parent: Shen Mufu
- Courtesy name: Jingshi (敬士)
- Peerage: Count of Hanshou County (漢壽縣伯)
- Posthumous name: Huai (懷)

Shen Linzi (387–422), courtesy name Jingshi, was a military general of the Jin dynasty (266–420) and Liu Song dynasty during the Northern and Southern dynasties. An early follower of the Jin commander Liu Yu (Emperor Wu of Song), Shen served as his deputy and participated in several of his military campaigns, distinguishing himself against the Southern Yan, Lu Xun and Sima Xiuzhi. During the expedition against the Later Qin, he defeated the main Qin army under Yao Shao and saved the Jin forces at Tongguan from collapse. His merits made him a favourite of Liu Yu, but not long after the establishment of the Liu Song dynasty, he died of illness at the age of thirty-six. His grandson was the poet and historian, Shen Yue, who compiled his biography in the Book of Song.

== Early life and background ==
Shen Linzi was a member of the Shen clan of Wuxing. When the Taoist, Sun En led an uprising against the Eastern Jin in 399, his father, Shen Mufu (沈穆夫) joined the rebellion, but was captured and killed later that year. At the time, Shen Linzi's grandfather, Shen Jing (沈警), had a cousin named Shen Yu (沈預) who he depised for his immoral behaviour. Using Shen Mufu's involvement in the rebellion, Shen Yu reported Shen Jing to the authorities, and Shen Jing along with four of his other sons were executed. Shen Linzi and his brothers were able to escape to the mountains, living in secrecy to avoid persecution. He later built tombs for his father, grandfather and uncles.

In 400, Sun En led his followers to invade the Three Wu region (三吳; roughly present-day Zhejiang and Jiangsu). The Jin imperial army sent to repel him, led by Liu Laozhi and Gao Suzhi (高素之), allowed their soldiers to plunder the local populace, but only one unit, led by Liu Yu, maintained strict discipline and restrained themselves. Shen Linzi thus went over to Liu Yu to surrender. Impressed by their conversation, Liu Yu had Shen and his family moved to Jingkou, where they were provided with housing.

In 404, Shen Linzi accompanied Liu Yu in his campaign against the usurper, Huan Xuan. Following the recapture of the capital at Jiankang, Shen and his brothers returned to their hometown of Wuxing to get revenge against Shen Yu. During a festival, they broke into Shen Yu's house and slaughtered his entire family. They then presented Shen Yu's head before his father and grandfather's tombs.

== Service under Liu Yu ==
Later, Shen Linzi was repeatedly offered official positions under Liu Yu and another general, Liu Yi, but initially refused them all, believing that his clan had endured enough hardships. Eventually, after much urging, Liu Yu was able to convince Shen into serving him in 407, when Liu was appointed as the new Inspector of Yang province. Liu made Shen the Magistrate of Jianxi County, and enfeoffed him as a Fifth-rank Marquis of Zizhong County.

=== Campaigns against Southern Yan and Lu Xun ===
In 408, Shen Linzi followed Liu Yu in his northern expedition against the Southern Yan. When their armies fought at Linqu, the Yan elite Tiger Cavalry attacked the Jin army from the rear, but Shen was able to defeat them with elite troops of his own. After the Yan army retreated to their capital at Guanggu (廣固, in modern Qingzhou, Shandong), Liu Yu laid siege to the city during which Shen was tasked with attacking the western corner along with Liu Jingxuan.

Guanggu eventually fell in 409, and the Southern Yan was destroyed. However, while Liu Yu was away, the Inspector of Guang province, Lu Xun, launched a large-scale rebellion in the south and threatened to take Jiankang, prompting Liu Yu to rush back home to defend Shitou. When he reached the city, there was word from Lu Xun's camp that the rebels were planning to attack Jiankang through Baishi (白石; northeast of present-day Stone City, Jiangsu). Liu Yu therefore led his force to guard Baishi while leaving behind Shen Linzi and Xu Chite (徐赤特) to defend Chapu Fortress (查浦; south of present-day Qingliangshan Park, Jiangsu). Shen suspected that the assault through Baishi was a ruse and urged Liu Yu to be cautious. However, Liu believed that the defences of Shitou and the Qinhuai river were strong enough to hold out against the rebels and trusted Shen's judgement to see them through.

As Shen expected, the rebel army through Baishi was only composed of old and weak soldiers, while the main army was actually heading towards Danyang Commandery (丹陽郡; around present-day Xuancheng, Anhui) through Shitou. The rebels set fire to the fortifications at Shitou while laying an ambush on the south bank of the Qinhuai river. Shen ordered his soldiers to maintain their positions, but Xu Chite ignored him and sallied out to attack the rebels. As a result, Xu was ambushed, and Shen had to lead a counterattack to rescue his remaining troops. Eventually, Jin reinforcements under Zhu Lingshi arrived, and the imperial army at Shitou were able to repel Lu Xun. Xu was executed for his insubordination, while Shen was promoted to an Army Advisor of the Central Army.

=== Campaigns against Liu Yi and Sima Xiuzhi ===
When Liu Yu was later promoted to Grand Commandant, he transferred Shen Linzi under his command. In 412, Shen participated in Liu Yu's western expedition against Liu Yi in Jing province.

In 415, Liu Yu launched another western campaign in Jing province, this time against Sima Xiuzhi. During the campaign, a man named Guo Liangzhi (郭亮之) gathered the local tribes to occupy Wuling Commandery (武陵郡; around present-day Changde, Hunan), while the local administrator, Wang Zhen'e was away. Shen led his troops to quell the revolt, killing Guo. He then marched to Shicheng (石城; in present-day Zhongxiang, Hubei) and attacked Sima Xiuzhi's ally, Lu Gui. Together with Zhao Lunzhi (趙倫之), they breached the city and chased Lu Gui all the way to Xiangyang. Lu and Sima Xiuzhi were able to escape to the Later Qin dynasty in the north. With the pacification of Jing province, Shen was garrisoned at the provincial capital at Jiangling.

=== Northern expedition against Later Qin ===
In 416, after Liu Yu was promoted to General Who Pacifies the North, he appointed Shen Linzi as his Army Advisor. That same year, Liu Yu carried out his northern expedition against the Later Qin. He promoted Shen to General Who Builds Martial Might and assigned him to lead a naval force from the Bian river into the Yellow River. During the campaign, a native of Xiangyi (襄邑; present-day Sui County, Henan), Dong Shenhu (董神虎) surrendered to the Jin forces with a thousand followers. Liu Yu accepted him and sent him to attack Cangyuan (倉垣; northwest of present-day Kaifeng, Henan) with Shen Linzi. After capturing Cangyuan, however, Dong returned to Xiangyi without permission, so Shen had him killed and absorbed his followers.

In 417, Shen advanced to Jie County (解縣, in modern Yuncheng, Shanxi), where he scared away the Later Qin Administrator of Hebei, Xue Bo (薛帛) and captured his troops and provisions. Afterwards, he joined Tan Daoji in his assault against Puban (蒲阪, in also modern Yuncheng). At the time, the Jin division under Wang Zhen'e was struggling to capture Tongguan. As they were also unable to capture Puban, Shen suggested to Tan that they join forces with Wang at Tongguan. He agreed, and together, they drove away the main Qin commander, Yao Shao.

Soon, Shen led his elite troops in a successful night raid and killed the Qin general, Yao Luan (姚鸞), who was cutting off Jin supply lines. He then routed Yao Zan (姚讚), who was defending the Yellow River waterway, but was unable to defeat the Qin army at Dingcheng (定城; in present-day Tongguan County, Shaanxi). By this point, they were too deep in enemy territory, and the Jin army suffered from food shortages and morale loss. Shen's subordinates urged that they retreat and rejoin Liu Yu's main force, but Shen refused, believing that they were at the cusp of victory. Fortunately for them, Wang Zhen'e was able to convince the people of Hongnong Commandery to replenish their supplies. Yao Shao sent Yao Qia (姚洽), An Luan (安鸞), Yao Moli (姚墨蠡) and Tang Xiaofang (唐小方) to cut off their supply lines, but Shen defeated them, killing the generals. Not long after, Yao Shao, reportedly from the stress of the defeat, died of illness. Yao Zan succeeded him and led another assault, but Shen defeated him as well.

When Liu Yu marched to Shancheng (陝城, in modern Sanmenxia, Henan) later that year, Shen Linzi's older brother, Shen Tianzi entered Wuguan Pass and attacked the Qin garrison at Yaoliu (嶢柳; in present-day Lantian County, Shaanxi). Fearing that the elder Shen had too few troops, Liu Yu sent his younger brother to reinforce him. By the time Shen Linzi arrived, however, the Qin army had already collapsed. The two brothers then pursued the scattered Qin soldiers. Shen's exploits made him renown throughout the Guanzhong region, and many of the local powerful clans surrendered at the sight of his army. After the surrender of the Later Qin emperor, Yao Hong, Shen Linzi pursued over 100,000 Qiang people fleeing to Longxi, chasing them all the way to Huaili (槐里; in present-day Xingping, Shaanxi) before returning with tens of thousands of captives.

=== Assisting Liu Yilong ===
Liu Yu was pleased Shen Linzi's performance in the campaign, often sending him letters of praise. During Liu Yu's return to the south, Shen led his navy from Shimen (石門; north of present-day Xingyang, Henan) to support him. There was consideration of rewarding Shen with a governor office, but Liu was reluctant to send him away from his military staff. In 418, Liu Yu's son, Liu Yilong was appointed the Inspector of Jing province, and after some discussion, Liu decided to send Shen over as an Army Advisor and the Administrator of Xinxing to assist his son. In 420, Liu Yu usurped the throne and established the Liu Song dynasty. Shen Linzi's peerage was then elevated to the Count of Hanshou County for his past contributions. When Liu Yilong was promoted to General Who Guards the West that year, Shen was also transferred to the Western Garrison and made General Who Establishes Might and Administrator of Hedong. He was later promoted to Military Consultant of the Western Garrison.

=== Death and posthumous honours ===
Later, Shen resigned from his office due to his mother's death and led the funeral procession to his hometown at Wuxing. After the burial, Liu Yu ordered Shen to return to his post without observing the mandatory mourning period, which Shen refused. As a compromise, Liu decreed that Shen only had to attend court on the first and fifteenth day of the lunar month, and when the general, Xie Hui was sick or dealing with family matters, Shen will have to take up his post. Shen agreed to this arrangement, but it was later claimed he became excessively ill from the grief of his mourning period. Thus, Liu forced him to enter the palace and personally oversaw his recovery. Shen was then allowed to return home, but Liu Yu soon fell ill himself. He summoned Shen back to the palace, but Shen became sick again, this time dying at the age of thirty-six.

The attendants caring for Liu Yu knew how much he valued Shen, and feared that reporting his death will only worsen their emperor's ailment. They refused to tell Liu Yu that Shen had had gone home, and whenever Liu wrote a letter to summon Shen, they would to write a fake reply from Shen. Therefore, by the time Liu Yu died, he was still unaware about Shen's death. The court rewarded Shen Linzi a coffin, court robes, clothes and money, and posthumously appointed him as General Who Conquers Barbarians. In 448, he was granted the posthumous name of "Huai".
