= Sima Maoying =

Sima Maoying 司馬茂英

Empress consort of Liu Song dynasty
- Tenure: 26 June 422 – 7 July 424
- Successor: Empress Yuan Qigui
- Born: 393? or 403/4?
- Died: 439; Jiankang, Liu Song
- Spouse: Emperor Shao of Song
Posthumous name
- Princess of Yingyang (営陽王妃)
- Father: Emperor Gong of Jin
- Mother: Empress Chu Lingyuan

Sima Maoying (Chinese: 司馬茂英; 393? or 403/4? – 439) was a princess of the Eastern Jin dynasty (with the title Princess Haiyan (海鹽公主)) and an empress consort of the Liu Song dynasty. Her father was Emperor Gong of Jin, and her husband was Emperor Shao of Song.

== Life ==
Sima Maoying was a daughter of Emperor Gong and his wife, Chu Lingyuan. She must have been created princess during her father's brief reign (419–420), and it was also at that time that she married Liu Yifu (the future Emperor Shao), then the heir apparent to the powerful general Liu Yu (the future Emperor Wu of Song). In 420, her father-in-law forced her father to yield the throne to him, ending Jin and establishing Liu Song. He created Liu Yifu crown prince, and she therefore carried the title of crown princess. In 421, he had her father killed. In 422, after Liu Yu died, Liu Yifu took the throne as Emperor Shao, and she was created empress.

However, in 424, officials whom Liu Yu had left in control of the government deposed Emperor Shao, believing him to be unfit to be emperor, demoting him to the title of Prince of Yingyang (营阳王). Empress Sima was therefore also demoted to Princess of Yingyang. Soon, the officials had Liu Yifu killed. They replaced him with his capable brother Liu Yilong (as Emperor Wen), and Emperor Wen, in 432, posthumously had his nephew Liu Lang (劉郎) (a son of his brother Liu Yigong (劉義恭) the Prince of Jiangxia) adopted into Liu Yifu's line as his son and created Liu Lang the Prince of Nanfeng (南丰王). The former Empress Sima therefore carried the title Princess Dowager of Nanfeng. She died in 439.

== Notes ==
Chinese royalty
Preceded by None (dynasty founded)	Empress of Liu Song; 422–424	Succeeded by Empress Yuan Qigui
Preceded by Empress Chu Lingyuan of Jin	Emperor of China (Southern); 422–424	Succeeded by Empress Yuan Qigui
Preceded by Empress Chu Lingyuan of Jin	Emperor of China (Henan); 422–423	Succeeded by Empress Helian of Northern Wei
