= Jiaofang =

The Jiaofang Academy (Chinese: 教坊; pinyin: jiàofāng), also translated as the Royal Academy or the Conservatory of Music and Dance, was the official school for training entertainers at imperial Chinese courts between the Tang dynasty and Ming dynasty, lasting more than 1000 years.

== History ==
In the 7^{th} century, the Jiaofang academy was set up by Emperor Gaozu of Tang to teach performers music, theater, and dance for court entertainment. The name of the academy at first was the Inner Jiaofang Academy (Chinese: 內教坊), coordinated by the Court of Imperial Sacrifices (Chinese: 太常寺). In the years of Empress Wu Zetian, the Private Academy was once called Yun-Shao Palace (Chinese: 雲韶府, which means the place of cloud and sunlight). Finally, Emperor Zhongzong of Tang renamed the academy to the Jiaofang academy.

In the Song dynasty, the Jiaofang academy remained responsible both for the training and employment of a variety of musicians and entertainers tasked with performing for the court. These performers had very low social status, and even if their performances were praised by the gentlemen at court, they continued to be viewed and treated as lesser sorts. The Jiaofang academy officials who managed these performers and oversaw their performances occupied a more ambiguous social position. On some occasions they were accepted as proper gentlemen and promoted within the civil service; on others their promotion was rejected because they were viewed and treated as lowly entertainers. The varying reception and treatment of these officials demonstrates the extent to which occupational musical performance continued to be associated with low-status social groups, as their titles did not necessarily translate into social recognition as a gentleman.
