= Zhu Lingshi =

Military general of the Jin dynasty (379–418)

- 朱齡石

General of the Right (右將軍)
- In office 418–418
- Monarch: Emperor An of Jin

Personal details
- Born: 379 Pei County, Jiangsu
- Died: 418 Xi'an, Shaanxi
- Children: Zhu Jingfu
- Parent: Zhu Chuo
- Courtesy name: Bo'er (伯兒)
- Peerage: Marquis of Fengcheng County (豐城縣侯)

Zhu Lingshi (379–418), courtesy name Bo'er, was a military general of the Jin dynasty (266–420). He was recruited by the Eastern Jin commander and future Emperor Wu of Liu Song, Liu Yu during the campaign against the usurper, Huan Xuan. As a general, he aided in the suppression of rebellions in southern China, most notably commanding the expeditionary force against the breakaway state of Qiao Shu and recovering Sichuan in 413. In 418, he was captured and executed by the Helian Xia dynasty while attempting to rescue the Guanzhong region.

== Background and early life ==
Zhu Lingshi was born the son of Zhu Chuo (朱綽) into a family of generals from Pei County. His grandfather, Zhu Teng (朱騰) once served as the General Who Establishes Might and the Interior Minister of Wu under the Eastern Jin. In 370, his uncles, Zhu Xian (朱憲) and Zhu Bin (朱斌), participated in Yuan Zhen's rebellion at Shouchun, but they were suspected of colluding with the enemy and were put to death by Yuan. After their deaths, Zhu Chuo defected to the Jin commander, Huan Wen and fought with distinction against the rebels.

By the time the rebellion was quelled the following year, Yuan Zhen had already died of illness, so Zhu Chuo illegally opened his coffin and mutilated his body to avenge his brothers. Huan Wen was furious with Zhu and wanted to execute him, but Huan's brother, Huan Chong, successfully pleaded to spare his life. As a result, Zhu felt indebted to Huan Chong, entering his service and treating him like a father. After Huan Chong's death in 384, Zhu Chuo reportedly coughed up blood out of grief and died that same year. The young Zhu Lingshi was then raised alongside Huan Chong's sons, who all saw him as their own brother.

== Service under Liu Yu ==
=== Campaign against Huan Xuan ===
Zhu Lingshi first began his career as a Palace General and often accompanied Huan Chong's sons. One of the sons, Huan Xiu, was garrisoned at Jingkou as the Inspector of Jiang province in 400, and around this time, Zhu was appointed as his Army Advisor. In 404, a group of generals led by Liu Yu mounted an uprising against the Huan clan at Jingkou, aiming to restore Emperor An of Jin after Huan Wen's son, Huan Xuan usurped the throne earlier that year. Huan Xiu was killed by the insurgents, but Zhu Lingshi was recruited by Liu Yu as a military aide.

Afterwards, Zhu followed Liu Yu to Jiangcheng (江乘; in present-day Xianlin University City, Jiangsu), where prior to a battle with Huan Xuan's forces, he said to Liu, "I have received great favour from the Huan family, and I cannot bear to turn my weapon against them. Please allow me stay behind the rear." Liu Yu respected his decision and granted his request. Following Huan Xuan's defeat later that year, Zhu was transferred to Magistrate of Wukang with the additional title of General Who Pacifies the Distance.

=== Suppressing rebellions ===
While the civil war was going on, a native of Wukang, Yao Xizu (姚系祖), gathered a band of outlaws in his hometown and pillaged the region. The bandits occupied natural defenses, and the surrounding counties and commanderies dared not attack them. When Zhu Lingshi arrived at his post, he appeared respectful before Yao Xizu and offered him a role as a military aide. Yao accepted the invitation, believing that his forces were strong enough that Zhu would not think of betraying him. As the two men formed a closer bond, Yao revealed to Zhu the location of his hideout. Zhu then invited Yao to a banquet, where he ordered his attendants to behead Yao before leading a surprise attack on the bandit hideout. Yao's family were unprepared and surrendered without a fight. Yao Zixu's brothers and a dozen of his partisans were executed, finally restoring peace to Wukang.

Liu Yu later recalled Zhu Lingshi to serve as an Army Advisor and Chief Clerk in his staff. He was then assigned to the capital at Jiankang as Capital-Gentleman of the Masters of Writing before he became Liu Yu's Army Advisor once again. In 409, he accompanied Liu Yu in his northern expedition against the Southern Yan, but was dismissed from his position due to misconduct. He was only reinstated the next year after Liu Yu captured the Yan capital, Guanggu.

While Liu Yu was away on his campaign, a large-scale rebellion erupted in the south headed by Lu Xun. His forces rushed home as Lu Xun's rebels reached Shitou near Jiankang. Zhu Lingshi was leading Liu Yu's central army, and when Lu Xun led a thousand of his elite troops to attack the south bank of the Yangtze River, Liu dispatched Zhu with Xianbei spearmen across the Huai River to reinforce the defenders at Shitou. Zhu's detachment fought fiercely, killing hundreds of the rebels and forcing Lu Xun to retreat. For his effort, Liu Yu appointed him as General Who Pacifies the Distance, Colonel Who Pacifies the Man tribes and Administrator of Xiyang. In 412, Zhu Lingshi followed Liu Yu during his western expedition against Liu Yi.

=== Conquest of Qiao Shu ===
Since 405, the Sichuan region was controlled by the rebel general, Qiao Zong, who proclaimed himself as the King of Shu. In 413, Liu Yu sought to reclaim the region and prepared his armies for another campaign. This time, he entrusted the commanding role to Zhu Lingshi, much to the opposition of his officials, who looked down on Zhu’s lowly background. Liu Yu ignored their concerns and appointed Zhu as General Who Establishes Might and Inspector of Yi province, assigning to him 20,000 troops, including Zang Xi (臧熹), Kuai En, Liu Zhong (劉鍾) and Zhu Lin (朱林) as his subordinates.

Before he embarked, Liu Yu spoke privately to Zhu Lingshi and gave him a set of instructions, advising him to take the longer outer river route towards the enemy capital at Chengdu instead of the shorter inner river route through Huanghu (黃虎, in modern Suining, Sichuan), which he anticipated to be heavily garrisoned. To prevent their plans from leaking out, Liu also gave him a sealed letter and warned him not to open it until he reached the city of Baidi. Zhu brought his army to the city and opened the letter, which told him to lead the main army through the outer river route, a detachment led by Zang Xi through the middle river to capture Guanghan and a decoy through the shorter route towards Huanghu. As Liu Yu predicted, the main Shu army under Qiao Daofu was defending the inner river route at Fucheng.

Zhu followed these instructions and eventually reached Pingmo (平模; in modern Leshan, Sichuan), where he was met with Qiao Zong's generals, Hou Hui (侯暉) and Qiao Shen (射譙). The Shu troops numbered over 10,000 and built two forts on the river bank to oppose the Jin invaders, one in the north and another in the south. The northern fort had more soldiers and better natural defenses than the southern fort, but with advice from Liu Zhong, Zhu concentrated his entire force on the northern fort for a full-on assault. They captured the fort, killing Hou Hui and Qiao Shen, before turning their attention to the southern fort and capturing it as well.

Afterwards, Zhu Lingshi abandoned his ships and continued his advance to Chengdu on foot. With Zang Xi's detachment also finding success at Guanghan, Qiao Zong fled from Chengdu, allowing Zhu Lingshi to occupy the city. Zhu had many of Qiao Zong's family members killed, but spared the rest of the rebels and allowed them to return to their daily lives. Not long after, Qiao Zong committed suicide, and his head was sent to Zhu Lingshi. The remaining Shu forces under Qiao Daofu collapsed, and Qiao Daofu was assassinated while attempting to flee to the Rau people.

Despite his initial leniency, a revolt soon broke out at Fucheng led by the Shu native, Hou Chande (侯產德). The uprising was swiftly put down, and Zhu subsequently carried out a large-scale purge of Hou's associates, killing many people. According to the Zizhi Tongjian, the Jin soldiers also looted the arsenal and warehouses of Chengdu, so to hide their crimes, Zhu ordered for the Shu official guarding these buildings, Ma Dan (馬耽) to be exiled to Yuesui Commandery (越巂郡; around present-day Xichang, Sichuan) instead of sending him to Jiankang. Before he could be escorted, Ma killed himself, and when Zhu's agents arrived, they had his body beheaded.

For the pacification of Shu, Zhu Lingshi was promoted to General Who Assists the State and Chief Controller of military affairs in the six commanderies of Baxi, Zitong, Dangqu, Southern Hanzhong, Angu and Huaining. He was also enfeoffed as the Marquis of Fengcheng County.

=== Later life and death ===
As Inspector of Yi province, Zhu Lingshi established diplomatic relations with Juqu Mengxun of the Northern Liang dynasty in the Hexi region. In 415, Zhu Lingshi was once again recalled to serve as Liu Yu's Army Advisor and later promoted to General of the Vanguard. When Liu Yu set off on his northern expedition against the Later Qin dynasty the following year, Zhu was commissioned as General of the Left to lead the palace guards at Jiankang in Liu's absence. During this time, Liu Yu's chief minister, Liu Muzhi, greatly trusted Zhu and often discussed important affairs with him.

In 418, after conquering the Later Qin, Liu Yu returned south to Pengcheng and appointed Zhu as his Marshal of the Right. However, at the time, the recently captured Guanzhong region, guarded by Liu Yu's son, Liu Yizhen, came under threat from the Helian Xia. As the situation in the Guanzhong spiralled out of control, Liu Yu dispatched Zhu Lingshi to replace Liu Yizhen as Inspector of Yong province, General of the Right and Chief Controller of military affairs in the Guanzhong. Liu Yu also permitted Zhu to abandon the Guanzhong if the region could no longer be held.

Later that year, Zhu Lingshi arrived at Chang'an, but while Liu Yizhen was withdrawing, his generals and soldiers had plundered the city and angered the local populace. As a result, Zhu was driven out of Chang'an, allowing the Xia army to occupy the city. Zhu fled to Tongguan to join the Jin general, Wang Jingxian (王敬先) at Caogong Rampart (曹公壘; in present-day Weinan, Shaanxi). His brother, Zhu Chaoshi, also arrived from Puban (蒲阪; in modern Yuncheng, Shanxi) to reinforce them. However, Xia forces led by Helian Chang soon attacked them and cut them off from their water supply, causing the Jin soldiers to suffer from thirst.

As the rampart was about to fall, Zhu Lingshi urged Zhu Chaoshi to escape so that he could care for their aging relatives back at home. However, Zhu Chaoshi refused and remained with his brother. Zhu Lingshi, Zhu Chaoshi and Wang Jingxian were all captured and sent to Chang'an, where the Xia Emperor, Helian Bobo ordered their executions. Zhu Lingshi's titles were inherited by his son, Zhu Jingfu (朱景符).
