= Qiao Zong =

Prince of Shu from 405 to 413

Qiao Zong 譙縱
- Prince of Shu

Ruler of Qiao Shu
- Reign: 405–413
- Born: Unknown
- Died: 413
Full name
- Family name: Qiáo (譙); Given name: Zòng (縱)
Regnal name
- 405–409: Prince of Chengdu (成都王); 409–413: Grand Commander, Chancellor of State, Prince of Shu, Given the Nine bestowments (大都督 相國 蜀王 加九錫)
- Dynasty: Qiao Shu

Qiao Zong (simplified Chinese: 谯纵; traditional Chinese: 譙縱; pinyin: Qiáo Zòng) (died 413) was a military leader in present-day Sichuan province in China during the Eastern Jin Dynasty. He proclaimed himself the Prince of Chengdu in 405 and was given the title "Prince of Shu" by Yao Xing, ruler of the Later Qin, in 409. His state of Shu (Chinese: 蜀; pinyin: Shǔ) is known in historiography as Qiao Shu (simplified Chinese: 谯蜀; traditional Chinese: 譙蜀; pinyin: Qiào Shǔ) or Western Shu (Chinese: 西蜀; pinyin: Xī Shǔ). His self-governing body coordinated offensive campaigns with Later Qin along the Yangtze River until Qiao's state was destroyed by a campaign under military subordinates of Liu Yu in 413.

== Background and establishment of Western Shu ==
Qiao Zong was from Baxi Commandery (巴西, roughly modern Nanchong, Sichuan). By 405, he was a mid-level military commander under the command of Mao Qu (毛璩), the Jin governor of Yi Province (modern Sichuan and Chongqing). In 404, the warlord Huan Xuan had usurped the Jin throne from Emperor An, and Mao had, in response, mobilized his forces to ready to attack Huan Xuan, but Huan Xuan was quickly overthrown by Liu Yu, who restored Emperor An. However, Huan Xuan's nephew Huan Zhen (桓振) occupied the important city of Jiangling (江陵, in modern Jingzhou, Hubei) and continued to resist. Mao therefore continued to advance east, ready to attack Huan Zhen. He divided his forces into two groups, one commanded by his brothers Mao Jin (毛瑾) and Mao Yuan (毛瑗), and one commanded by Qiao Zong and Hou Hui (侯暉).

However, the soldiers of Yi Province were not happy at this long-distance campaign, and when the forces commanded by Qiao and Hou reached Wuchengshuikou (五城水口, in modern Deyang, Sichuan), Hou and another officer, Yang Mo (陽昩), plotted a mutiny. Because Qiao Zong was considered a kind and careful man, the soldiers respected him, and therefore Hou and Yang tried to force Qiao to be their leader. Qiao refused and ran, but as the soldiers closed in on him, he tried to jump into the river to commit suicide, but he was pulled out of the water, and, with swords on his neck, forced to assume a place on a royal litter. Qiao pleaded against it, even prostrating himself on the ground and bowing to the soldiers, but was tied to the litter and forced to "lead" the mutineers. The mutineers then attacked and killed Mao Jin. When Mao Qu tried to respond, he was defeated and killed as well, along with Mao Yuan and their clan. Qiao Zong assumed the title Prince of Chengdu, and set his capital at Chengdu, the capital of Yi Province.

== Reign ==
Qiao Shu (譙蜀) 蜀
- 405–413
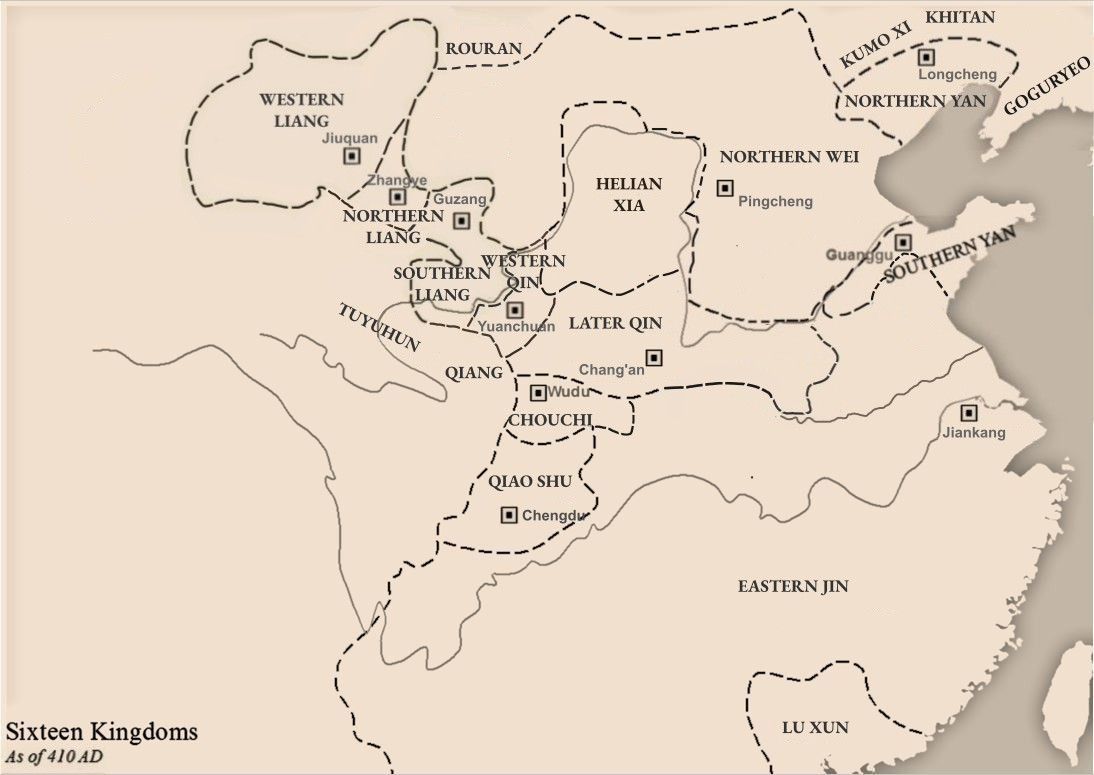
- Qiao Shu as of 410 AD
- Capital: Chengdu
- Government: Monarchy
- Prince
  - 405–413: Qiao Zong
- History
  - Established: 405
  - Later Qin bestows Qiao Zong the title of Prince of Shu: 409
  - Disestablished: 413
Preceded by	Succeeded by
Jin Dynasty (266–420)	Jin Dynasty (266–420)
- Today part of: China

The traditional histories, such as Jin Shu and Zizhi Tongjian, had little to say about Qiao Zong, but it appeared that he entrusted the important matters of the state and military to his brother Qiao Mingzi (譙明子) and cousins Qiao Hong (譙洪) and Qiao Daofu (譙道福).

In 406, Liu Yu sent the generals Mao Xiuzhi (毛脩之, Mao Jin's son), Sima Rongqi (司馬榮期), Wen Chumao (文處茂), and Shi Yanzu (時延祖) to attack Western Shu, but on the way, Sima Rongqi was assassinated by his subordinate Yang Chengzu (楊承祖), and the Jin forces had to retreat to Baidicheng. In 407, Mao Xiuzhi defeated and killed Yang, but Liu Yu sent another general, Liu Jingxuan (劉敬宣), to attack Western Shu. Also around this time, Qiao Zong submitted as a vassal to Later Qin's emperor Yao Xing. He also secretly maintained a relationship with Jin's governor of Guang Province (廣州, modern Guangdong and Guangxi), Lu Xun (盧循), who was formally a Jin official but had maintained in reality an independent administration over his domain.

In 408, Qiao Zong requested Yao Xing to send Huan Xuan's cousin Huan Qian (桓謙) to Chengdu, so that he and Huan Qian could jointly attack Jin. Huan Qian, believing that the people of the western provinces of Jin would follow him, went to Chengdu despite Yao Xing's misgivings about Qiao Zong's intentions, and when Huan Qian arrived in Chengdu and received welcome from many, Qiao Zong became suspicious and put him under house arrest.

In late 408, Liu Jingxuan advanced to Huanghu (黃虎, in modern Suining, Sichuan), and Qiao Zong sought aid from Later Qin; Yao Xing sent an army to assist him, but at the same time, Qiao Daofu was able to resist Liu Jingxuan's advance, and after the armies stalemated for 60 days, Liu Jingxuan's army ran out of food supplies and grew ill, and was forced to retreat.

In 409, Yao Xing created Qiao Zong the Prince of Shu, and granted him the nine bestowments.

In fall 410, after Liu Yu had destroyed Southern Yan, Lu Xun took the opportunity to capture much of Jin territory, but then was forced to retreat when Liu Yu returned from his Southern Yan campaign. Qiao Zong then, after approval from Yao Xing, attacked Jing Province (荊州, modern Hubei and Hunan) with Huan Qian and the Later Qin general Gou Lin (苟林). They were, however, defeated by Liu Yu's brother Liu Daogui (劉道規), and Huan Qian was killed. Qiao Zong withdrew back to his domain, but did manage to, in the process, capture Badong Commandery (巴東, roughly modern Chongqing).

In 412, Liu Yu commissioned the general Zhu Lingshi to command an army of 20,000 men against Western Shu. He ordered Zhu to take an alternative route than the one that Liu Jingxuan had taken—to bypass Huanghu and head for Chengdu by the circumlocutous route of Min River (岷江), but to avoid dissension and the news being leaked to Western Shu, Liu Yu also sealed his orders and publicly stated to Zhu to have them opened when he reaches Baidicheng. Zhu did so in summer 413, and the orders were as Liu Yu had previously told Zhu. Qiao Zong, not anticipating this, had Qiao Daofu defend the same route that Liu Jingxuan took—by Fu River (涪江), with his army camped at Fucheng (涪城, in modern Mianyang, Sichuan). Only when Zhu reached Pingmo (平模, in modern Leshan, Sichuan) did a Western Shu army, commanded by Hou Hui and Qiao Shen (譙詵) arrive to try to stop Zhu. Zhu attacked and killed Hou and Qiao Shen, and then abandoned his ships and headed directly toward Chengdu, facing little resistance on the way.

Qiao Zong, hearing that Zhu was about to arrive, abandoned Chengdu and fled toward Qiao Daofu's camp. His daughter suggested that they commit suicide on the ancestral tombs, but Qiao Zong refused. When he met Qiao Daofu, Qiao Daofu rebuked him for abandoning Chengdu, and he threw his sword at Qiao Zong. Qiao Zong fled but, believing that he could not escape, committed suicide by hanging. Qiao Daofu tried to continue to resist, but his army collapsed, and he was captured and killed by Zhu. Western Shu was at its end.

== See also ==
- Sichuan
- Jin Dynasty (266-420)

Chinese royalty
Recreated Title last held by Li Xiong	Prince of Chengdu; 405–409	Succeeded by Himself as Prince of Shu
Preceded by Himself as Prince of Chengdu	Prince of Shu; 409–413	Unknown
