= Lu Xun (Jin dynasty) =

Rebel leader of the Jin dynasty

- 盧循

Inspector of Guang province (廣州刺史)
- In office 405 – 411
- Monarch: Emperor An of Jin

Personal details
- Born: 4th century Zhuozhou, Hebei
- Died: c.1 June 411
- Spouse: Lady Sun
- Relations: Sun En (brother-in-law); Xu Daofu (brother-in-law)
- Parent: Lu Gu (father)
- Courtesy name: Yuxian (于先)
- Childhood name: Yuanlong (元龍)

Lu Xun (died c.1 June 411 (Note: An annotation in Lu Yu's biography in Sanguozhi also recorded that Lu Xun was Lu Chen's great-grandson. Note that Pei Songzhi was a contemporary of Lu Xun.)), courtesy name Yuxian, childhood name Yuanlong, was a rebel of the Jin dynasty (266–420). He was the brother-in-law of the Taoist rebel leader, Sun En, who assumed leadership of the rebellion following Sun's death in 402. While the Jin court was preoccupied with Huan Xuan's usurpation of the throne, Lu Xun led his remaining followers to seize control of Guang province in the far south. After the fall of Huan Xuan in 404, the Jin regent, Liu Yu appeased Lu by acknowledging him as provincial inspector and maintained peace for several years. However, while Liu Yu was away on an expedition against the Southern Yan in 410, Lu Xun and his brother-in-law, Xu Daofu launched a large-scale riverine attack on the Jin that would encompass most of southern China within a year. Lu's forces enjoyed early success, but when Liu Yu returned from his campaign, their numbers gradually dwindled as they suffered defeat after defeat on the battlefield. After months of evading capture, Lu committed suicide in 411.

== Background ==
Lu Xun was a descendant of the famous Eastern Han dynasty minister and general Lu Zigan and a great-great-grandson of the Jin minister Lu Zidao. His great-grandfather Lu Chen was a noted poet and served as an official for the Later Zhao dynasty in northern China. After the Later Zhao collapsed and Lu Chen's death in 352, Lu Xun's grandfather Lu Xu and father Lu Gu both escaped south to join the Eastern Jin dynasty. Thus, Lu Xun was also a second cousin of the Northern Wei minister Cui Hao, whose mother was Lu Chen's granddaughter.

Records describe Lu Xun as a cultured and sophisticated man who was skilled in chess and calligraphy, the latter of which he specialized in cursive and clerical scripts. When he was young, the Buddhist monk, Huiyuan once met him to judge his character and reportedly said, "You appear refined, but yet you harbour wicked intent. Is that not so?"

== Leading the rebellion ==
=== Succeeding Sun En ===
Lu Xun was married to Lady Sun, who was the sister of Sun En, the leader of the Taoist Five Pecks of Rice sect. When Sun En rebelled in 399, Lu Xun became one of his chief advisors. Sun was cruel and ruthless, but Lu often advised him against his brutal methods, so the followers often relied on Lu for protection.

In 402, Sun En was defeated and committed suicide. His remaining followers, still several thousands strong, elected Lu Xun as the new leader of their rebellion. At the time, the Jin commander, Huan Xuan had just forcibly seized control of the imperial court and wanted to stabilize the situation within the empire. He appeased Lu Xun by appointing him Administrator of Yongjia, but although Lu accepted his office, he and his followers refused to lay down their arms and continued to plunder. That same year, Lu Xun attacked Dongyang from Linjia, so Huan Xuan dispatched his general, Liu Yu to deal with him. Lu Xun was defeated and fled to Yongjia.

=== Capture of Guang province ===
In 403, Lu Xun sent his other brother-in-law, Xu Daofu to raid Dongyang, but Liu Yu also repelled him. In August or September, Liu Yu defeated Lu Xun at Yongjia, and after a pursuit, defeated him again at Jin'an. Lu Xun managed to escape to the sea and sailed southwards.

The following month, Lu Xun invaded Panyu, the provincial capital of Guang province. The Inspector, Wu Yinzhi defended the city for over a hundred days. Lu eventually launched a successful night attack on the city, capturing Wu Yinzhi and burning down all the government offices and residences. Subsequently, he proclaimed himself General Who Pacifies the South and took charge of affairs in Guang province. He had the remains of the dead burnt and buried their bones on an islet, with there reportedly being more than 30,000 skulls altogether. Lu also had Xu Daofu attack Shixing, where he captured Chancellor of the commandery, Ruan Tianzhi.

=== Submission to Liu Yu ===
While Lu consolidated his rule in Guang, Huan Xuan usurped the throne in the north, but he and his family were soon overthrown by an alliance of generals led by Liu Yu, who restored Emperor An of Jin and acted as his regent. In 405, Lu Xun sent envoys to the capital, Jiankang to present tributes. As the Jin had just defeated the Huan clan and was still recovering, Liu Yu decided to accept the envoys and officially appointed Lu Xun as General Who Attacks Barbarians, Inspector of Guang province and General of the Household Who Pacifies the Yue, while Xu Daofu was appointed Chancellor of Shixing. Lu gifted Liu with galangal zongzi (益智粽), so Liu reciprocated by sending him a "life-sustaining soup" (續命湯).

Lu Xun wanted to appoint the former Interior Minister of Langya, Wang Dan and the Chief Clerk of Pingnan. However, Wang convinced Lu to send him back to Liu Yu, promising to repay his kindness once he acquired a high-ranking position. Meanwhile, Liu Yu also wrote a letter to Lu demanding the release of Wu Yinzhi. While Lu initially refused, he was once again swayed by Wang Dan, who explained to him that keeping Wu would be a conflict of interest since he was the legitimate Inspector of Guang from the previous regime.

=== Invasion of Jing and Jiang provinces ===
In 410, Liu Yu was leading a northern expedition against the Southern Yan in the Shandong region. Upon learning of this expedition, Xu Daofu, urged Lu Xun to take advantage of his absence and attack Jiankang. Lu refused, but Xu then went to Panyu to personally meet him and presented his strategy to invade capital. Most of Lu Xun's followers were no longer content with living in Guang province and wanted to return to their homes in the north. With Xu threatening to carry out his plans regardless, Lu reluctantly complied.

Within a short period of time, all while evading the Jin court's attention, Xu Daofu was able to assemble a sizeable navy. Lu Xun advanced from Shixing to attack Changsha while Xu Daofu attacked the commanderies of Nankang, Luling, Yuzhang and others. The officials in these places were taken by surprise and abandoned their posts. The General Who Guards the South, He Wuji led his troops from Xunyang to face Lu Xun, but he encountered Xu Daofu's forces in Yuzhang instead and perished in battle.

Soon, Lu Xun marched north and sent Xu Daofu to attack Xunyang (or Jiangling) while he prepared to attack the various counties in the Central Yangtze region. The Inspector of Jing province, Liu Daogui set out to face them in battle but was defeated in Changsha. Lu Xun then marched to Baling and intended to go straight to the provincial capital of Jing, Jiangling, but he received news from Xu Daofu that the Inspector of Yu province, Liu Yi was arriving with reinforcements. Following his brother-in-law's advice, Lu linked up with Xu and sailed down the Yangtze river with a combined force of 100,000 soldiers and thousands of warships.

In May, Lu Xun fielded his army against Liu Yi at Sangluo islet, defeating him and advancing all the way to Jiangning. Liu Yi abandoned his boats and had to flee on foot with only a few hundred subordinates. The rest of his soldiers were captured, and the amount of military supplies he abandoned were said to have "piled up into a small mountain". Earlier, when his forces arrived at Xunyang, Lu Xun received news that Liu Yu had returned from his northern expedition. He had doubts regarding the report, but after Liu Yi's defeat, the prisoners confirmed to him of Liu Yu's return. Lu Xun and his followers were alarmed, so he planned to retreat to Xunyang, capture Jiangling and use these commanderies as his line of defence against imperial army. However, Xu insisted that they capitalize on their victories to launch a direct attack on Jiankang instead. Lu Xun hesitated for several days before eventually following Xu's advice.

=== Assault on Shitou ===
Soon, Lu Xun's forces arrived at the mouth of the Qinhuai River, prompting the Jin court to declare martial law inside and outside the capital. Xu Daofu requested permission to advance from Xinting to Baishi, where he would burn the enemy warships and land his troops to attack Liu Yu through several routes. Lu, cautious, asserted that they should wait for the main force to arrive, especially as they were rumours that the Jin commander, Meng Chang, had killed himself out of fear, much to Xu's disappointment.

Anticipating a surprise attack from Lu Xun, Liu Yu adopted Yu Qiujin's advice to chop down the trees and build fences in several places including Shitou and the mouth of the Qinhuai River. Lu Xun sent out his ambush units on the south bank of the river, ordering his old and weak soldiers to sail towards Baishi and claiming that his entire army was preparing to land at Baishi for battle. Liu Yu ordered his Army Advisors, Shen Linzhi and Xu Chite to guard the south bank and cut off the route to Chapu, stressing to them to hold their positions and not make any rash moves. He, along with Liu Yi, Zhuge Changmin and others then marched north to face Lu Xun.

Lu Xun set fire to Chapu and advanced to Zhanghou Bridge at Shitou, where he ambushed and defeated Xu Chite. Xu fled by boat to the north bank, while Shen Linzi and Liu Zhong tenaciously defended their position. A violent storm occurred and capsized Lu's ships, killing many of his soldiers. When Liu Yu's general, Zhu Lingshi arrived with reinforcements to aid Shen and Liu, Lu issued a retreat and led an elite force to rapidly advance to Danyang Commandery.

=== Alliance with Later Qin and Qiao Shu to take Jiangling ===
In June or July, Lu Xun invaded Jingkou and plundered the various counties, but was unable to gather any supplies. He said to Xu Daofu that now that their forces had been exhausted from the long campaign, they should withdraw back to Xunyang and then attack Jing province, where they can establish a new regime to compete with the Jin court in the east. The following month, Lu retreated south from Cai Islet back to Xunyang, leaving behind his general, Fan Chongming to with 5,000 men to defend Nanling. Soon, Liu Yu sent Wang Zhongde, Liu Zhong, Kuai En and Meng Huaiyu to chase after Lu Xun.

Around this time, the Heavenly King of Later Qin, Yao Xing and the Prince of Qiao Shu, Qiao Zong also began their invasion of Jing province. Yao Xing's general, Gou Lin attacked Xunyang and defeated the Jin general, Wang Zhenzhi. Lu Xun contacted Gou Lin and instructed him to press on to Jiangling while spreading a rumour that Xu Daofu had captured Jiankang. Qiao Zong's general, Huan Qian also arrived at Zhijiang, and he and Gou placed Jiangling under threat.

However, under Liu Daogui's leadership, the Jin forces were able swiftly deal with the Later Qin and Qiao Shu attacks, killing both Gou Lin and Huan Qian. The Jin Administrator of Poyang, Yuqiu Jin also routed Lu Xun's forces several times and captured Yuzhang, thereby cutting off the rebels' supply lines. Xu Daofu's forces of 30,000 soldiers marched towards Jiangling, but he suffered a heavy defeat to Liu Daogui's forces at Yuzhangkou and fled on a lone boat back to Penkou. As Liu Yu led the main force to face Lu Xun once more, Fan Chongmin was also defeated Nanling.

=== Defeats at Leichi and Zuoli ===
When Liu Yu arrived at Leichi in 411, Lu Xun spread a rumour that he did not intend to attack Leichi and only wanted to use the water current to pass downriver. However, Liu Yu knew that Lu Xun wanted a battle, so he advanced to Dalei. In the following days, Lu Xun and Xu Daofu led a massive fleet downriver with tens of thousands of soldiers. Liu Yu sent out his light ships to oppose their navy, equipping them with repeating crossbows. He also stationed his infantry and cavalry units on the west bank to prepare incendiaries. Taking advantage of the current and wind, Liu Yu's ships had Lu Xun's navy pressed against the west bank, where incendiaries rained down and set fire to their fleet. Lu Xun was badly routed, and he and his soldiers fled back to Xunyang.

From the Xunyang, Lu Xun then advanced towards Yuzhang, where they vigorously set up barricades to cut off Zuoli. After arriving at Zuoli, Liu Yu led his men to attack the barricades, and despite strong resistance from the rebels, the Jin troops broke through and marched onwards. Lu Xun fled on a lone boat while more than tens of thousands of his followers were killed or drowned themselves by jumping into the river. Lu Xun regathered his scattered soldiers and retreated back to Guang province, this time pursued by Liu Fan and Meng Huaiyu. Xu Daofu also retreated to defend Shixing, but was later killed by Meng Huaiyu's force.

=== Attempt to capture Jiao province and death ===
While Lu Xun was fighting in Jing province, Liu Yu had secretly sent his general, Sun Chu attack Panyu by sea and capture the city. When he reached Panyu and realized what had happened, Lu Xun placed Panyu under siege, but was defeated by reinforcements led by Shen Tianzi. Sun Chu and Shen Tianzi chased after Lu Xun, routing him at Cangwu, Yulin and Ningpu, but they soon had to withdraw as Sun became ill, allowing Lu to escape towards Jiao province.

Near the border of Guang and Jiao, Lu Xun surprise attacked Hepu and captured the commandery. The Inspector of Jiao, Du Huidu led his officials to oppose and defeat Lu at Shiqi. Despite this defeat, Lu still had 3,000 soldiers, and he was joined by remnants of previous local revolt led by Li Tuo, who brought more than 5,000 Li and Lao people in support. In June, Lu Xun appeared at the southern crossing at Longbian and fought Du Huidu in his final battle. Du's forces threw pheasant-tail torches to set Lu's fleet ablaze while his soldiers atop the surrounding hills fired arrow onto them. Lu's army was in disarray, and his soldiers all scattered.

With death seemingly inevitable, Lu Xun had more than ten of his wives and children poisoned. He then summoned his concubines and asked if they were willing to die with him. When some of them expressed reluctance, he had them forcibly poisoned before committing suicide by drowning. Du Huidu retrieved his body and beheaded him. Lu Xun's father, Lu Gu was also executed along with five other accomplices, and their seven heads were sent to Jiankang in separate boxes.
