= List of early Germanic peoples =

The list of early Germanic peoples is a catalog of ancient Germanic cultures, tribal groups, and other alliances of Germanic tribes and civilizations from antiquity. This information is derived from various ancient historical sources, beginning in the 2nd century BC and extending into late antiquity. By the Early Middle Ages, early forms of kingship had started to shape historical developments across Europe, with the exception of Northern Europe. In Northern Europe, influences from the Vendel Period (c.AD 550- 800) and the subsequent Viking Age (c. AD 800- 1050) played a significant role in the Germanic historical context.

The associations and locations of the numerous peoples and groups in ancient sources are often subject to heavy uncertainty and speculation, and classifications of ethnicity regarding a common culture or a temporary alliance of heterogeneous groups are disputed. It is uncertain whether certain groups are Germanic in the broader linguistic sense or whether they consisted of speakers of a Germanic language.

The names listed below are not terms for ethnic groups in any modern sense but the names of groups that were perceived in ancient and late antiquity as Germanic. It is essentially an inventory of peoples, groups, alliances and associations stretching from the Barbaricum region east of the Rhine to the north of the Danube (also known as Germania), especially those that arrived during the Migration Period.

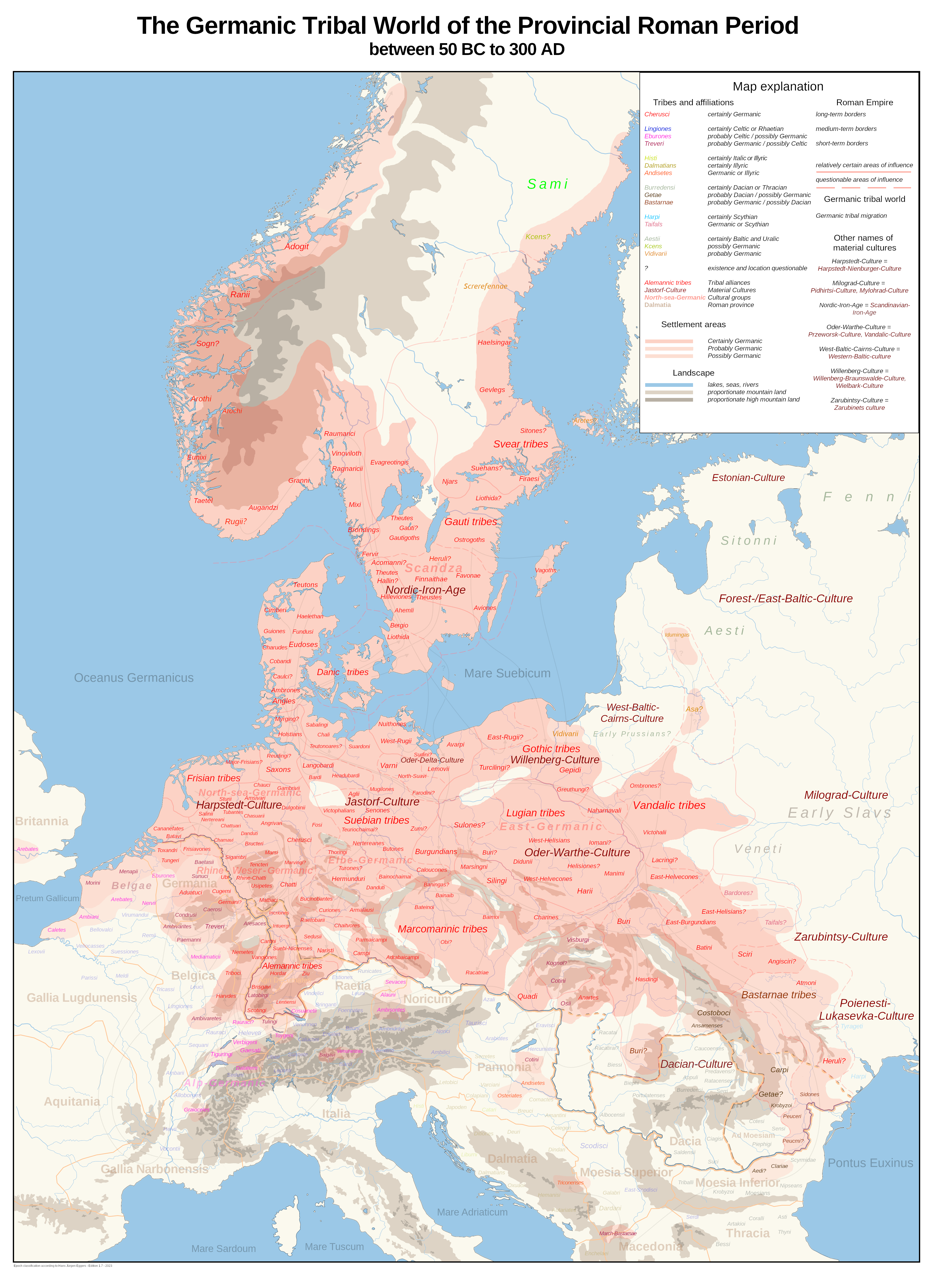
Settlement area reconstruction of Germanic tribes in the Provincial Roman Period

== In alphabetical order ==
The present list is largely based on the list of Germanic tribal names and its spelling variants contained in the first register of the Reallexikons der Germanischen Altertumskunde.

The first column contains the English name and its variants, if one is common, otherwise the traditional ancient name. The second column contains ancient names of Latin and Greek authors, the latter both in transcription and in Greek. The third column gives a brief description followed by a location.

The fifth column gives important sources of tradition for the group in question. The few main ancient sources for names and location of Germanic tribes are not linked. These are:

- Julius Caesar: Commentarii de Bello Gallico
- Jordanes: De origine actibusque Getarum, short Getica
- Ptolemy: Geography
- Tacitus: Germania

Name	Ancient name	Description	Location	Sources
A
Adogit			Hålogaland, the northernmost Norwegian Petty Kingdom. Between the Namdalen valley in Nord-Trøndelag and the Lyngen fjord in Troms.	Jordanes
Adrabaecampi	Adrabaikampoi (´Αδραβαικαμποι)	See Kampoi	North of the Danube, south of Bohemia	Ptolemy
Aduatuci, Atuatuci	Aduatici, Atouatikoi (Ἀτουατικοί)	Left bank of the Rhine in the squad of the Belgian tribes against Caesar	In the first century BC in the area of today's Tongeren (Belgium), between the Scheldt and the Meuse	Julius Caesar
Aelvaeones, Elouaiones, Elvaiones, Aelvaeones, Ailouaiones, Alouiones, Ailouones	Alouiones (Αλουίωνες), Helouaiones ('Ελουαίωνες)	See Helveconae	Presumably at the middle Oder, today's Silesia	Tacitus, Ptolemy
Agradingun		Saxon tribe	Middle course of the Weser	
Ahelmil			Scandza	Jordanes
Alemanni, Alamanni	Alamanni	From various Elbe Germanic tribes, among them probably Suebian tribes, armies and followers from the 3rd century on population group, which emerged from provincial Roman soil (Agri decumates)	Core areas in Baden-Württemberg and Alsace, in Bavarian Swabia, German-speaking Switzerland, Liechtenstein and Vorarlberg	
Ambrones, Obrones, Ymbre	Ambrones	Participation of tribal groups in the calvacade of the Cimbri and the Teutons at the end of the 2nd century BC	North Sea Coast	
Amoþingas				
Ampsivarii, Ampsivari, Amsivarii, Amsivari	Ansibarii, Ansivaroi (Ἀνσιβαριοί)	Southern neighbours of the Frisii	1st century in the lower Emsland	Tacitus
Anartes, Anarti, Anartii, Anartoi	Anarti	Possibly Germanic tribe in the border area between the Teutons and the Dacians	Hungary or Romania	Julius Caesar
Angarii		See Angrivarii		
Angeron				
Angisciri		Tribe in the wake of Dengizich		Jordanes
Angles, Anglians	Anglii, Angeiloi (Άγγειλοι), Angiloi (Άγγιλοι)	North Germanic people counted among the Ingaevones by Tacitus	Originally in Jutland (Schleswig-Holstein), later Mittelelb-Saale area, after 200 emigration to Great Britain	Tacitus
Anglo-Saxons		A collection of people from the Angles and Saxons, as well as the Jutes and Franks, who originated on British soil	Southeastern England	
Angrivarii, Angrevarii, Angrivari, Angrevari, Angarii, Angerii, Angrii, Angari, Angeri, Angri, Aggeri, Angriouarroi, Aggerimenses, Angerienses	Angrivarii, Angriouarioi (Αγγριουάριοι)	In the 1st century, south of the Chauci, north of the Cherusci, northwest of the Dulgubnii and east of the Ampsivarii	On the Weser, mainly on the right bank, from the tributary of the Aller to the Steinhuder Meer	
Aringon				
Armalausi, Armilausi		Probably a part of the Hermunduri, in the 3rd and 4th centuries between the Alemanni and the Marcomanni	Possibly in the Upper Palatinate	Tabula Peutingeriana
Arochi				
Arosaetan				
Ascomanni		Designation of the Vikings at Adam of Bremen		
Astfalon				
Atmoni				
Auarinoi				
Augandxii				
Augandzi			Agder	
Avarpi, Auarpoi, Avarni				Ptolemy
Aviones, Auiones, Chaibones	Aviones		Jutland peninsula	
B
Baemi, Baimoi			North of the Danube and south of the Luna forest.	Ptolemy
Bainaib				
Baiuvarii, Bavarii, Baioarii, Baiovarii	Bavarii	People formed towards the end of the migration of peoples in the 5th century, with a core area in Raetia and Noricum	Altbayern, Austria and South Tyrol	
Banochaemae, Bainochaimai			Near the river Elbe, east of the Harz mountains, or Thuringian Forest or both.	
Bardes, Bards, Bardi		Possibly group of the Lombards, which didn't migrate south	South of the Elbe, in the area of Bardowick and Lüneburg	
Bardongavenses				
Bastarnae, Bastarni, Basternae	Bastarnae	Fights with the Romans in the 3rd century BC, presumably Germanic tribe predominates	East side of the Carpathian Mountains to the mouth of the Danube estuary	Polybius
Batavi, Batavii, Batavians	Batavi	Originally allies of the Romans in the province of Gallia Belgica, 69 Revolt of the Batavi under Gaius Julius Civilis	In the 1st century at the mouth of the Rhine	
Bateinoi, Batini	Batini			
Bergio				
Betasii, Baetasi	Baetasii			
Boutones				
Brisgavi, Brisigavi	Brisgavi, Brisigavi	Alemannic tribe in the 5th century	Breisgau	
Brondings			Probably on the Swedish island of Brännö, west of Gothenburg in the Kattegatt.	
Bructeri, Boructuari, Boruactii, Borchtii	Bructeri, Boructuari, Broukteroi (Βρούκτεροι)	In the 1st century, opponents of the Romans in the Battle of the Teutoburg Forest	Between the middle Ems and the upper Lippe	
Bructuarii				
Bucinobantes	Bucinobantes	Alemannic tribe in the 4th century	Main estuary at Mainz	Ammianus Marcellinus
Burgodiones				
Burgundians	Burgundiones	East Germanic people with late antique foundations on the Rhine and later the Rhone		
Buri	Buri		North of the Danube, in an area near what is now the west of modern Slovakia.	
C
Caemani	Caemani, Paemani			
Caeroesi, Caerosi	Caerosi, Caeroesi, Ceroesi, Cerosi	Left Rhine Celto-Germanic tribe	In the 1st century BC in the Eifel-Ardennes area	Julius Caesar
Calucones				
Campsiani				
Cananefates, Canninefates, Caninefates, Canenefatae	Cannenefates, Canninefates, Cannenafates, Cannefates	In the 1st century, western neighbours of the Batavi	Around Voorburg in South Holland	
Cantware				
Caracates. Caeracates		Possibly an old Northern German Celtic tribe of the Cimbri or a Vindelician tribe. Location unknown.		
Carpi, Carpiani	Carpi, Carpiani	Southeastern European people, classification as Germanic is controversial	End of the 3rd century in Moesia and Dacia	
Caritni			Ludwigshafen am Rhein	Ptolemy
Casuari				
Caulci				
Chaedini	Chaideinoi			
Chaemae				
Chaetuori	Chaituoroi (Χαιτούωροι)			
Chaibones, Aviones, Auiones				
Chaideinoi				
Chali	Chali			
Chamavi	Chamavi, Chamauoi (Χαμαυοί)	Neighbours of the Angrivarii and Dulgubnii, eventually went into the Franks	In the 1st century on the Lower Rhine	Tacitus
Charini, Charinni, Harii	Charini, Harii			
Charudes		See Harudes		
Chasuarii		See Chattuarii		
Chatti, Catti, Cattai, Cathi, Cathai, Chattai, Chatthi, Chatthai	Chatti, Catti, Cathi, Chattai (Χάτται), Chattoi (Χάττοι)	In the 1st century, neighbours of the Suebi, precursors of the Hesse	Valleys of the Eder, Fulda and the upper reaches of the Lahn	
Chattuarii, Chasuarii, Hasuarii, Attuarii	Atthuarii, Attuarii, Chattouarioi (Χαττουάριοι)			
Chatvores, Catvori?		Name is Greek or Latin in origin and means "bristle eater"	Upper Palatinate	Ptolemy
Chaubi	Chauboi (Χαῦβοι)			
Chauci	Chauki, Chauchi, Cauci, Kauchoi (Καῦχοι), Kaukoi (Καῦκοι)	Tribe counted Ingaevones by Tacitus	On both sides of the lower Weser	
Cherusci	Cherusci, Cherouskoi (Χεροῦσκοι), Chairouskoi (Χαιρουσκοί)	Tribe of Arminius, in the 1st century, opponents of the Romans	On both sides of the upper Weser run in East Westphalia and in Lower Saxony to the Elbe	
Cilternsaetan, Ciltate/Ciltanati?		Possibly a tribe of Etruscan origin or a tribe named after the Roman Plebeian family Cilnii.		
Cimbri	Combri, Cymbri, Cimbri, Kimbroi (Κίμβροι)	Along with the Teutons and Ambrones after 120 BC incidence in Gaul and Italy	Originally probably Himmerland, Jutland. Most consider this tribe a confederation of Northern German Celtic tribes before their defeat against the Romans. If Celtic most likely a Q-Celtic speaking people.	
Clondicus	Kloilios (Κλοίλιος), Claodikus			
Cobandi			Jutland	
Coldui				
Condrusi	Condrusi	Celtic-Germanic mixed culture	In the 1st century BC in the left bank of the Middle Rhine region	Julius Caesar
Corconti	Korkontoi			
Crimean Goths		Descendants of the Ostrogoths	From the middle of the 3rd century on the Crimean peninsula	
Cugerni, Cuberni, Guberni	Cugerni, Cuberni	Tribe of the Rhine-Weser Germanic peoples	In the 1st century in the left bank of the Lower Rhine (Kreis Kleve)	
Curiones				
D
Daliterni				
Danduti	Dandutoi (Δανδοῦτοι)			
Danes	Dani, Danoi (Δανοι)	From the 6th century in Scania and Jutland	Scania and Jutland	Procopius, Jordanes
Danube Suebi				
Dauciones	Daukiones (Δαυκίωνες)			
Deanas				
Deningei				
Derlingun				
Diduni	Diduni			
Doelir				
Dorsaetan	Dornware			
Dounoi	Δοῦνοι			
Dulgubnii	Dulgubnii, Dulgitubini, Dulcubuni	In the 1st century, southeast of the Angrivarii and the Chamavi	South of Hamburg in the area of the Lüneburg Heath and all around Celle	Tacitus
E
East Herules, Ostherules				
East Saxons				
Eburones	Eburones	Probably Celtic tribe, counted as Germanic people by Caesar	Between the Rhine, Meuse, Rhineland, Northern Ardennes and Eifel	
Elbe Germanic peoples		Archaeologically defined group of Germanic tribes (including the Semnones, Hermunduri, Quadi, Marcomanni and Lombards)	From the Elbe estuary on both sides of the river to Bohemia and Moravia	
Elbe Suebi				
Elmetsaetan				
Elouaiones	Ailouaiones (Αἰλουαίωνες), Alouiones (Αλουίωνες), Helouaiones ('Ελουαίωνες), Ailouones (Αἰλούονες), Helouones ('Ελουωνες)			
Endoses				
Eudoses	Eudusii, Eudoses, Eduses, Edures, Eudures			
Eunixi				
Eutes		see Jutes		
Evagre				
F
Falchovarii				
Fariarix				
Farodini				
Favonae	Favonae, Phauonai (Φαυόναι)			
Færpingas	Feppingas			
Fervir				
Finnaithae	Finnaithae			
Firaesi	Phrisioi (Φρίσιοι), Phiraisoi (Φιραῖσοι)			
Firðir				
Firihsetan	Virsedi			
Fosi, Fosii	Fosi	Small neighbouring tribe of the Cherusci, who perished with them	In the 1st century in the headwaters of the Aller	
Franks		Large tribal union, which integrated numerous Germanic tribes in late antiquity	Right of the Rhine to the mouth of the Rhine estuary, from the 4th century onwards to Roman territory left of the Rhine	
Frisiavones	Frisiavones, Frisaebones		Rhine delta	Pliny the Elder, Natural History 4,101; CIL 6, 3260 et al.
Frisii, Frisians	Frisii	North Sea Germanic tribe, counted as the Ingaevones by Tacitus	In the 1st century from the mouth of the Rhine to about the Ems	Tacitus
Frugundiones			East of the Oder	Ptolemy
Frumtingas				
Fundusi			Jutland	
G
Gambrivii	Gambrivi		Probably near the Weser	Strabo, Tacitus
Gautigoths	Gautigoth		Probably in Västergötland	Jordanes
Geats	Goutai (Γου̑ται), Geatas, Getae	North Germanic people, often identified with the Goths	Southern Sweden	Ptolemy
Geddingas				
Gegingas				
Gepids	Gepidi, Gebidi, Gipedae	From the middle of the 5th century, empire-building on the middle Danube, possibly related to the Goths	Romania	Jordanes, Procopius
Gewisse, Gewissæ		Saxon ethnic group in Britain	At the end of the 5th century on the Upper Thames in England	
Gifle				
Gillingas				
Glomman				
Goths, Gotones, Gutones	Gutones	Split up during the Migration Period into the Visigoths and Ostrogoths, each with their own imperial formations on Roman soil	At the turn of the day, north of the Vistula knee	Jordanes
Gotthograikoi			Northwestern Asia Minor on the south side of the Sea of Marmara.	
Graioceli				
Grannii	Granii			
Greuthungi, Greuthungs, Greutungi, Greutungs	Greothingi, Grutungi, Grauthungi, Greutungi	Another name of the Ostrogoths		Ammianus Marcellinus, Jordanes
Guddinges				
Guiones				
Gumeningas				
Gutes, Gotlanders				
H
Haddingjar				
Hadubardes, Heaðobeardan				
Háleygir				
Hallin	Hallin			
Halogit				
Harii	Harii	Tribe of the Lugii	Between the Vistula and the Oder	Tacitus
Harudes, Charudes, Harothes	Harudes, Charudes (Χαροῦδες), Arudes	In the 1st century BC, allies of the Ariovistus against Caesar	According to Ptolemy in the middle of the 2nd century in Hardsyssel, Jutland	Julius Caesar, Ptolemy
Hasdingi, Asdingi, Haddingjar		Tribe of the Vandals	In the 2nd century in Romania and Hungary	
Hedeninge				
Heinir, Heiðnir				
Helisii				
Helusii	Hellusii			
Helveconae, Helvaeonae, Helvecones, Helvaeones, Helouaiones	Helvecones	Tribe of the Lugii	Between the Vistula and the Oder	Tacitus
Herefinnas				
Herminones, Erminones, Hermiones, Irminones	Herminones	Large group of Germanic people, occupying the middle between the Ingaevones and the Istvaeones		Tacitus, Pliny the Elder, Pomponius Mela
Hermunduri, Ermunduri, Hermanduri, Hermunduli, Hermonduri, Hermonduli	Ermunduri, Hermunduri	Elbe Germanic tribe	Upper reaches of the Elbe	
Herules, Erules, Heruli, Eruli	Eruli, Erouloi (Ερουλοι)	Participants in the parades of the Goths	From the middle of the 3rd century on the north coast of the Black Sea	
Hilleviones	Hilleviones			
Holstens, Holcetae				
Holtsaeten	Holtsati			
Hordar				
Hreiðgoths				
Hringar				
Hugones				
Hundingas		See Hundings		Widsith
I
Incriones, Inkriones	Inkriones (ιγκριονες)	Tribe of the Rhine-Weser Germanic peoples, middle of the 2nd century, neighbours of the Tencteri	Between the Rhine and the Taunus	Ptolemy
Ingaevones, Ingvaeones, Ingwaeones, Inguaeones, Inguiones, Ingwines, Guiones	Ingvaeones, Ingaevones, Ingvaenoes, Inguaeones	Large group of Germanic tribes located on the North Sea coast by Tacitus		Tacitus, Pliny the Elder
Inguiones				
Inguaii, Ingwaii				
Intuergi	Intouergoi, Intouergoi (Ιντουεργοι)		Between the Rhine and the Taunus	Ptolemy
Irminones, Herminones, Hermiones				
Istvaeones, Istaevones, Istriaones, Istriones, Sthraones	Istvaenoes, Istaevones	Large group of Germanic tribes located on the Rhine by Tacitus		Tacitus
J
Jutes, Eudoses, Eutes, Euthiones	Eurii, Eutii, Eucii, Euthiones	Originally in Jutland, later in the south of Great Britain	Until the 5th century on Jutland	
Juthungi	Iouthungi, Iuthungi	Probably an Alemannic tribe	From the 3rd to the 5th century, north of the Danube and Altmühl	
K
Kampoi, Campi, Campes	Kampoi (Κάμποι)	Group of unclear designation north of the Danube and south of Bohemia in the 2nd century		Ptolemy
Kvenir, Kvanes				
L
Lacringi				
Landoudioi, Landi	Landi, Landoudioi		From the 1st century on the Lahn in Middle Hesse	Strabo, Ptolemy
Lemovii, Lemonii	Lemovii	To Tacitus, neighbours of the Rugii and Goths	From the 1st century, southern Baltic Sea coast between the Oder and the Vistula	
Lentienses, Linzgau	Lentienses	Alemannic tribe	Mid-3rd century between the Danube in the north, Iller in the east and Lake Constance in the south	Ammianus Marcellinus
Levoni				
Liothida				
Little Goths	Gothi minores	Group of the Goths, Ulfilas tribe, at the time of the Jordanes in the area of Nicopolis in Moesia	South bank of the lower Danube	Jordanes
Lombards, Longobards, Langobards, Winili, Winnili, Winnilers	Langobardi, Langobardoi (Λαγγοβάρδοι)	Part of the Suebi, from the middle of the 6th century founding of the empire in Italy (Kingdom of the Lombards)	In the 1st century BC on the lower Elbe	
Lugii, Lygii	Lugii, Lúgioi			
M
Maiates, Maiati				
Manimi	Manimi	Tribe of the Lugii	Between the Vistula and the Oder	Tacitus
Marcomanni	Marcomanni	Possibly a tribe of the Suebi, from the middle of the 2nd century, opponents of the Romans in the Marcomannic Wars	In the 1st century in Bohemia	
Marezaten				
Marobudui				
Marsaci				
Marsi, Marsigni	Marsi, Marsoí (Μαρσοί), Marsigni	Destroyed after participation in the Battle of the Teutoburg Forest in the year 14 by Germanicus	Between the Rhine, Ruhr and Lippe	
Marvingi	Marouingoi		Lower Saxony/North Rhine-Westphalia	Ptolemy
Mattiaci	Mattiaci, Mattiakoi (Ματτιακοί)	Probably a part of the Chatti, Romanised from the 1st century	Around Wiesbaden, in the Taunus and in the Wetterau	
Menapii, Manapi	Menapii	Celtic-Germanic mixed people, subjugated by Caesar in the 1st century BC in Gallia Belgica	Lower Rhine, Flanders	Julius Caesar
Merscware				
Mimmas				
Mixi		Called by Jordanes as residents of Scandza	Scandinavia	Jordanes
Moselle Franks, Mosellians		Subset of the Franks, separated from the Ripuarian Franks in the 5th century	Upper Rhine and Moselle	
Mugilones	Mougilones			
Myrgingas		East Frisian part of the Frisii, who settled around 700 in Nordfriesland	Nordfriesland, Tönnern, Rungholdt	Widsith
N
Nahanarvali, Naharvali	Nahanarvali, Naharvali	Tribe of the Lugii	Between the Vistula and the Oder	Tacitus
Narisci, Naristi, Varisti, Varasci, Varisci	Naristi, Varisti, Varistae	Neighbours of the Marcomanni, Quadi and Armalausi	Upper Palatinate, Upper Franconia and North Bohemia	Tacitus
Neckar Suebi	Suebi Nicrenses	Romanised tribe of the Suebi	In the 1st and 2nd century in the area of Ladenburg	
Nemetes	Nemetai (Νεμῆται)	(Probably Germanic) allies of the Ariovistus	In the 1st century BC on the Rhine between Lake Constance and Palatinate	Julius Caesar
Nertereanes				
Nervii	Nervii	Celtic tribe. According to Strabo they were originally Germanic and according to Tacitus they claimed Germanic descent.	In the Gallia Belgica between the Meuse and the Scheldt in the north and the west of today's Belgium	Julius Caesar, Tacitus
Nictrenses				
Nistresi				
Njars				
Nordliudi				
Normans		Collective name for the Northern European Germanic tribes, which undertook raids in the 8th and 11th century to the south (England, Ireland, Francia, Sicily and the Mediterranean, present-day Russia), also synonymous with the Vikings		
North Suebi				
Nuithones, Nuitones	Probably a misprint of Teutones			
O
Omanii				
Ostrogoths	Ostrogothi, Ostrogoti, Ostrogotae, Ostrogothae, Austrogothi	Part of the Goths, first in Pannonia, then empire-building in Italy		Jordanes
Otingis				
P
Paemani, Permani	Paemani, Caemani	Left Rhine Celto-Germanic people	Eifel, Ardennes	Julius Caesar
Parmaecampi	Parmaikampoi (Παρμαικαμπο)	See Kampoi	North of the Danube in Bavaria	Ptolemy
Peucini		Part of the Bastarnae		Tacitus
Peucmi				
Phalians		Constructed tribe as Germanic "natives" of Westphalia and Eastphalia		
Pharodini	Pharadinoi		Mecklenburg	
Q
Quadi	Quadi	Tribe of the Suebi, participants of the Marcomannic Wars		Tacitus
Quirounoi?	Possibly a mistaken transliteration of the Greek name Ούίρουνοι = Oúírounoi; O and not Q, mistaken O for a Q? Initial Greek Ou = W; Viruni in Latin; possibly a variant of Varini? Ουαρίνοι – Ouarínoi = Warínoi			
R
Raetovari	Raetobarii	Alemannic tribe	Probably in Nördlinger Ries	
Ragnaricii, Ranii				
Raumarici				
Reudigni, Reudinges, Reudinges, Reudingi, Holstens			Randers	
Ripuarian Franks, Ripuarians, Ripuarii, Rhinefranks, Rhine Franks		Subset of the Franks in the Middle Rhine		
Rosomoni	Rosomoni			
Routiklioi				
Rugii, Rygir,Rugi,Rogi,Rugians	Rugii	Moved in the Migration Period with the Goths to the south	Originally between the Vistula and the Oder, later empire-building in Lower Austria	
Rus'		See Varangians		
S
Sabalingioi	Sabalingioi		Jutland	
Sahslingun				
Salian Franks, Salians	Salii	Part of the Franks	Originally from the Lower Rhine to the Salland on the IJssel, then in North Brabant and later in the Tournai area	
Saxons	Saxones	West Germanic people's Association of the Chauci, Angrivarii and Cherusci	From the 1st century in northwest Germany and the east of the Netherlands	
Scopingun				
Scordisci		Related to the Bastarnae according to Titus Livy	Šar Mountains to Singidunum in the Balkans	Titus Livy
Scotelingun				
Sedusii	Sedusii	Ally of the Ariovistus, classified by Caesar as Germanic		Julius Caesar
Segni	Segni			
Semnones	Semnones (Σεμνόνες)	Part of the Suebi, their tribe, according to Tacitus	Around 100 between the Elbe and the Oder from the Bohemian border to the Havel	Tacitus
Sibini	Sibinoer			
Sicambri	Sugambri			
Sidini			Western Pomerania	
Sidones				
Sigambres		See Sugambri		
Silingi, Silings	Silingae	Part of the Vandals	Silesia, later Andalusia	
Singulones	Sigulones		Jutland	
Sitones, Sithones		Neighbours of the Suiones	Probably Scandinavia	Tacitus
Sciri		Moved with the Bastarnae to the south, in the 5th century short imperial formation in Pannonia		
Steoringun				
Sturii	Sturii			
Sturmarii	Sturmera			
Suarines, Suardones	Suarines, Suarmes, Smarines	Tribe of the Suebi	Around Lake Schwerin in Mecklenburg	
Suebi, Suevi, Suavi, Suevians, Swabians	Suebi, Suewi, Sueboi (Σύηβοι)	Important Germanic tribal group, to which according to Tacitus the Semnones, Marcomanni, Hermunduri, Quadi and Lombards belonged	In the northeast of Germania on the Baltic Sea up to the German Central Uplands	Tacitus
Suetides				
Sugambri, Sigambri, Sugambi, Sigambri	Sugambri, Sygambri, Sugambroi (Σύγαμβροι), Sugumbri, Sucambri, Sycambres, Sugameri	7 BC defeated by Tiberius and settled on the left of the Rhine	In the 1st century left-bank areas on the Meuse	
Suiones, Suones, Sueones, Suehans, Sweones, Swiones, Sviones	Suiones	Northern European sea people described by Tacitus	Possibly Scandinavia	
Sulones				
Sunuci, Sinuci, Sunici	Sunuci	Possibly precursors of the Ubii	In the 1st and 2nd century in the Rhineland between Aachen and Jülich	
Swedes, Svear	Svea	North Germanic tribe	Svealand in the region of the Mälaren river valley as well as Uppland, Gästrikland, Västmanland and Södermanland	
T
Taetel				
Taifals	Taifali, Taifalae, Theifali	Probably a Germanic tribe in the group of the Visigoths	From the 3rd century in Dacia and Moesia	
Tencteri, Tenchteri, Tenctheri	Tencteri, Toncteri, Tenkteroi (Τέγκτηροι)	Northern neighbours of the Usipetes, opponents of Caesar	In the 1st century BC on the Lower Rhine	
Thervingi, Tervingi, Teruingi	Tervingi	See Visigoths		
Thelir	Thilir, Þilir, teler, telar	The Migration Period and the Viking Age	The region now known as Upper Telemark in modern Norway	
Teuriochaimai				
Teutonoari			Unterelbe (Lower Elbe)	
Teutons	Teutoni, Teutones	Together with the Cimbri and the Ambrones after the 120 BC invasion of Gaul and Italy	Originally Thy, Jutland, south of the Cimbri	
Texuandri				
Theustes				
Thiadmariska	Thiadmariski			
Thuringii, Thuringians, Turingi, Toringi	Thueringi, Tueringi, Thuringin, Turingi	In the 3rd or 4th century from the Angles, Warini and other originating tribal groups	Between the Thuringian Forest, Werra, Harz and the Elbe	
Texandri, Texuandri, Taxandri, Toxandrians			Between the rivers Meuse and Scheldt in the Belgian-Dutch border region	
Treveri, Treviri	Treverii, Treviri, Treveri	Celtic tribe that claimed Germanic descent.	From the Rhine to the land of the Remi	Julius Caesar, Tacitus
Triboci, Tribocci	Triboces, Triboci, Tribocci, Tribochi, Tribocchoi (Τριβόκχοι)	In the 1st century BC, allies of the Ariovistus	On the Rhine around Strasbourg and Haguenau	Julius Caesar, Ptolemy
Tubantes, Tubanti	Tubanti, Tubantes, Toubantoi (Τούβαντοι)	In the 1st century, opponents of Germanicus	End of the migration period in the eastern Netherlands in the Twente region	Tacitus
Tulingi		Possibly Celto-Germanic tribe		Julius Caesar
Tungri, Tungrians, Tungrii, Tongri	Tungri, Tongri	Opponents of Caesar in the 1st century BC	Left side of the Rhine around Tongeren	Julius Caesar, Tacitus
Turcilingi, Torcilingi, Thorcilingi	Turcilingae			
Turones, Turoni	Turoni	Possibly Celto-Germanic tribe, south and later southeast of the Chatti (see Thuringii above)		Ptolemy
Twihanti, Twihantes, Tuihanti, Tuihantes	Tuihanti			
Tylangii				
U
Ubii	Ubii	Originally east of the Rhine, subjected to Caesar and from the early imperial period on the west bank of the Rhine and Romanised	Originally from the Sieg over the Lahn to the lower Main, later in the area of Bonn and Cologne	
Ulmerugi				
Urugundes		Incursions around 256 into the Roman Empire	Lower Danube	Zosimus
Usipetes, Usipii	Usipetes, Usipii, Ousipetai (Ουσιπέται), Ousipioi (Ουσίπιοι)	In the 1st century BC, opponents of Caesar	On the right bank of the Lower Rhine	
V
Vagoths			Probably on Gotland	
Valagoths				
Vandals	Vandali, Vanduli, Vandaloi (Οὐανδαλοί), Wandeloi (Βανδῆλοι), Wandiloi (Βανδίλοι)	Originally in the northeastern Germania, during the Migration Period in Spain and North Africa, plunder of Rome 455	Probably Vendsyssel	
Vangiones	Vangiones	Affiliation to Celts or Germanic peoples uncertain	Area around Worms, Germany (Civitas Vangionum)	
Varangians		Similar to the Vikings' and Normans' name for the northern European Germanic people, who came on their journeys into contact with Slavic peoples (there also as Rus') and over the Volga and the Black Sea to Byzantium		
Varini		See Warini		
Varisci				
Victophalians				
Vidivarii	Vidivarii	According to Jordanes, a mixed people	At the mouth of the Vistula	Jordanes
Vinoviloth				
Viruni			Mecklenburg	
Visburgii	Wisburgi		Between the Upper Oder and the Vistula	
Visigoths, Thervingi	Visigothi, Wisigothae, Tervingi	Part of the Goths, plunder of Rome 410, Visigothic Kingdom in southwestern Gaul and Spain		Jordanes
Vispi			South of Caritner	
Vistula Veneti, Baltic Veneti, Veneti	Venedi, Venetae, Venedae	Possibly Germanic people in eastern Germania		
W
Waledungun				
Warini, Varini	Varini, Varinae, Ouarinoi (Ουαρίνοι)	Smaller, according to Tacitus, unwarlike tribe	Northern Germany, Warnemünde	Tacitus
West Herules, Westherules		Independent group of the Herules on the Black Sea, which looks like Roman auxiliary troops and in the 5th century like pirates in appearance		
Winnilers, Winnili, Winili		See Lombards		
X
Y
Z
Zumi				

== Linguistic predecessors ==
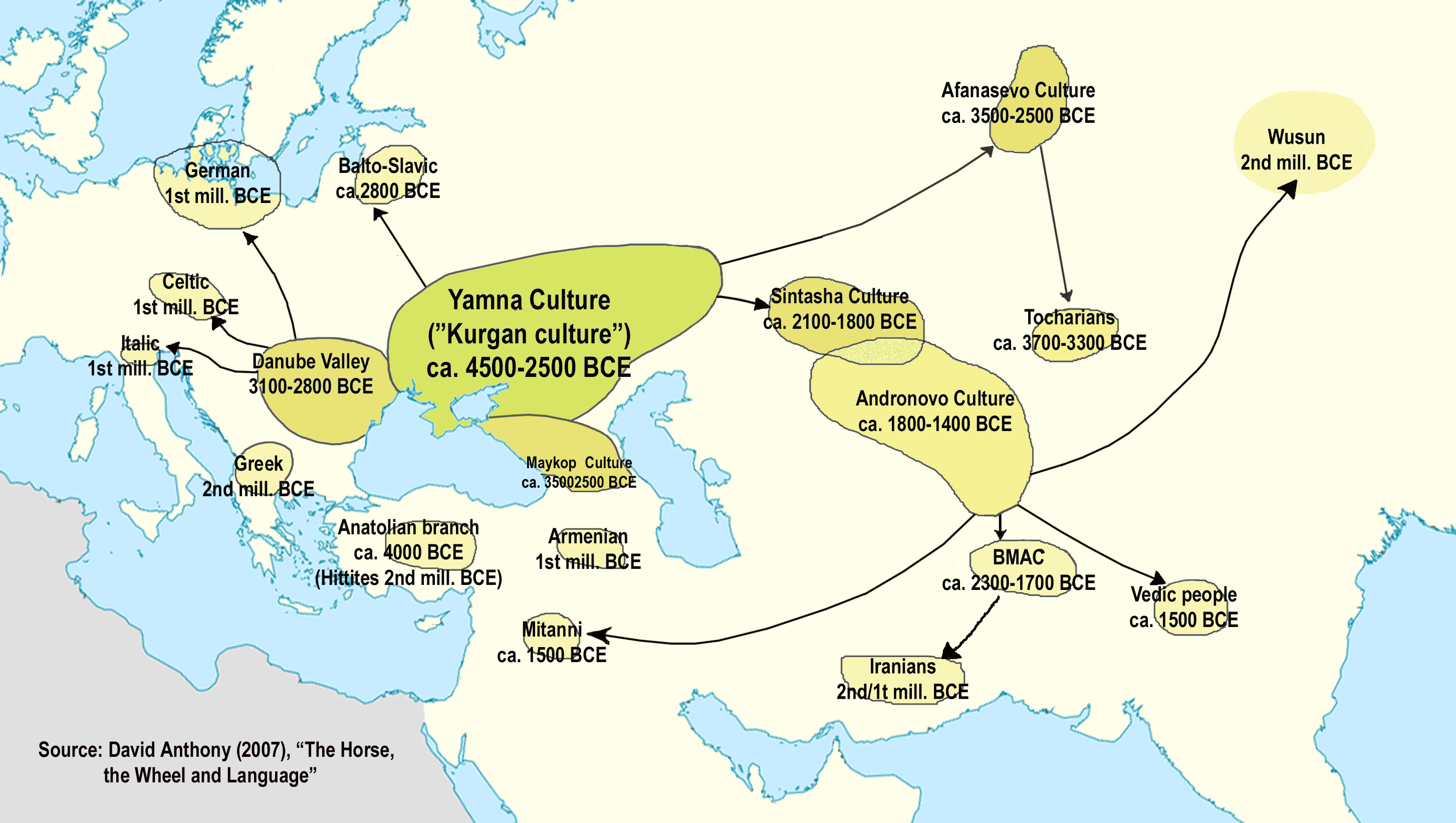
Map 1: Indo-European migrations as described in The Horse, the Wheel, and Language by David W. Anthony

- Proto-Indo-European speakers
  - Proto-Germanic speakers

== Possible ethnolinguistic kinship ==
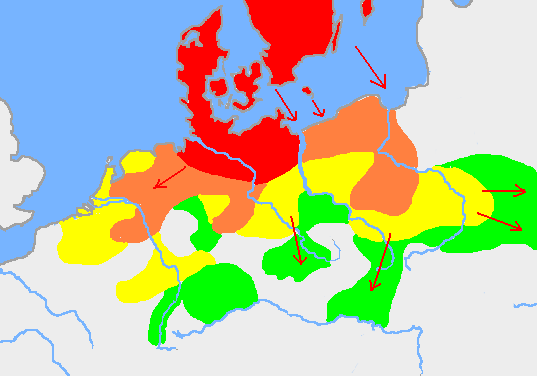
Expansion of early Germanic tribes into previously mostly Celtic Central Europe: Settlements before 750 BC New settlements by 500 BC New settlements by 250 BC New settlements by AD 1 Some sources also give a date of 750 BC for the earliest expansion out of southern Scandinavia and northern Germany along the North Sea coast towards the mouth of the Rhine.

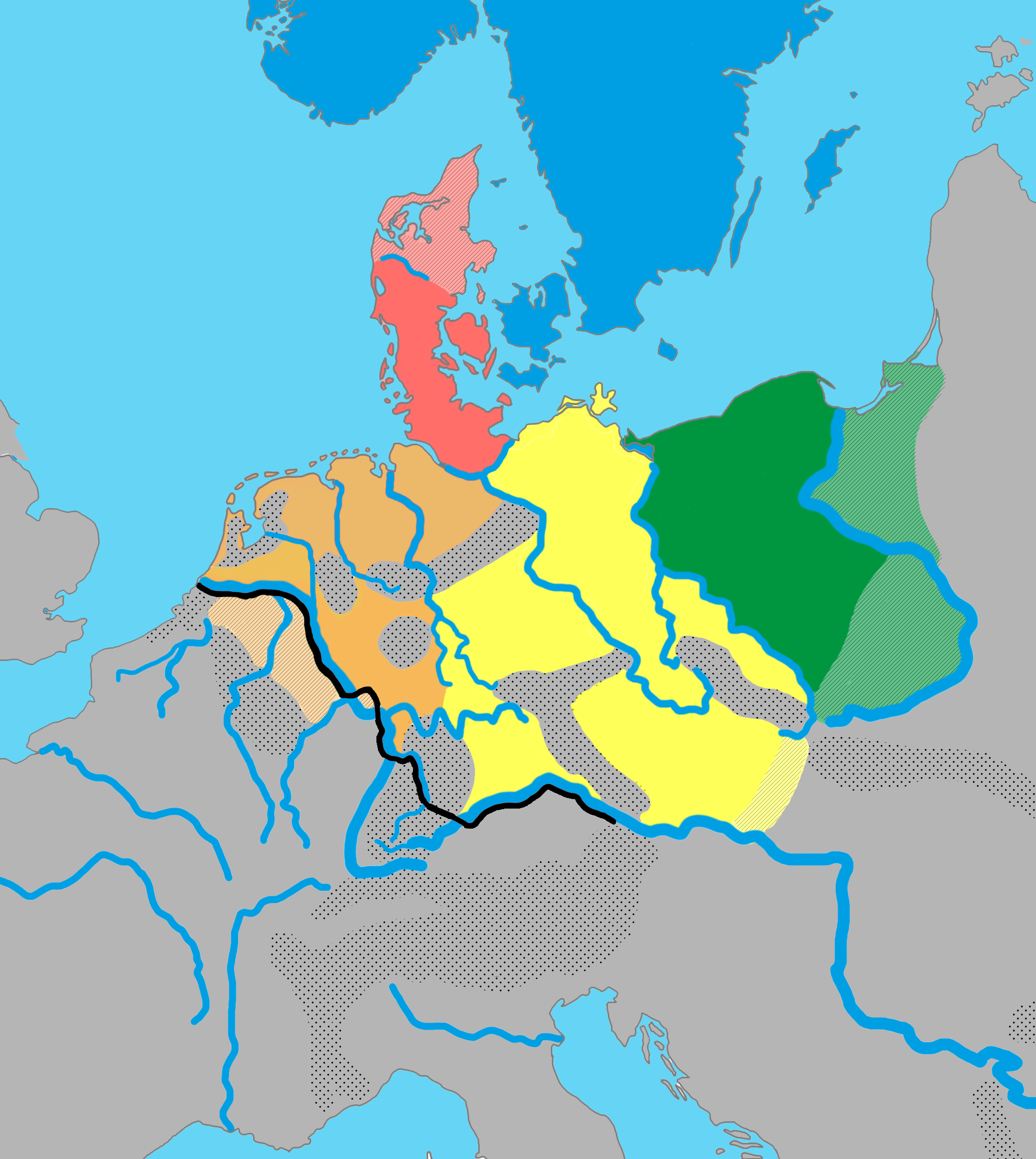
Map 3: One proposed theory for approximate distribution of the primary Germanic dialect groups, and matching peoples, in Europe around the year 1 AD: North Germanic peoples: North Germanic – Norsemen: Suiones/Swedes, Geats/Scandinavian Goths, Gutes, Danes, Raumarici, Arothi, Adogit, others West Germanic peoples: North Sea Germanic – Ingvaeonic peoples – Jutes, Angles, Saxons, Chauci, Frisians, others Weser–Rhine Germanic – Istvaeonic peoples: Franks, others Elbe Germanic – Herminonic/Irminonic peoples: Suebes/Alemanni, Swabians, Hermunduri/Thuringians, Marcomanni, Quadi, Bavarians, others East Germanic peoples: East Germanic – Vandilic peoples: Goths, Burgundians, Vandals, Gepids, Rugii, Buri, Herules, others

=== East Germanic peoples (Vandilians) ===
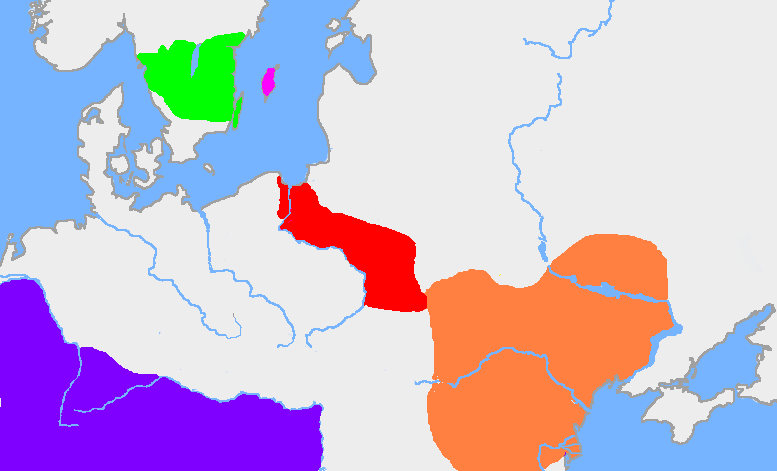
Map 4: Gothic associated regions and archaeological cultures Land of the Geats (Götaland) the island of Gotland Wielbark culture in the early 3rd century Chernyakhov culture, in the early 4th century Roman Empire

- Avarpi
- Burgundians / Burgundiones / Burgundes / Burgodiones (Frugundiones? may have been a variant of Burgundiones with the "B" as an "F" Furgundiones > Frugundiones) (Urugundes? may have been a variant of Burgundes without the initial "B" (B)urugundes > Urugundes, i.e. the Burgundians) (at the time of the Migration Period and Decline of the Roman Empire, they founded the Burgundian Kingdom) (Burgundians or part of them may have dwelt in Bornholm island for a time – old name of the island was Borgundarholm) (they were assimilated by the Gallo-Roman majority, however their ethnonym was the origin for the name of the region Burgundy – Bourgogne): Nibelungs (Old German) / Niflung (Old Norse), clan that was the Burgundian royal house known as Gibichungs (Old German) or Gjúkings (Old Norse)
- Goths / Gothones / Gutones / Gautae / Geats
  - Gepids
  - Goths / Hreidgoths
    - Gothi Minores
    - Greuthungi (direct ancestors or an older name of the Ostrogoths)
      - Ostrogoths / Hreiðgoths (at the time of the Migration Period and Decline of the Roman Empire, they founded the Ostrogothic Kingdom in Pannonia, northern Illyria and Italia) (they were assimilated by the Italo-Roman majority)
        - Crimean Goths (existed as a people until 16th and 17th centuries in southern Crimea Peninsula or Taurida Peninsula)
    - Thervingi (direct ancestors or an older name of the Visigoths)
      - Visigoths (at the time of the Migration Period and Decline of the Roman Empire, they founded the Visigothic Kingdom in Southern Gaul and Hispania) (they were assimilated by the Hispano-Roman majority)
- Herules, East Germanic (East Germanic Herules)
  - East Herules
  - West Herules
- Lemovii (=Turcilingi?) (also probably identical with Widsith's Glommas, Glomma or Glomman was the singular form)
- Lugians (Longiones?) (=Vandals?)
  - Buri (Lugi Buri) (part of the Buri accompanied the Suebi in their invasion of Hispania, the Iberian Peninsula, and established themselves in a mountainous area of modern northern Portugal in the 5th century. They settled in the region between the rivers Cávado and Homem, in the area known as Terras de Bouro (Lands of the Buri) – Bouros = Buri – Buros in the masculine accusative Latin declension)
  - Diduni (Lugi Diduni) / Dunii / Duni (Δοῦνοι – Doūnoi was the Greek variant of the Latin name)
  - Harii
  - Helisii / Elysii / Helusii / Hellusii
  - Manimi / Omani? / Omanii? (Lugi Omani?) (the Omani may have been the same as the Manimi)
  - Marsigni
  - Vandals / Vandilii (at the time of the Migration Period and Decline of the Roman Empire, they migrated towards West allied with a Sarmatian Iranian people, the Alans, and founded the Vandalic Kingdom first in the Southern and Western regions of Hispania, Iberian Peninsula, the Hasdingi Vandals, settled in Gallaecia, the Silingi vandals settled in Baetica, roughly today's Andalusia; sometime after many left Hispania, and migrated to North Africa) (they were assimilated by the Hispano-Roman majority in Hispania, however their ethnonym was the origin for the name of the region Andalusia – (V)andalusia and for the Arabic name of Hispania and the Iberian Peninsula – Al-Andalus) (they were assimilated by the Berber majority and African-Romans in North Africa, including the Moors, in the narrow sense, the descendants of the Mauri)
    - Asdingi / Astingi / Hasdingi (Haddingjar?)
    - Helvecones / Helveconae / Aelvaeones / Elouaiones (possibly the Ilwan and Eolas of Widsith; Eolas was the nominative plural and Eolum the dative plural)
    - Lacringes / Lacringi
    - Nahanarvali
    - Silingi (same as the Nahanarvali?) (at one point they lived in Silesia, and the name of this region could be derived from their ethnonym as well as, although indirectly, Andalusia – (V)andal-usia, where Silingi Vandals initially settled in Hispania)
    - Victohali / Victuali / Victabali
- Rugi / Rugii / / Ulmerugi / Variant Latin name for the Rugians: Rugiclei? / Greek names and variants for the Rugians: Rougíklioi / Routiklioi
- Sciri
  - Angisciri
- Sulones (may have been the same as the Silingi)
- Turcilingi / Torcolingi (may have been ancestors of part of the Thuringians)
- Vidivarii
- Visburgi / Visburgii

=== North Germanic peoples (Norsemen) ===
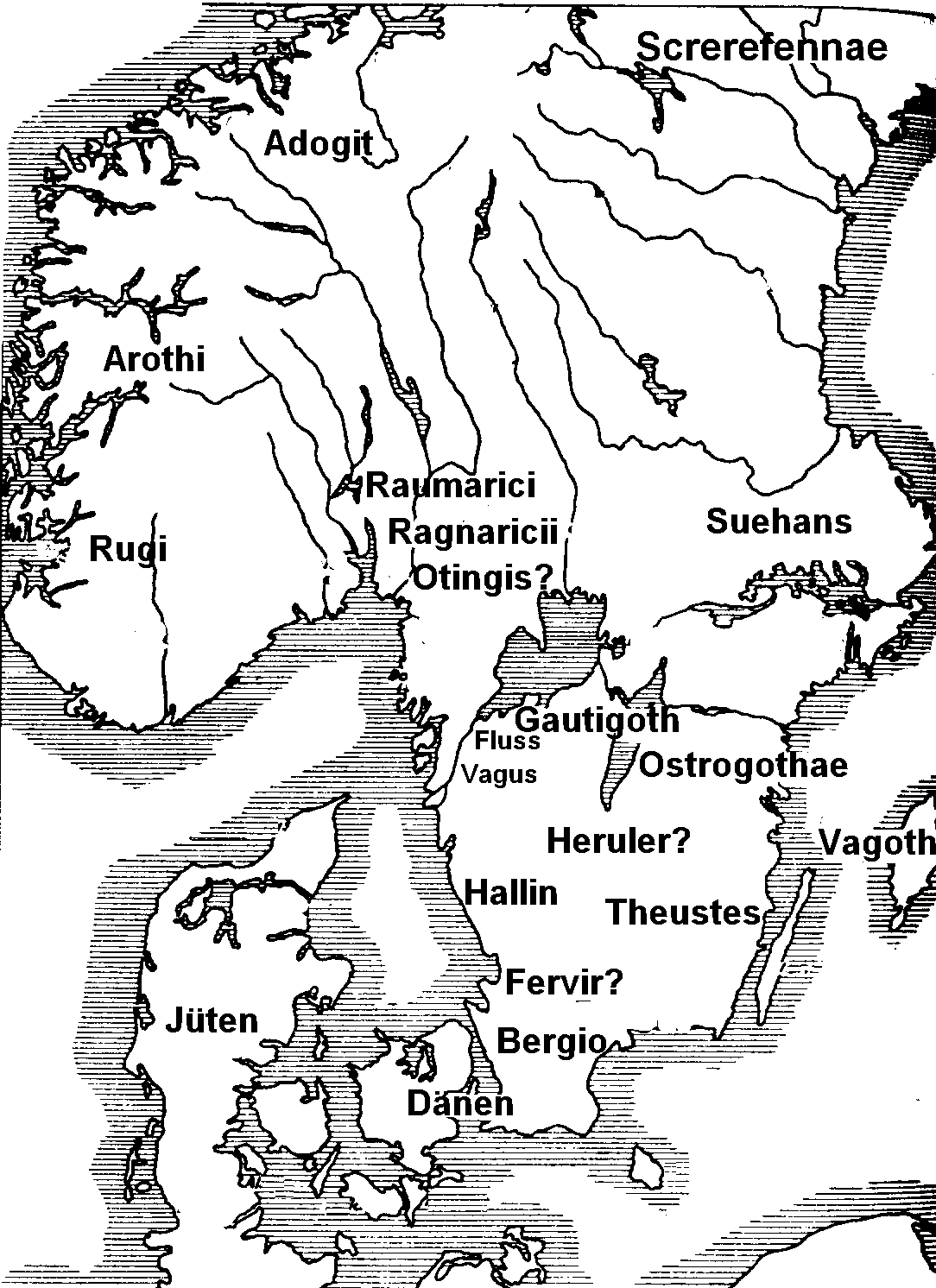
Map 5: Possible map of Scandza, with a selection of tribes

Map 6: Relief map of the Faroe Islands

Map 7: Travels of the first Scandinavians in Iceland during the ninth century AD or CE, Settlement of Iceland time

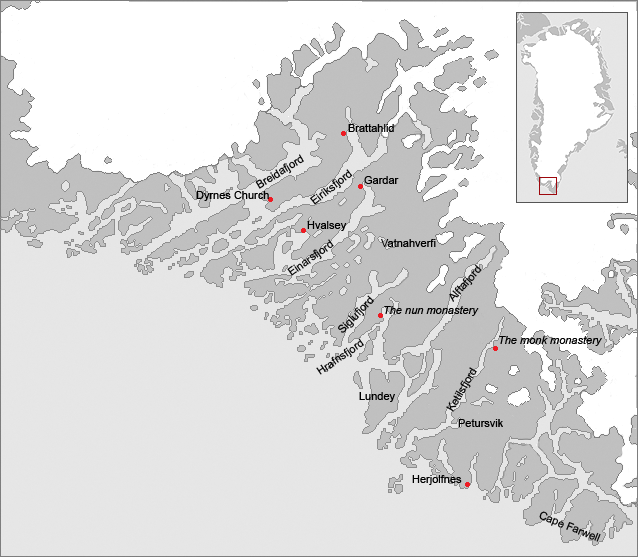
Map 8: A map of the Eastern Settlement on Greenland, covering approximately the modern municipality of Kujalleq. Eiriksfjord (Erik's fjord) and his farm Brattahlid are shown, as is the location of the bishopric at Garðar, Greenland.

- East North Germanic (East Scandinavians)
  - Ahelmil
  - Aviones / Chaibones / Eowan (more probably they lived in Öland island, southeastern Sweden, and not in Jutland Peninsula)
  - Bergio
  - Brondingas / Brondingar (Brondings) (East North Germanic tribe that lived in the island of Brännö, west of Gothenburg in the Kattegatt)
  - Danes (Germanic tribe): Scyldingas (Skjöldungar) clan
  - Dauciones
  - Eunixi
  - Evagreotingis / Evagres
  - Favonae
  - Fervir (in Fyæræ)
  - Finnaithae (old name for Finnveden, the name derives from an old Germanic word for hunters – finn, they were not necessarily Finnic or Saami) (they lived in Finnveden, Western Småland)
  - Firaesi / Phiraisoi
  - Gevlegas / Gevlegar (Gefflegas / Gevlegs) (East North Germanic tribe that dwelt in today's Gävleborg County)
  - Goths, Scandinavian (Scandinavian Goths)
    - Geats / Gautigoths, Scandinavian (Scandinavian Gautigoths) / Gautae
    - Ostrogothae, Scandinavian (Scandinavian Ostrogoths): Wulfings / Ylfings clan
    - Gutes / Gotlanders / Vagoths / Valagoths
  - Hallin / Hilleviones? (possibly they lived in Halland and were the same as the tribe called Hallin by Jordanes)
  - Hälsingas / Hälsingar (Hälsings) (East North Germanic tribe that lived in Hälsingland)
  - Herules, Scandinavian (Scandinavian Herules / Erules)
  - Hocings (tribe or clan of Hnæf, son of Hoc Healfdene – Hoc, the Half Dane, mentioned by Widsith, may have been the same chieftain known as Haki by the Norsemen, mentioned in the Ynglinga Saga)
  - Levoni / Levonii
  - Liothida
  - Mixi
  - Njars
  - Otingis
  - Sitones
  - Suðrmenn (in Södermanland)
  - Suiones / Sviones / Suehans / Suetidi / Suetides (ancient Swedes) (Svíar): Wægmunding clan; Ynglings / Scylfings clan (Scylfingas / Skilfingar)
    - Västermännen (in Västmanland) (Svionic tribe that lived to the west of Uppland) (not to be confused with the Vestmenn – Old Norse word for the Gaels of Ireland and Britain)
  - Virdar (in Småland)
  - Theustes
  - Vinili / Winnili / Vinoviloth (Scandinavian Lombards or Longobards or Langobards): Hundingas / Hundings clan?
  - Normans – they were formed by the merger and assimilation of a North Germanic-speaking minority and Frankish (West Germanic) minority with a Gallo-Roman majority, ethnogenesis of the native people inhabiting Normandy, in France
    - Anglo-Normans
- West North Germanic (West Scandinavians)
  - Adogit / Halogit / Háleygir (they lived in Hålogaland) (northernmost Germanic tribe)
  - Aprochi
  - Arothi ("Arochi")
  - Augandii / Augandzi (Egðir) / Augandxii (in Agder, southern Norway)
  - Chaedini / Chaedenoi (possibly in Hedemark / Hedmark)
  - Doelir (possibly a tribe that lived inland, in the valleys around Dalen, Telemark in Tokke Municipality, Telemark, many of the counties were based on older tribal lands or territories)
  - Filir / Fjalir
  - Firdir (tribe that lived in the northern part of today's Vestland county, Firdafylke was one of two historic counties, many of the counties were based on older tribal lands or territories)
  - Granni / Grenir
  - Haðar
  - Háleygir
  - Heinir / Heiðnir (Chaideinoi / Haednas) (in Hedmark, Norway)
  - Horðar (in Hordaland, known before as Hordafylke, many of the counties were based on older tribal lands or territories) (not originating from the Charudes/Harudes in Jutland)
  - Hringar (name means "rings", from hring – "ring")
  - Lidingar / Lidingas
  - Jamtr / Jamtar
  - Ragnaricii / Aeragnaricii
  - Rani / Ranii / Renir
  - Raumarici / Raumariciae / Raumar (Heatho-Reams of Widsith) (they lived in today's Romerike)
  - Rugi, Scandinavian (Scandinavian Rugi) / Rygir (Holmrygir of Widsith)
  - Taetel
  - Throwenas / Throwenar (Throwens of Widsith) (West North Germanic tribe that possibly dwelt in Trøndelag)
  - Wrosnas (mentioned by Widsith as a tribe ruled by Holen, possibly from Holen)
  - Old Faroese / Old Faroe Islanders (formed by the merger of several West North Germanic tribes with the addition of Celtic Gaels that settled in the Faroe islands)
  - Old Icelanders (formed by the merger of several West North Germanic tribes with the addition of Celtic Gaels that settled in Iceland) (they were organized in clans in the Icelandic Commonwealth – Icelandic clans: Ásbirningar; Haukdælir; Oddaverjar; Sturlungar; Svínfellingar; Vatnsfirðingar)
    - Greenland Norsemen (mainly descendants from Old Icelanders that settled in Norse Greenland)
  - Vikings (in the Western Europe) / Varangians (in the Eastern Europe) (generic word for warriors, marauders and traders of Scandinavian or Norse i.e. North Germanic origin that went to or returned from other lands regardless of the tribe, they were not a specific Norse tribe or a Norse ethnic group, their arising in History is called Viking Age) (they contributed to the formation of the Rus’ people and Kievan Rus' loose federation that was ruled by the Varangian Rurik dynasty) / Ascomanni (name for the Vikings by Adam of Bremen)

=== West Germanic peoples ===
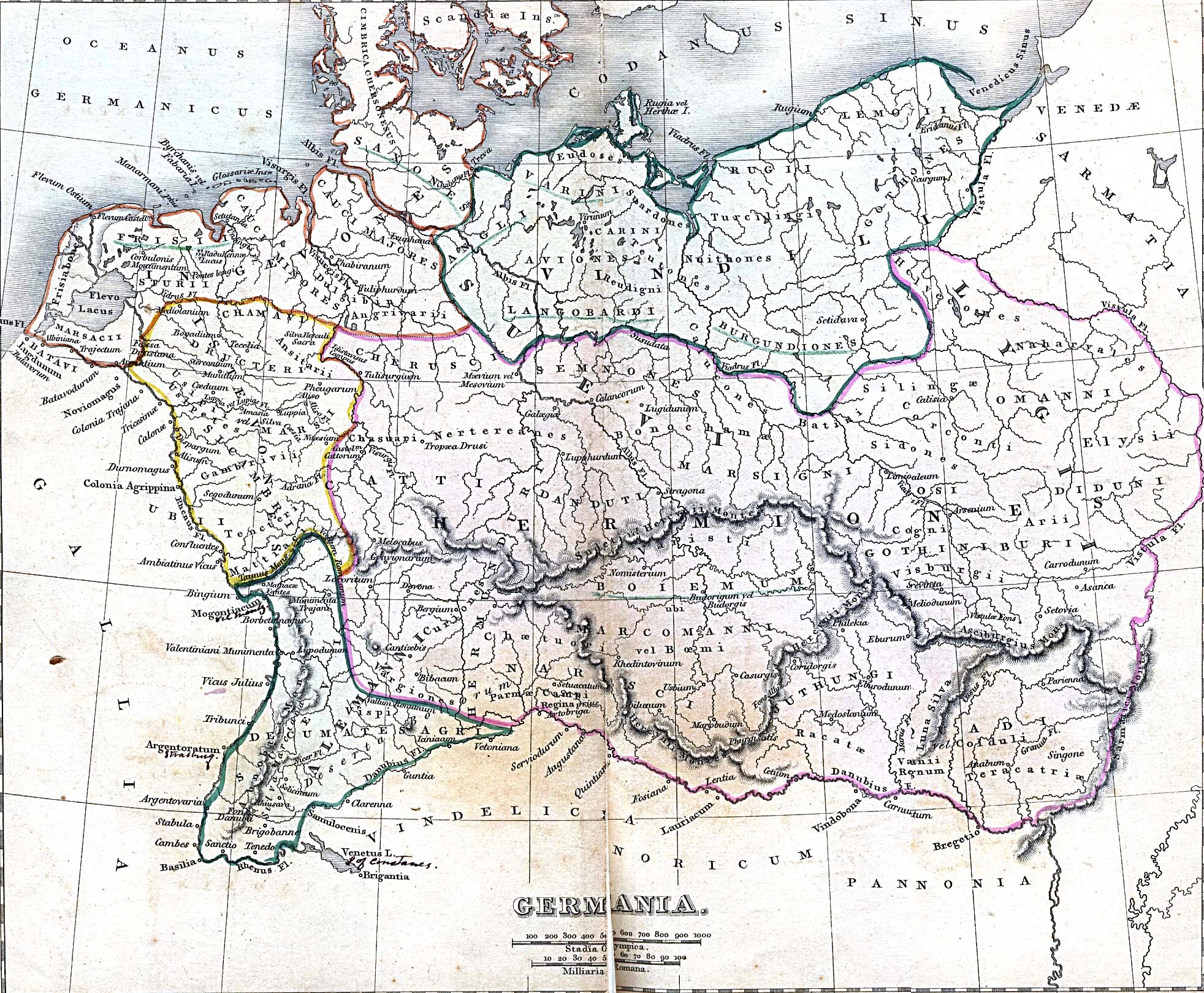
Map 9: Depiction of Magna Germania in the early 2nd century including the location of many ancient Germanic peoples and tribes (by Alexander George Findlay 1849)

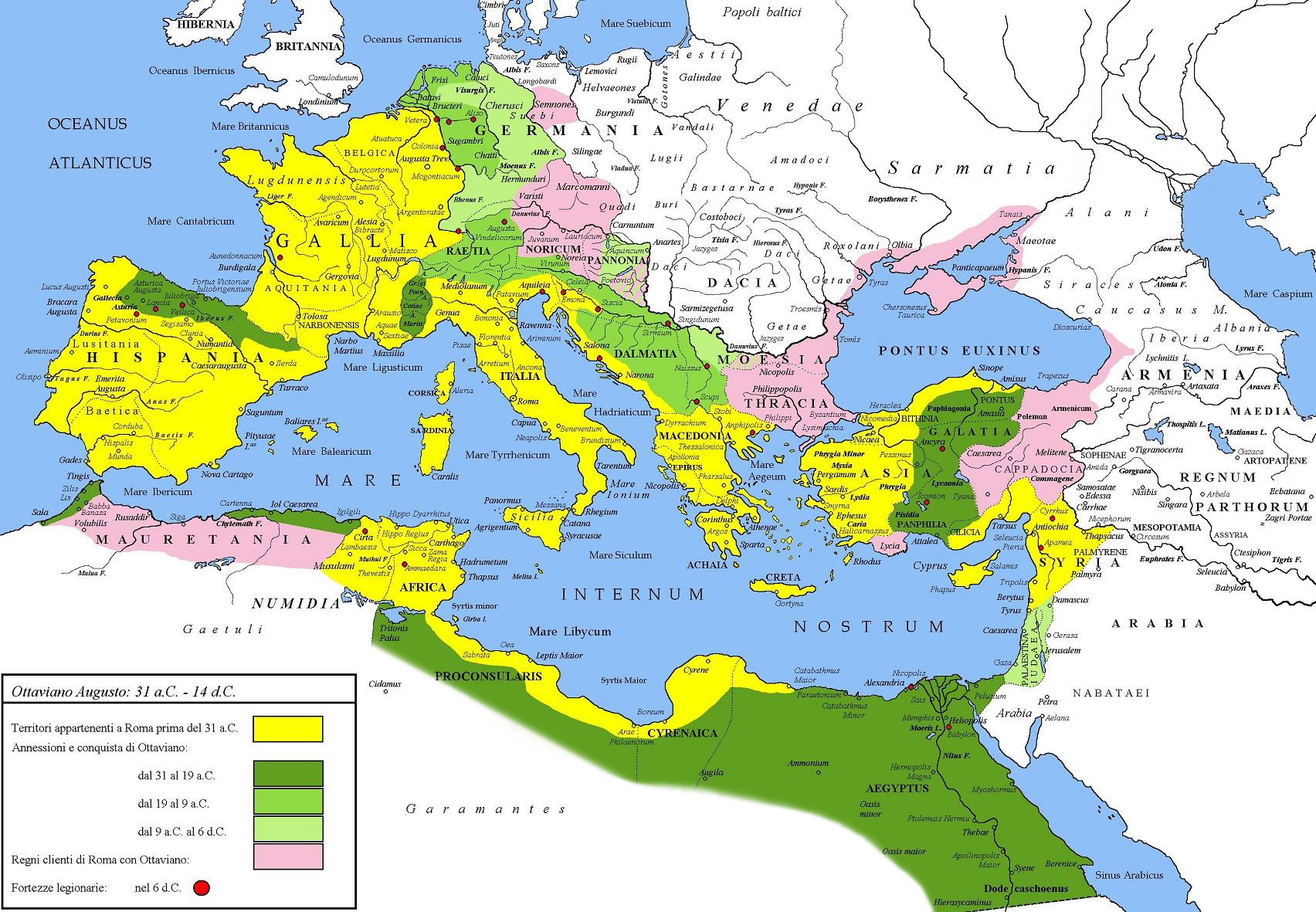
Map 10: Early Roman Empire with some ethnic names in and around Germania

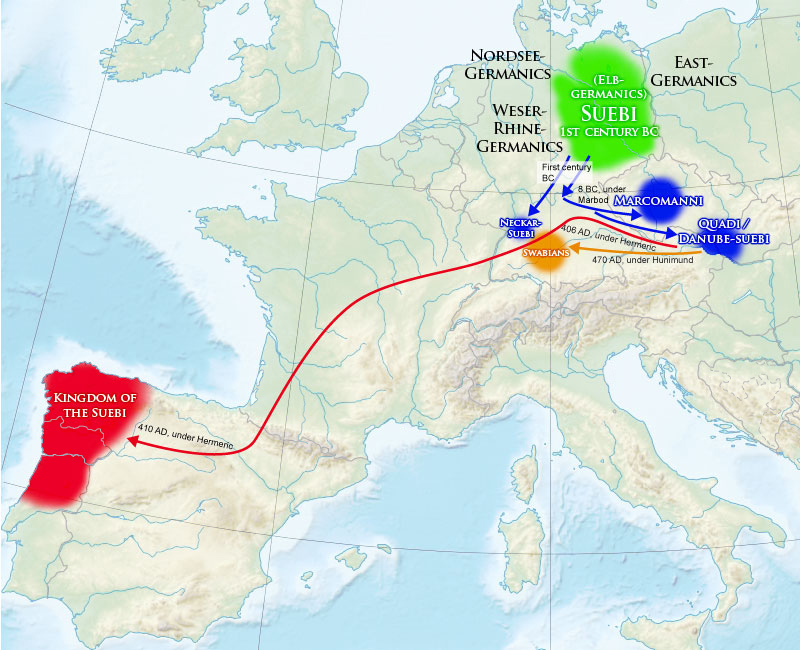
Map 11: Suebic migrations across Europe

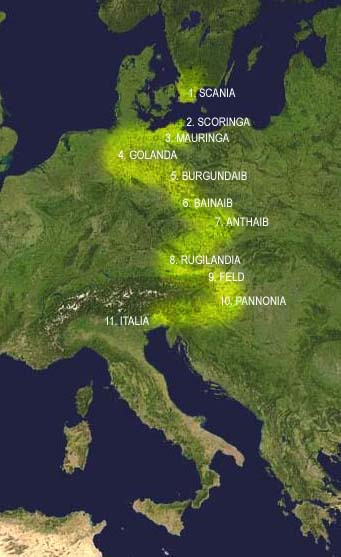
Map 12: Lombard migration from Scandinavia

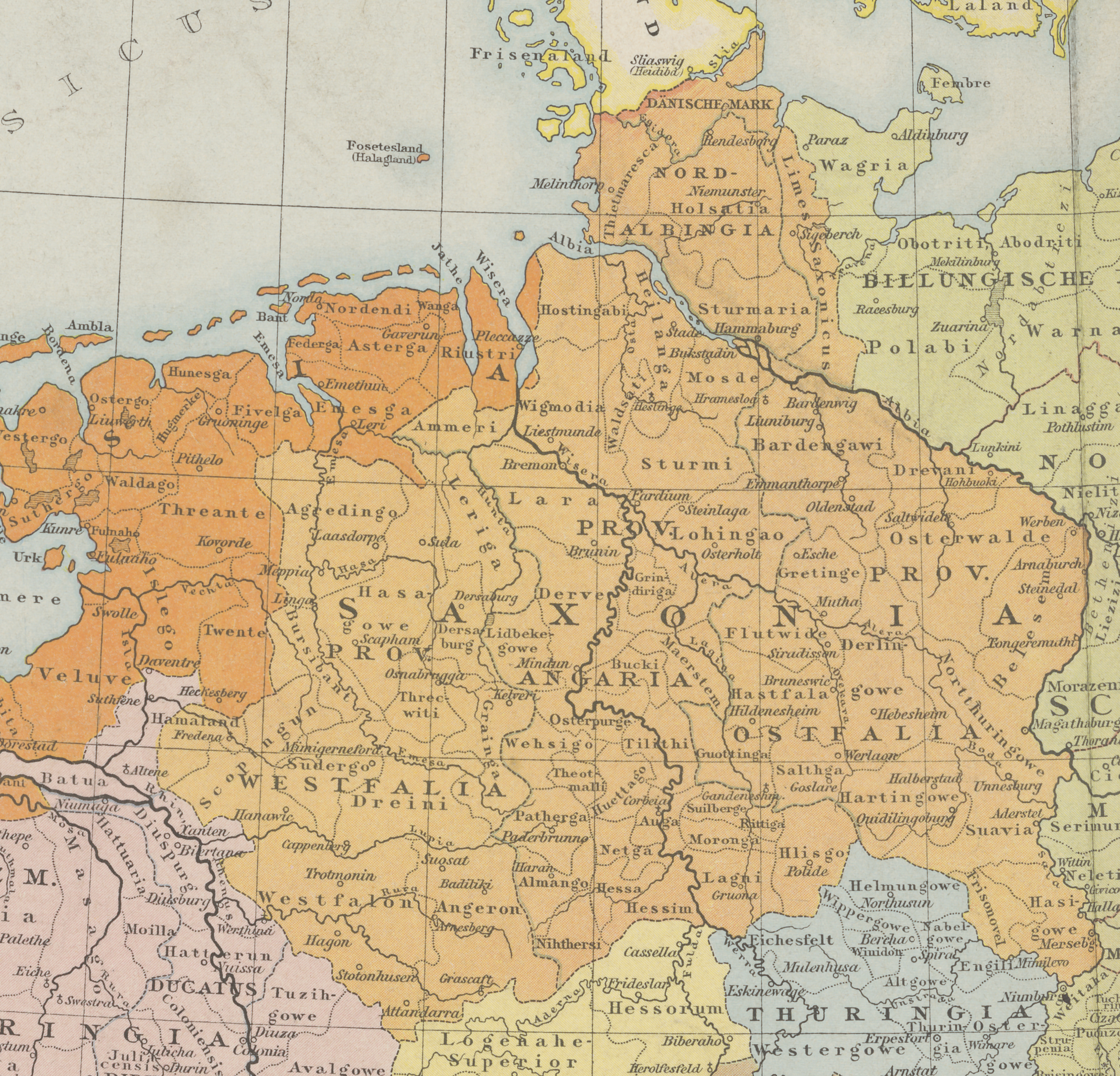
Map 13: Old Saxony. The later stem duchy of Saxony (circa 1000 AD), which was based in the Saxons' traditional homeland bounded by the rivers Ems, Eider and Elbe. Saxon tribes (after later Saxon expansion) and their lands are also shown.

Map 14: Migration of Angles, Saxons and Jutes towards Britannia, today's England, and their settlement in the 5th and 6th centuries AD

Map 15: The tribes of the Tribal Hidage. Where an appropriate article exists, it can be found by clicking on the name.

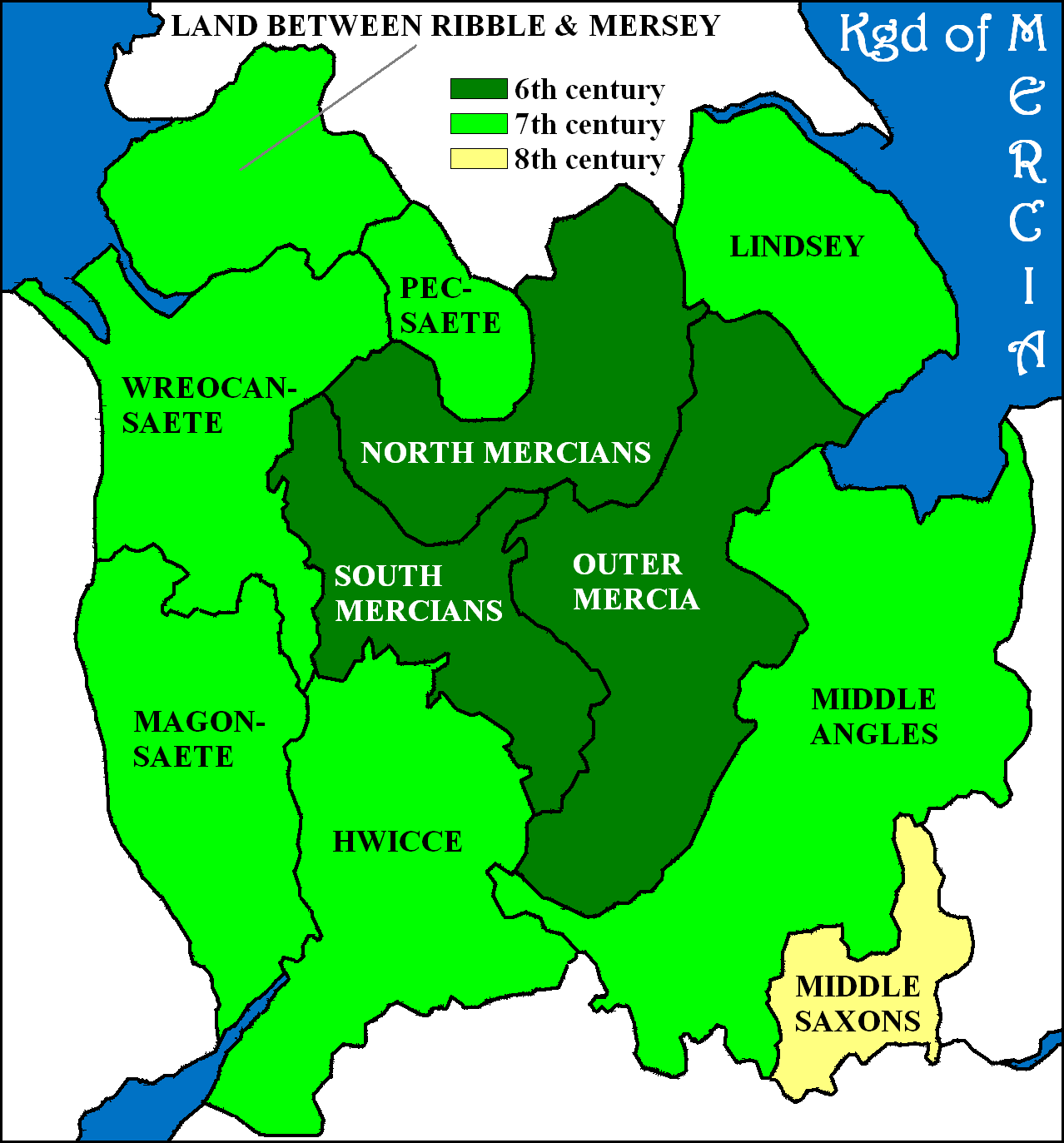
Map 16: Subdivisions of Mercia, almost all of them matched Middle Anglian individual tribes or groups of tribes, except for the Middle Saxons; see Tribal Hidage

Map 17: Approximate location of the original Frankish tribes in the 3rd century (in green)

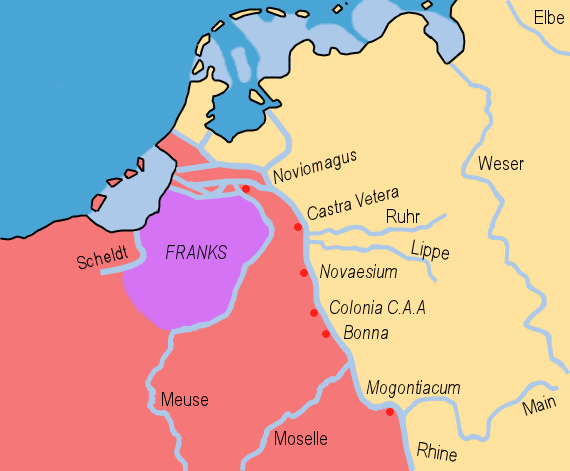
Map 18: Salian settlement in Toxandria in 358 where Julian the Apostate made them dediticii Roman Empire Salian Franks Germanic tribes east of the Rhine

- Elbe Germani (Herminones / Hermiones / Irminones)
  - Baemi-Baenochaemae
    - Baemi / Baimoi
    - Baenochaemae / Banochaemae
  - Bateinoi
  - Calucones (ancient Germanic tribe, not to be confuse with the Calucones, a Rhaetian tribe)
  - Caritni / Carini
  - Chatti-Mattiaci (originally they were an Elbe Germanic people later assimilated by the Istvaeones or Wesser-Rhine peoples, it was by the merger of the Istvaeones tribes with the Chatti and related tribes that the Franks were formed)
    - Chatti / Hatti (their ethnonym may have originated the name Hesse by phonetic change over time)
    - Mattiaci
    - Batavi-Cananefates
      - Batavi
      - Cananefates / Canninefates
  - Chasuarii / Hasuarii (closely related or not to the Chatti)
  - Chattuarii / Attoarii / Hattuarii / Hetware (possibly mentioned in Beowulf as Hetwaras) (they lived in Hettergouw or Hetter gouw) (closely related or not to the Chatti)
  - Chatvores
  - Cherusci (some were assimilated by the Mainland Saxons to the north)
  - Fosi
  - Marvingi / Marouingoi
  - Suebes / Suebi or Alemanni (synonymous with the Suebes in the broad sense) (large tribal confederation)
    - Brisgavi
    - Bucinobantes
    - Butones / Boutones
    - Corconti
    - Hermunduri
      - Armalausi
      - Campi (tribe on the river Cham or Chamb, tributary of the Regen, close to Cham city)
        - Adrabaecampi / Campi
        - Parmaecampi
      - Curiones
      - Danduti
      - Vangiones / Vargiones / Woingas (of Widsith)
      - Thuringians (Thuringii / Toringi) (formed by the merging of Hermunduri tribes, a tribal confederation part of the Elbe Germanic peoples) (some Turcilingi or Torcolingi were assimilated to the Thuringians) (some Thuringians joined the Longobardian migration towards south)
        - Graffelti (a late Thuringian tribe that lived in Grabfeld)
    - Lentienses
    - Lombards / Langobards / Longobards (Vinili) (Elbe Germanic Lombards) (they lived in Lüneburg Heath) (at the time of the Migration Period and Decline of the Roman Empire, they founded the Lombard Kingdom) (they were assimilated by the Italo-Roman majority, however their ethnonym was the origin for name of the region Lombardy – Lombardia)
      - Bardes
      - Heaðobards / Hadubardes / Heaðubeardan (Headubarden)
    - Marcomanni
      - Baiuvarii (Bavarians)
    - Mugilones
    - Nertereanes
    - Quadi / Coldui / Danube Suebi
      - Old Swabians (Danube Suebi that migrated westward) (they had a close relation with the Upper Rhine Alemanni and were descendants from common ancestors but they migrated in an East towards West migration route through the Danube from what is today's Moravia and from there from the Elbe basin in even older times, until they settled in Swabia) (ancestors of Swabian German speakers)
      - Suebi, Gallaecian (Gallaecian Suebi) (at the time of the Migration Period and Decline of the Roman Empire, they founded the Kingdom of the Suebi in Gallaecia, Northwestern Iberian Peninsula, roughly in today's Galicia, North Portugal and North Central Portugal, Asturias and León) (Suevos)
    - Racatriae / Racatae
    - Raetovari
    - Scotingi
    - Sedusii (a Germanic tribe that dwelled across the eastern region of the Rhine river and was part of the Suebic tribal confederation, mentioned by Julius Caesar)
    - Semnones
      - Iuthungi / Juthungi (descendants of the Semnones)
    - Sibini
    - Sidini
    - Suarines / Suardones (they may have lived in Schwerin region)
    - Suebi Nicrenses / Suebi, Neckar (Neckar Suebi) / Nictrenses / Upper Alemanni (Upper Rhine Alemanni, ancestors of Alemannic German speakers – Alemanni in the narrow sense) (they had a close relation with the Old Swabians and were descendants from common ancestors but they migrated in a direct North towards South migration route from the Elbe basin until they settled in Alemannia or Alamannia and Eastern Upper Burgundy, roughly in today's Western and Western Central Baden-Wurtenberg – Neckar river basin, Baden, Alsace, Lake Constance – Bodensee region, and Central Switzerland): Ahalolfings or Alaholfings
    - Sudini
    - Teuriochaemae / Teuriochaimai
    - Triboci
    - Varisti / Varisci / Narisci / Naristi
    - Victophalians / Victofalians / Victophali / Victofali
    - Zumi
  - Teutonari / Teutonoari
  - Varini / Warini / Auarinoi (may have been the same as the Varini, a variant name in Greek) / Viruni / Quirounoi? or Oúírounoi (possibly a mistaken transliteration of the Greek Ούίρουνοι = Oúírounoi – Viruni in Latin) / Warni / Viruni / Pharodini? / Farodini? (may have been the same as the Varini or Viruni)
- North Sea Germani (Ingaevones / Ingvaeones)
  - Ambrones (possibly the Imbers / Ymbers / Ymbrum of Widsith, tribe that dwelt in Jutland or in the Emmer (Ambriuna) river region; also they could have lived in the Island of Amrum, in the Atlantic coast, or in the island of Imbra, now known as Fehmarn, in the Baltic coast)
  - Ampsivarii / Amsivarii
  - Angles / Anglies
    - Island Angles / Insular Angles (in England they merged with Saxons and Jutes to form the new ethnolinguistic group of the Anglo-Saxons)
    - Mainland Angles / Continental Angles (later assimilated by the Danes in Angeln, Schleswig, North part of Schleswig-Holstein and by Frisians, North Frisians, in Southern Jutland Peninsula Atlantic coast and islands) (Aglies? a possible variant of the name Angles)
  - Anglevarii / Angrivarii (Angrarii / Angarii) (later assimilated by the Saxons)
  - Angrivarii (Angrarii / Angarii) (later assimilated by the Saxons)
  - Caulci (possibly a North Sea Germanic tribe mentioned by Strabo, he wrote that they lived close to the Ocean – the North Sea, they are mentioned along with North Sea Germanic tribes – Ingaevones)
  - Chali / Hallinger
  - Charudes / Harudes / Arochi
  - Chaubi (possibly a North Sea Germanic tribe mentioned by Strabo, he wrote that they lived close to the Ocean – the North Sea, they are mentioned along with North Sea Germanic tribes – Ingaevones)
  - Chauci
    - Chauci Maiores
    - Chauci Minores / Hugas (Saxon Hugas)
  - Cherusci (some were assimilated by the Mainland Saxons)
  - Cobandi
  - Cimbri / Cymbri
  - Dulgibini / Dulgubnii
  - Eudoses / Eutes / Euthiones (ancestors of the Jutes or a variant name of "Jutes"; Eutes > Iutes > Yutes > Jutes) (Endoses? possibly a variant of the name "Eudoses")
    - Jutes
      - Island Jutes (in England they merged with the Angles and Saxons to form the new ethnolinguistic group of the Anglo-Saxons)
      - Mainland Jutes (later assimilated by the Danes in Jutland, today's Mainland Denmark)
  - Frisii
    - Frisiavones / Frisiabones (Frisii Minores)
    - Frisii (Frisii Maiores) (possible ancestors of the Frisians)
      - Old Frisians
  - Fundusi (a Germanic tribe that lived in Jutland)
  - Guiones (a tribe mentioned by the Massiliot Greek sea traveler and explorer Pytheas in his work – The Ocean that possibly lived in Jutland)
  - Hæleþan (Haelethan) (tribe that lived near the Randers Firth in North Jutland)
  - Nuithones / Nuitones
  - Sabalingioi / Sabalingi
  - Saxons (Old Saxons)
    - Island Saxons / Insular Saxons (in England they merged with the Angles and Jutes to form the new ethnolinguistic group of the Anglo-Saxons)
    - Mainland Saxons / Continental Saxons (the variants Ga, Gao, Gau, Gabi, Go, Gowe, Gouw, Ge were the word for Gau – Old Saxon or Old Low German and Old High German term (in modern times Kreis) equivalent of the English Shire, regional administration, many times they matched a tribal land or territory, Old English had some traces, some Germanic cognates like Ga / Gа̄ or Ge, of this meaning which was ousted by Old English Scire – Shire, from an early time)
      - Agradingun (same as the Angrivarii or Angarii)
      - Myrgingas / Myrgings (tribe of Widsith, the wandering bard)
      - Later Saxons (after merger and assimilation of several North Sea Germanic and Elbe Germanic peoples and tribes)
        - Nordalbingi (Nordalbingians) / Nordliudi / Transalbingians (North of the Elbe, called before Alba or Albis river, in Holstein) (the original land of the Saxons) (their land included the Limes Saxonicus and the Danish March)
          - Holtsaetan / Holtsaeten / Holtsati / Holsatians / Holcetae (Holt Saetan – "Forest / Wood Settlement" or "Forest / Wood Settlers" – from which Holstein originate its name, and not from "Forest Stone") (a Nordalbingian tribe, North of the Elbe river, part of the Saxon tribal confederation)
          - Thietmaresca / Thiadmariska / Men of Ditmarsch (in Dithmarschen)
          - Sturmarians (Sturmarii / Sturmera)
          - Bardi / Bardongavenses (they lived in Bardengawi / Barden gawi / Bardengau or Barden Gau)
        - Angarians / Angrians (same as the Angrivarii or Angarii) (in Angaria) (in the plain of Old Saxony south of the Elbe and along Weser river valley)
          - Agradingun / Agradine (lived in Agradingo / Agradingo go)
          - Almangas (they lived in Almango or Almango go)
          - Ammeri
          - Bursibani
          - Bucki
          - Dersi
          - Derve
          - Heilungun (they lived in Heilanga / Heilanga ga)
          - Hessi (in Hessa) (a North Hessian tribe assimilated by the Mainland Saxons)
          - Hlisgas (they lived in Hlisgo or Hlisgo go)
          - Hostingabi / Hostinga (they lived in Hostingabi / Hostinga gabi)
          - Huettas (they lived in Huettago or Huetta go)
          - Lagni
          - Lara
          - Lidbeke (they lived in Lidbekegowe or Lidbeke gowe)
          - Lohingi (they lived in Lohingao or Lohingi gao)
          - Moronas (they lived in Moronga or Moron ga)
          - Mosde
          - Netga / Nete (they lived in Netga or Net ga)
          - Pathergi / Padergi (they lived in Patherga or Pather ga)
          - Sturmi
          - Tilithi
          - Waldseti / Waldseton
          - Wehsige (in Wehsigo or Wehsi go)
          - Wigmodia / Wihmodi (Bremon, today's Bremen was in their land)
        - Phalians (in Phalia) (in the plateau of Old Saxony)
          - Eastphalians (Ostfalahi) (in Eastphalia)
            - Derlinas (they lived in Derlingowe or Derlin Gowe – Derlingau or Derlin Gau)
            - Flutwide
            - Frisonovel
            - Gretingun / Gretingas (they lived in Gretinga / Gretinga ga)
            - Guottingi / Guddinges / Gotingi (a Gothic tribe that merged and assimilated to the Saxons) (they lived in Guotinga or Guotinga ga or Gotinga ga, Göttingen region)
            - Hartinas (lived in Hartingowe or Hartin gowe)
            - Hasi (they lived in Hasigowe or Hasi gowe)
            - Hastfalon / Astfalon (they lived in Hastfalagowe or Hastfala gowe)
            - Maerstem
            - Nordsuavi (in Suavia) (a Northern Suebi / Suevi tribe that merged and assimilated to the Saxons)
            - Nortthuringun (a Northern Thuringian tribe that merged and assimilated to the Saxons) (lived in Nortthuringowe or Nort Thurin gowe)
            - Salthgas (they lived in Salthga or Salth ga)
          - Westphalians (Westfalahi / Westfali) (in Westphalia)
            - Angeron (they lived in Angeron)
            - Auas (they lived in Auga or Au ga)
            - Dreini (they lived in Dreini)
            - Grainas (they lived in Grainga or Grain ga)
            - Hama (a tribe descendant of the Chamavi / Hamavi, a Rhine-Weser Germanic tribe, one component of the Franks, that was later assimilated by the Mainland Saxons) (they lived in Hamaland or Hama land)
            - Hasi (they lived in Hasagowe)
            - Lerige (lived in Lerige or Leri ge)
            - Nihthersi
            - Scopingun
            - Sudergo (lived in Sudergo or Suder go)
            - Theotmalli
            - Threcwiti
            - Westfalon proper
        - Aringon
        - Firihsetan / Virsedi
        - Sahslingun
        - Scotelingun
        - Steoringun
        - Thiadmthora
        - Waledungun
  - Reudigni / Rendingi / Randingi / Rondingas / Rondings / Reudignes / Reudingi / Reudinges
  - Singulones / Sigulones
  - Sturii (a Germanic tribe that lived south of the Frisii)
  - Teutones (Teutons)
  - Anglo-Jutes-Saxons (Anglian-Jutish-Saxonian tribes, organized in Tribal Hidages, tribal lands) (new ethnolinguistic group formed by migration toward and settlement of Germanic tribes in Britannia, today's England, and also by assimilation of the conquered British Celts)
    - Angles (Island Angles)
      - Northumbrians (North of the Humber estuary)
        - Amoþingas / Amothingas (Emmotland in Yorkshire, anciently Aet Eamotum, perhaps also Amotherley, also in Yorkshire)
        - Beodarsæte (Anglian tribe that lived in Sunderland region)
        - Elmedsætan / Elmetsaete (Elmet)
        - Loidis (Anglian tribe that lived in Leeds region)
      - Southumbrians (South of the Humber estuary)
        - East Angles / East Anglians (in East Anglia)
          - Herstingas (Anglian tribe that lived in Cambridge region)
          - Ikelgas (Anglian tribe that lived in Icklingham region)
          - Norfolk (Anglian tribe – "North folk" of East Anglia that lived in Norfolk region)
          - Suffolk (Anglian tribe – "South folk" of East Anglia that lived in Suffolk region)
        - Middle Angles / Midlanders (in Mercia, roughly today's Midlands)
          - East Middle Angles / Middle Angles Proper (roughly in today's Cambridgeshire, Bedfordshire, Hertfordshire, Buckinghamshire and South Oxfordshire)
            - Bilmingas / Bilmigas (part of south Lincolnshire)
            - Cilternsæte / Cilternsætan (Settlers of Chiltern Hills – Middle Anglian tribe or clan)
            - Dornwaras (Settlers of river Dorn – Middle Anglian tribe or clan)
            - Færpingas / Feppingas / Faerpinga in Middelenglum (Charlbury and near Thame)
            - Giflas / Gifle (River Ivel, near Bedford)
            - Gyrwas / Gyrwe (Angle tribe or clan that dwelt in the fen) (in the Fens) (near Peterborough region)
              - North Gyrwas / North Gyrwe
              - Suth Gyrwas / Suth Gyrwe
                - Elge (Anglian tribe that lived in Elge – Isle of Ely)
            - Hiccas / Hicce (around today's Hitchin)
            - Hurstingas (River Ivel, near Bedford)
            - Spaldas / Spaldingas (Anglian tribe that lived in Spalding region)
            - Sweordoras (Whittlesey Mere)
            - Wideringas (near Stamford)
            - Wigestas
            - Willas / Wille
              - East Willas / East Wille
              - West Willas / West Wille
            - Wixnas
              - East Wixnas
              - West Wixnas
          - Lindisfaras (Anglian tribe that lived in Lindisfarona Tribal Hidage, Lindsey and North Lincolnshire)
            - Gaininingas / Gaini (Gainsborough, Lincolnshire)
            - Lindisfarningas (an outlier tribe that lived in the Lindisfarne island and region in the Northumbrian coast)
          - Mercians / Mercians Proper (they founded the Kingdom of Mercia, with Mercian conquests of other Middle Angles in the 7th and 8th centuries AD, "Mercian" and "Middle Angles" became almost synonymal)
            - North Mercians (the Mercians dwelling north of the River Trent, roughly in today's East Staffordshire, Derbyshire and Nottinghamshire)
              - Reagesate (Anglian tribe that lived in Repton)
              - Snotingas (Anglian tribe that occupied the settlement of Snottengaham or Snodengaham – modern Nottingham, Nottinghamshire)
            - South Mercians (the Mercians dwelling south of the River Trent, roughly in today's South Staffordshire and North Warwickshire)
              - Beormingas (Anglian tribe that lived in Birmingham region)
              - Bilsaete (Bilston)
              - Pencersaete (Penkridge)
              - Tomsaete (Tamworth, Staffordshire)
            - Outer Mercians (an early phase of Mercian expansion, possibly 6th century AD, roughly in today's South Lincolnshire, Leicestershire, Rutland, Northamptonshire and North Oxfordshire)
              - Undalas (Anglian tribe that lived in Undaium region, modern-day Oundle, in Northamptonshire)
              - Wideriggas
          - Pecsæte / Pecsætan (Anglian tribe that lived in today's Peak District, roughly in North Derbyshire)
            - Herefinnas (Derbyshire)
          - Hwiccians / Hwincas (Hwicce) (roughly in today's Gloucestershire, Worcestershire and South Warwickshire)
            - Arosæte / Arosaetan (in and around today's Droitwich Spa, Arosætna Tribal Hidage)
            - Duddensaete (Dudley)
            - Husmerae (Kidderminster)
            - Stoppingas (Anglian tribe that lived in Wootton Wawen and the valley of the River Alne in modern-day Warwickshire)
            - Weorgoran (Worcester)
          - Westernas
            - Magonsæte / Magonsætan (roughly in today's Herefordshire and South Shropshire)
              - Hahlsæte (Ludlow)
              - Temersæte (Hereford)
            - Wreocensæte (Wrekinsets) (Wrēocensǣte, Wrōcensǣte, Wrōcesǣte, Wōcensǣte, Wocansaete) (Anglian tribe that lived in Wocansaetna Tribal Hidage) (roughly in today's Northern Shropshire, Flintshire and Cheshire)
              - Meresæte (in and around Chester)
              - Rhiwsæte (in and around Wroxeter, Shropshire)
            - Tribes of the Land Between Ribble and Mersey (Anglian tribes that lived in what is today's Merseyside, in the Mersey Valley Land, today's Manchester and Liverpool region – Greater Manchester, and in south of the Ribble Valley Land, today's South Lancashire, roughly today's Lancashire) (a disorganized region under Mercian control from the 7th century AD)
    - Jutes (Island Jutes)
      - Cantwara / Centingas (Kentish / Kentish Men, in Cantwarena Tribal Hidage, Kent)
        - Andredes Leag (Jute tribe that lived in Andredsley and Newenden region in Kent)
        - Boroware (Jute tribe that lived in Canterbury region)
        - Ceasterware (Jute tribe that lived in Rochester, Kent region)
        - Eastorege (Jute tribe that lived in Sandwich, Kent region)
        - Limenwara
        - Merscware (Dwellers of Romney Marsh, Kent)
      - Wihtwara (Wight Islanders) (Wihtgara Tribal Hidage) (in the Isle of Wight)
        - Meonwara / Meonware / Meonsæte (south-east Hampshire and Southampton, mainly on the Meon valley)
        - Ytenesæte (Jute tribe that lived in what is today's New Forest)
    - Saxons (Island Saxons)
      - East Saxons (East Secsenas) (in Essex)
        - Brahhingas (Saxon tribe centred on the settlement of Braughing in modern-day Hertfordshire)
        - Dæningas / Daenningas / Deningei / Deningel
        - Gegingas
        - Haeringas
        - Haueringas (Saxon tribe or clan that lived in today's London Borough of Havering, East End, London)
        - Hroðingas
        - Tewingas
        - Tota
        - Waeclingas
      - Middle Saxons (in Middlesex, roughly in what is today's Greater London, Hertfordshire, Surrey)
        - Bedingas (Bedfordshire)
        - Geddingas-Gillingas-Mimmas
          - Geddingas
          - Gillingas (Saxon tribe or clan that lived in today's Ealing, West End, London)
          - Mimmas
        - Gumeningas (Saxon tribe or clan that lived in today's Harrow on the Hill, West End, London)
        - Hakas (Saxon tribe that lived in Hackney, London)
        - Noxgaga / Noxga gā (gā is cognate of Gau) (Berkshire / Thames Valley Saxons)
          - Æbbingas / Aebbingas (Abingdon)
          - Braccingas (Bracknell)
          - Readingas (Reading)
          - Sunningas (Sonning)
          - Woccingas (Wokingham)
        - Padendene (Saxon tribe or clan that lived in Pæding-tun, modern-day Paddington, London)
        - Suther-ge (ge is cognate of Gau) (Surrey)
          - Ælffingas (Effingham)
          - Godhelmingas (Godalming)
          - Ohtgaga / Ohtga gā (Somewhere in Surrey)
          - Totingas (Tooting)
          - Wochingas (Woking)
      - South Saxons (South Saxons') (Sussex)
        - Haestingas (Hastings)
      - West Saxons (in Wessex)
        - Basingas (Basingstoke)
        - Eorlingas (Arlingham)
        - Glasteningas / Glestingas (Glastonbury)
        - Dornsaete / Dorsætan (Dorset)
        - Gewisse (Dorchester on Thames)
        - Hendricas (Wiltshire or Test Valley)
        - Sumortūnsǣte / Sumorsǣte / Sumorsætan (Somerset)
        - Unecunga / Unecung (they lived in Unecunga Ga – Unecunga Gau or Land, in the Upper Thames region)
        - Wilsætan (Wiltshire)
- Weser-Rhine Germani (Istvaeones)
  - Baetasii / Betasii
  - Bructeri / Bructeres / Bructuarii / Borthari? (a possible changed name of Bructeri)
  - Chamavi / Hamavi (they lived in the region today called Hamaland, in the Gelderland province of the Netherlands, between the IJssel and Ems rivers)
  - Cugerni
  - Falchovarii
  - Gamabrivii / Gambrivii
  - Incriones
  - Landoudioi / Landi
  - Sicambri / Sigambres / Sugambri
    - Marsi
    - Marsaci / Marsacii
  - Salii / Salians (before formation of the Franks) (originally they only inhabited the northern Low Rhine area, in Salland) (later, those that stayed in Salland, were conquered and assimilated by the Saxons)
  - Sunici / Sunuci
  - Tencteri (etymology of the tribe's name is Celtic)
  - Tubantes / Tuihanti
  - Ubii
  - Usipetes / Usipii / Vispi (etymology of the tribe's name is Celtic)
  - Franks / Hugones (formed by the merging of Wesser-Rhine Germanic tribes – Istvaeones tribes and by the merging and assimilation of the Chatti and related tribes) (at the time of the Migration Period and Decline of the Roman Empire, they founded the Frankish Kingdom) (those living in what is today's West Central Germany and the Low Countries, mainly Ripuarian Franks, are the ancestors of the Franconian Germans (traditionally they spoke Franconian languages) and many of the Dutch, those living in what is today's France, mainly Salian Franks, were assimilated by the Gallo-Roman majority, however their ethnonym was the origin for another ethnonym "French" of the French people)
    - Ripuarian Franks (originally Rhine river banks Franks, Eastern Austrasia Franks, Rhineland Franks in Rhineland, Hesse, Palatinate and also in Upper Franconia, that before was Thuringian)
      - Hessian Franks / Hessians
      - Lognai (late Frankish tribe that lived in Lahngau, west of Taunus Mountains)
      - Moselle Franks
      - Nistresi (Nister Franks? Diemel Franks?) (a late Frankish tribe)
      - Suduodi (late Frankish tribe)
      - Upper Franconia Franks (originally it was a Thuringian region before Frankish conquest)
      - Wedrecii (late Frankish tribe that lived in around Wetter river or Wetterau, east of the Taunus Mountains)
    - Salian Franks (originally they inhabited the northern Low Rhine area, specifically today's Salland, later they expanded in the Low Countries, and most stayed there; even later, many migrated outside Eastern Austrasia, that included Rhineland, and beyond Silva Carbonaria and the Arduenna Silva, outside the original area of Frankish settlement where Gallo-Romans were the majority, scattered throughout the territory of the Kingdom of the Franks, roughly today's France, especially the northern regions, Western Austrasia and Neustria, they were later assimilated by the Gallo-Roman majority) (later, those that stayed in Salland, were conquered and assimilated by the Saxons)
      - Low Rhine Franks (Salian Franks that stayed in the Low Rhine region of Eastern Austrasia, later known as the Low Countries, ancestors of many of the Dutch and Flemish)
      - Western Austrasian Franks (in Western Austrasia, out of the Frank majority regions)
      - Neustrian Franks (in Neustria or Neustrasia, out of the Frank majority regions)

== Germanic peoples or tribes of unknown ethnolinguistic kinship ==
Eight tribes or peoples are only mentioned by the Old Mainland Saxon wandering bard, of the Myrgingas tribe, named Widsith – Aenenes; Baningas; Deanas (they are differentiated from the Danes); Frumtingas; Herefaran; Hronas or Hronan; Mofdingas and Sycgas (not to be confused with Secgan, short name for the work in Old English called On the Resting-Places of the Saints about saints' resting places in England).

== Ancient peoples with partially Germanic background ==
Map 19: Regions of Scotland and Isle of Man settled by the Norse. Ethnogenesis of the Norse-Gaels.

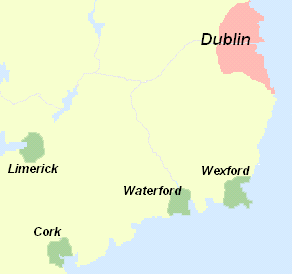
Map 20: Regions of Ireland settled by the Norse. Ethnogenesis of the Norse-Gaels.

=== Germano-Celtic ===
- Norse-Gaels (Austmenn – "Eastmen" – "People of the East", people who had come from the East – Scandinavia; Gaels of Ireland, Scotland and the Isle of Man were called Vestmenn – "Westmen" – "People of the West" – British Islands) (people of mixed Gaelic and Norse ancestry and culture that was formed in the Viking Age)
  - Norn people (Norðr – People of the North Islands)
    - Shetlanders (Hjaltar)
    - Orcadians
  - Sodor people (Hebridians-Manese Norse-Gaels) (Sodor – People of the South Islands)
    - Hebridians Norse-Gaels
      - Outer Hebridians Norse-Gaels
      - Inner Hebridians Norse-Gaels
    - Man Norse-Gaels
  - Ireland Norse-Gaels
    - Dublin Norse-Gaels
    - Wexford Norse-Gaels
    - Waterford Norse-Gaels
    - Cork Norse-Gaels
    - Limerick Norse-Gaels

=== Germano-Slavic ===
- Osterwalde (a Mainland Saxon tribe living in the same land and in close contact with the Drevani = "Wood" or "Wood Tribe", the Lipani and the Belesem or Byelozem = "White Earth" or "White Earth Tribe" Slavic tribes of the Obodrite confederacy that lived scattered in the west banks of the Elbe river, part of the Polabian Slavs or Elbe Slavs, West Slavs) (they lived in Oster Walde / Osterwalde – "Eastern Woods" in the Old Mainland Saxon view) (Osterwalde and Luneburg Heath also matched the land where the Langobards lived for a time before most of them migrated towards South) (mostly in today's Lower Saxony, in the Hanoverian Wendland, Germany)
- Rus’ people, of Kievan Rus', loose federation that was ruled by the Varangian Rurik dynasty soon assimilated by the East Slavic majority)

== Ancient peoples of uncertain origin with possible Germanic or partially Germanic background ==
=== Mixed peoples that had some Germanic component ===
==== Celtic–Germanic–Iranian ====
- Bastarnae, an ancient people who between 200 BC and 300 AD inhabited the region between the Carpathian Mountains and the river Dnieper, to the north and east of ancient Dacia – possibly they were originally a Celtic tribe later mixed with Germanic peoples and Sarmatians (a group of ancient Iranian peoples) – one possible origin of the name is from Avestan and Old Persian cognate bast- "bound, tied; slave" (cf. Ossetic bættən "bind", bast "bound") and Proto-Iranian *arna- "offspring")
  - Atmoni / Atmoli
  - Peucini / Peucini Bastarnae (a branch of the Bastarnae that lived in the region north of the Danube Delta) (Peucmi? possibly a variant of the name "Peucini")
  - Sidoni

=== Possible Germanic or non-Germanic peoples ===
==== Germanic or Slavic ====
- Vistula Veneti / Venedi (more probably a Balto-Slavic people)

==== Germanic or Celtic ====
- Anartes (more probably a Celtic tribe later assimilated by Dacians)
- Campsiani (originally Celtic, assimilated by Germani)
- Cotini / Gotini (more probably a Celtic tribe)
- Daliterni (mentioned solely by Avienius in his 6th c. Ora maritima as a tribe on the river Rhône; they have been connected to the Dala, a Rhôhne tributary flowing through Leuk, and to the better attested Veragri, a Gallic tribe located in present-day Switzerland, in the Valais canton; without naming the Daliterni, Livy refers to tribes in Valais as gentes semigermanae, i.e. half-Germanic peoples)
- Germani Cisrhenani / Tungri? (a collective name for 7 tribes) (names' etymologies of many of the tribes were Celtic; Belgic people? Chiefs anthroponyms were also Celtic)
  - Aduatuci / Atuatuci
  - Ambivaretes / Ambivareti
  - Caemani / Paemani
  - Caeraesi / Caeroesi / Caerosi
  - Condrusi
  - Eburones (later Toxandri / Texuandri?)
  - Segni
- Graioceli (more probably a Celtic tribe)
- Maeatae / Maiates / Maiatae / Maiati / Miathi (probably a Southern Pictish tribal confederation beyond and north the Antonine Wall that lived in the land between the Firth of Forth and the Firth of Tay or parts of what is now Clackmannanshire, Fife and Stirlingshire and also in the Isle of May from the 2nd century AD to the 6th and 7th centuries AD; there is also the possibility, although weaker, that they were of Norse origin)
- Nemeti / Nemetes / Nemetai (Νεμῆται) (more probably a Celtic tribe by its name Etymology, Toponyms and Theonyms)
- Nervii (more probably a Belgic tribal confederation)
- Treveri (more probably a Belgic tribe)
- Tylangii (more probably a Celtic tribe related to the Tulingi or descendant from them)

==== Germanic or Dacian ====
- Carpi / Carpiani (more probably a Dacian tribe)

==== Germanic or Iranian ====
- Taifals (possibly they were a Sarmatian Iranian people assimilated by the Goths, before the Goths settled in what is today the steppe area of Ukraine, including Crimea, in the 2nd century AD, this area was inhabited by the Sarmatians)

==== Germanic or Balto-Finnic ====
- Idumingas / Idumings (more probably a Livonian tribe, called Ydumaei by Henricus Lettus or Henricus de Lettis or Heinrich von Lettland, who wrote the Chronicon Livoniae or Livonian Chronicle of Henry)
- Kvenir / Kvænir mentioned in Egils Saga / Kvanes / Cwenas mentioned by Ohthere (more probably they were the Kainulaiset, that dwelt in Kvenland, a probable reference to Saami peoples also called Scridefinnas / Screrefennae or speakers of a related Uralic language) (over time their name became confused with the Old Norse word kván or kvæn – "woman", genitive plural kvenna, and became mistakenly confused with the legendary Amazons, a mythical all-women tribe that had relations with the Gargareans, a mythical all-men tribe)

== Mythical founders ==
Many of the authors relating ethnic names of Germanic peoples speculated concerning their origin, from the earliest writers to approximately the Renaissance. One cross-cultural approach over this more than a millennium of historical speculation was to assign an eponymous ancestor of the same name as, or reconstructed from, the name of the people. For example, Hellen was the founder of the Hellenes.

Although some Enlightenment historians continued to repeat these ancient stories as though fact, today they are recognised as manifestly mythological. There was, for example, no Franko, or Francio, ancestor of the Franks. The convergence of data from history, linguistics and archaeology have made this conclusion inevitable. A list of the mythical founders of Germanic peoples follows.

- Angul — Angles (the Kings of Mercia, according to the Anglo-Saxon Chronicle, other Anglo-Saxon dynasties are derived from other descendants of Woden)
- Ask — Istvaeones
- Aurvandil — Vandals
- Burgundus — Burgundians (Historia Brittonum)
- Dan — Danes (Chronicon Lethrense)
- Francio — Franks (Liber Historiae Francorum)
- Gothus — Goths/Geats/Gutes
- Ingve — Ingvaeones, Ynglings
- Irmin — Irminones
- Mannus — Manni, or "men", a name fragment as in the later Alemanni (Germania)
- Nór — Norwegians (Chronicon Lethrense)
- Seaxnēat — Saxons

== See also ==
- Germania
- Germanic peoples
- Norse clans
- Sippe
- Tribal Hidage
- Widsith
- Beowulf
