= Baemi =

2nd century Germanic people on north bank of Danube

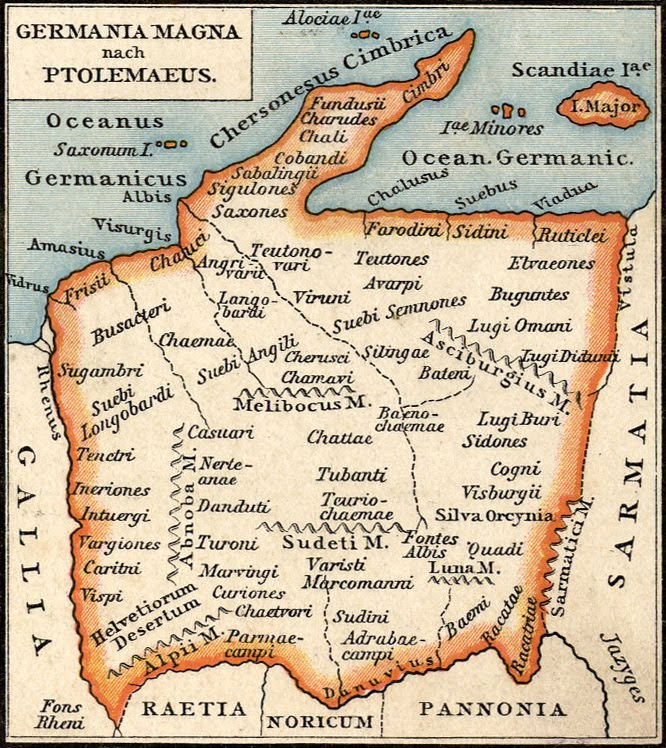
Germania Magna according to Ptolemy

The Baemi, Baiani or Baimoi (Ancient Greek: Βαῖμοι or Βαιανοί), were a Roman-era people who are only known by their mention in Ptolemy's Geography, who described them as a "large people" (μέγα ἔθνος) living on the northern side of the Middle Danube, which was at that time the boundary of the empire. They probably lived in what is now Slovakia, near the border with present day Hungary.

== Location ==
The text of Ptolemy give the following further descriptions:

- To the north of the Baimoi according to Ptolemy was "the Luna forest" and iron mines. The Quadi were still further north and the Hercynian Forest above them.
- East of them and next to them along the river were the Rakatri, and those who dwell at the river’s bends called the Racatae, both of whom are otherwise unknown from other records.
- West of them on the Danube were the Adrabaecampi, who had the Sudini north of them. Both of these are otherwise unknown, but north of them were the well-known Marcomanni to the north of whom was a forest called the Gabreta.

== Name and origins ==
Scholars see the name of this tribe as one of a group of names known from this region derived from the Celtic Boii tribe. The change from an o-sound to an a-sound, is believed to be related to the introduction of Germanic languages into the area.

Another example which is only found in Ptolemy's text, and which is sometimes considered related to it, is the people referred to as the "Bainochaimai", whose name is believed to derive from the regional name Bohemia. Early versions of the term Bohemia first appear in the first century AD, and the second part of the name is believed to be Germanic. Schütte for example, in his study of the likely confusions and errors in the text, proposed that the Baimoi and the Bainochaimai were actually the same people.

Another scholarly proposal connecting the two names, and based partly on what is known from contemporary descriptions of the politics of the area, is that the Baimoi were the people of the so called "Vannius Kingdom" which was politically part of the Quadi realm, but populated by people had been moved from Bohemia.

== See also ==
- List of Germanic peoples
