= Firaesi =

Scandinavian tribe

The Firaesi (Latinization) or Phiraisoi (original Greek) are a people listed in Ptolemy's Geography (2.10).

Ptolemy's view of the region is not very precise, but he places them on the east side of what he believed to be an island, Scandia. The presence of the Goutai, or Goths, in the center, identifies Scandia fairly certainly as the southern portion of the Scandinavian peninsula. As to whether the east of it was the east coast of Sweden or the coast of Finland opposite, the latter is perhaps too remote for detailed knowledge by Ptolemy or his sources.

There is in fact a possible Germanic derivation of Phiraisoi. They are in the same region as the Favonae, who may have been residents of Småland. Old Norse and Old Icelandic firar, Old English firas, are fairly close to Firaesi and mean "men, human beings" or Volk in German. As it happens, Uppland was traditionally divided into Folkland – four provinces, which lost their jurisdictional

Koebler's Old Norse Etymological Database in the Indo-European Etymological Database online at Leiden University gives a Proto-Indo-European root of *perkwus, becoming Germanic *ferhwioz by Grimm's Law. The root meaning is "oak", but the oak was regarded as a symbol of hardness, toughness and strength (see also Harudes).

With regard to people it means "life force" or especially "power", in the sense of the collective power of the folk. It would be a descriptive epithet of the *teuta-, "tribe, people". This connotation is probably not devoid of a military sense, as the root went into Hittite, a very early branch of Indo-European, as "army". Uppland then would have been a densely populated and at the time fairly conservative remnant of Indo-European culture. If the Indo-European penetration of Europe can be regarded as a very slow invasion, its Schwerpunkt, or "heavy point", came to rest in Uppland.

The Firaesi are not mentioned elsewhere in history, perhaps because of language changes and the preference of folk for firar. More information is undoubtedly to be gleaned from archaeology.

== See also ==
- List of Germanic tribes
