= Bateinoi =

Germanic tribe

The Bateinoi or Batini were a Germanic tribe recorded by the Roman scholar Claudius Ptolemy. According to Ptolemy they were located "above" (normally north in Ptolemy) the Banochaemae tribe, who were settled near the upper Elbe, and "below" (presumably south of) the Asciburgius mountain. That is all history knows for certain about them.

In general the area must be near the point where modern Germany, Poland and the Czech Republic meet. Based on the similarity of names in the region, it has been proposed that they lived in Bautzen in Saxony.

== See also ==
- List of Germanic peoples
