= Chaemae =

Ancient Germanic tribe cited by Ptolemy

The Chaemae were an ancient Germanic tribe cited by Ptolemy in his Geography (2.10) with the name Chaimai, which also can be written in English Khaimai.

== Nomenclature ==
All three designations probably stem from common Germanic *haimaz, "home", from Proto-Indo-European *tkei-, "settle." Where the Cham-avi reflects the ham- form (English ham-let), the other two reflect the -heim form (as in Bo-haem-ia). The monophthongization was an Ingvaeonic innovation. We are more familiar with -ham because a large part of the lowlanders moved to Britain.

The Chaemi may reflect a more ancient distribution of people calling themselves "settlers" or "natives." Why they would have done so remains obscure, but the name is of the same type as hed- (English heath), human and possibly but less certainly man.

== Ancient sources ==
Ptolemy tells us next to nothing about them, only that they were next to the Bructeri. That little turns out to be a great deal. It is often suggested that the Chaemae and the Banochaemae are alternative names for the Chamavi, based on a common derivation. We know, however, that the Chamavi and their neighbors forcibly expelled the Bructeri from their original lands, which became Hamaland after the Chamavi moved in.

== See also ==
- List of Germanic peoples
