= Germanic peoples (disambiguation) =

Germanic peoples may refer to:

- Germanic peoples, the Germanic tribes of antiquity and the early medieval times
- present-day speakers of Germanic languages

== See also ==
- List of early Germanic peoples
- Germanic-speaking Europe
