= Sitones =

Germanic people in Northern Europe mentioned by Tacitus

Map showing the Roman Empire in AD 125 and contemporary barbarian Europe, showing two possible locations of the Sitones. One, based on Tacitus, places them in central Sweden. Another view places them roughly in modern Estonia and/or Finland.

The Sitones were a Germanic people living somewhere in Northern Europe in the first century CE. They are mentioned only by Cornelius Tacitus in 97 CE in Germania. Tacitus considered them similar to Suiones (ancestors of modern Swedes) apart from one descriptor, namely that women were the ruling sex. Phonetical equivalent of ᚦ (þ/th, ð/dh) may have been documented equivalent to either /t/ or /d/, explaining sitones, suiones and suehans as local differences similar to viking age runestone carvings describing siþiuþu, suiþiuþu and suoþiauþu meaning Svitjod (Sweden).

Closely bordering on the Suiones are the tribes of the Sitones, which, resembling them in all else, differ only in being ruled by a woman. So low have they fallen, not merely from freedom, but even from slavery itself.

Speculations on the Sitones' background are numerous. According to one theory, the name is a partial misunderstanding of Sigtuna, one of the central locations in the Swedish kingdom, which much later had a Latin spelling Situne.

Another view is that the "queen" of the Sitones derives by linguistic confusion with an Old Norse word for "woman" from the name of the Kvens or Quains.

According to medievalist Kemp Malone (1925), Tacitus' characterization of both the Suiones and the Sitones is "a work of art, not a piece of historical research", with the Sitones' submission to a woman as the logical culminating degeneracy after the Suiones' total submission to their king and surrendering of their weapons to a slave.

== See also ==
- List of Germanic tribes
