= Vinoviloth =

Ancient Scandinavian tribe

The uinouiloth (underlined in red) in an early 9th-century copy of the De origine

Vinoviloth are one of the tribes in Scandza (Scandinavia) mentioned by Jordanes in De origine actibusque Getarum in the 6th century CE. In 1970, Ernesto Sestan proposed that the Vinoviloth might be the Winnili, the name used for the Lombards in their origin legend. Others have suggested that Jordanes's Vinoviloth lived in or near Vingulmark, the historical region of southeastern Norway around the Oslofjord. Other proposals locate them in Värmland, in present-day Sweden, or associate them with the Kvens farther north.

Jordanes writes:

And there are beyond these the Ostrogoths, Raumarici, Aeragnaricii, and the most gentle Finns, milder than all the inhabitants of Scandza. Like them are the Vinovilith [sic] also.

Besides De origine, the Vinoviloth are not mentioned anywhere else.

Alfred Anscombe proposes that the Vinoviloth were Goths settled in Britain at Vinovia. These would be the Goths mentioned by Asser as ancestors of Alfred the Great. The second element of their name would be related to Old English loða, cloak, which Anscombe sees as the second element in the name Lancelot. These names, in his view, have a parallel development because Lancelot can be associated with Binchester (Vinovia).

== See also ==
- List of Germanic tribes
