= Avarpi =

Historical ethnical group

The Avarpi or Auarpoi or Avarni were Germanic tribe attested in Ptolemy's Geography. The attested Greek is Auarpoi. Avarpi is a scholarly transliteration into Latin, with some using Avarni on the assumption that the name refers to the Varni of Mecklenburg. However, Ptolemy uses Farodeinoi for Varini and clearly says that the Auarpoi are next to the Teutonikai and between the Sueboi and the Farodeinoi. This location is not precise, but is somewhere in the Pommern/Propommern region.

== See also ==
- List of Germanic tribes
- Barbarian invasions
