= Helveconae =

Germanic tribe

The Helveconae, or Helvaeonae, or Helvecones, or Aelvaeones, or Ailouaiones were a Germanic tribe mentioned by Roman authors. They are possibly connected to the Hilleviones of Naturalis Historia by Pliny the Elder. The Helveconae as such (manuscript variant Helvaeonae) are one of the tribal states of the Lugii mentioned by Tacitus in Germania. The Lugii were located in the Silesia area (today Poland). Their ethnicity is speculative. Subsequent authors, such as Johann Jacob Hofmann, 1635-1706, identified the people of Tacitus with a people of Ptolemy, the Ailouaiones in Greek, which has been Latinized to Aelvaeones. Perhaps the scholars innovated Helvecones, which is not attested in classical times.

== See also ==
- List of early Germanic peoples
