= Diduni =

Germanic tribe

Asciburgius montes in yellow color

The Diduni or Dunii were a Germanic tribe mentioned only by the 2nd century geographer Claudius Ptolemy. They apparently dwelt near the Asciburgius mountains which correspond to the north central parts of Sudetes in western-southern Poland. According to Ptolemy, they were part of the larger tribal group, the Lugii. The Diduni are may be connected to the town of Lugidunum, which Ptolemy places in the same area as he places the tribe.

It is made up of the prefix 'di-', which is suggested to be analogous to the Latin suffix of 'de', meaning 'of', 'from', 'down from' or 'originating from', in addition to 'dun' and the latin suffix '-i' which would culminate to 'from the fort'.

== See also ==
- List of ancient Germanic peoples
