= Dauciones =

Ancient Germanic tribe mentioned by Ptolemy

The Daukiones (Greek) or Dauciones (Latinization) were a Germanic tribe mentioned only by the Roman scholar Claudius Ptolemy in his Geographia (2nd century AD). Ptolemy lists the Daukiones along with five or six other tribes inhabiting the "island of Scandia", which he mistakenly identified as an island off the eastern coast of the Cimbrian peninsula (Jutland), rather than the southern part of the Scandinavian peninsula. While it is generally accepted that Scandia refers to present-day southern Sweden, particularly Scania (Skåne), there is little agreement on the identification of the Daukiones.

Several scholars have offered various interpretations. Johann Kaspar Zeuss suggested that the name is a misspelling or distortion of skandiones, the inhabitants of Skåne. Gudmund Schütte suggested that the name is related to daneiones or dankiones, referring to the Danes, although the Danes do not appear in other sources before the 6th century AD. Other theories link the tribe to names such as aviones, a Scandinavian tribe mentioned by Tacitus, or dapriones, the inhabitants of Daprae—a medieval hundred in Scania. However, none of the theories has been generally accepted.

The difficulties in identifying the Daukiones stem from the fact that the name appears only in Ptolemy's text and no other historical sources mention a tribe with a similar name. Scholars have speculated that Ptolemy's naming could involve transcription errors or misinterpretations. Some researchers, like Adolf Noreen, Karl Müllenhoff and Lauritz Weibull, have suggested that the name remains too obscure to be linked with any known group, and any attempts on identification are necessarily based on pure conjecture.

== See also ==
- List of Germanic peoples

== Sources ==
- Krag, Claus; Neumann, Günter (2010) [Original publication 1984]. "Daukiones, Δαυκίωνες". In Brather, Sebastian; Heizmann, Wilhelm; Patzold, Steffen (eds.). Germanische Altertumskunde Online. Berlin, New York: De Gruyter.
