= Chali =

Germanic tribe

The Chali, the Latinized form of Khaloi or Chaloi (Χάλοι), were identified by Ptolemy in his Geography as a Germanic tribe in Jutland. Nearly all of the Germanic tribes identified by Ptolemy have left traces of their existence beyond their mention in Geography, such as through medieval traditions or place names, however, no such traces have been identified for the Chali.

== Sources ==
- Schütte, Gudmund (1915), Ptolemy's Maps of Northern Europe, A Reconstruction of the Prototypes (PDF), The Royal Danish Geographical Society

== See also ==
- List of Germanic peoples
