= Cobandi =

Germanic tribe who lived in Jutland

The Cobandi, Greek Kobandoi, were a Germanic tribe mentioned in Ptolemy's Geography (2.10), who lived in Jutland. They apparently lived between what are now Holm and Horsens.

They were probably not the same tribe as the Aviones. There has been speculation that they are related to Codanus, an ancient Roman name for the Kattegat.

== See also ==
- List of Germanic peoples
