= Caritni =

Germanic tribe in west Bavaria

The Caritni, a Latinization, or the Karitnoi in the Greek of Ptolemy's Geography (2.10), were a Germanic tribe mentioned by the Roman scholar Ptolemy generally in the region of west Bavaria. Little else is known about them.

It has been suggested that they were the tribe known as Chatti.

== See also ==
- List of Germanic peoples
