= Manimi =

Germanic tribe

The Manimi were a Germanic tribe. They were mentioned by Tacitus, in his ethnographic book Germania, where he stated that the Manimi were one of the five most powerful tribes of the Lugii. They lived between the Oder and the Vistula.

The Manimi have been compared to the "Atmonoi" mentioned by Strabo as a branch of the Basternes, and the "Lougoi Omanoi" mentioned by Claudius Ptolemy.

== See also ==
- List of Germanic peoples
