= Raetovari =

Ethnic group in Germany

The Raetovari (or Raetobari, German: Rätovarier, Latin: Raetovarii/Raetobarii) were an Alamannic tribe in the region of the Nördlinger Ries in the west of the German state of Bavaria. They lived in the upper Danube region. They were mentioned by the Roman historian Ammianus Marcellinus (330–395).
