= Fosi =

Germanic Tribe

The Germanic tribes of Central Europe in the mid-1st century.

The Fosi were a Germanic tribe. Tacitus, in his Germania mentions them as being neighbours of the Cherusci, and they suffered alongside the Cherusci in their downfall. He also noted that before their mutual downfall, the Fosi were less prosperous than the Cherusci. The two tribes, however, had been dependents in their prosperity, so they shared that same adversity on equal terms during their decline. The etymological origin of the name Fosi is not known with certainty. The name may derive from the proto-Germanic *fuhsaz, signifying "fox".
