= Burgundus =

Mythical founder of the Burgundian tribe

Burgundus was the mythical founder of the Burgundian tribe. He was named as one of the five sons of Armenon, or Irmin, in Nennius' Historia Brittonum . Irmin was the son of Mannus (Alanus in the Historia Brittonum), in myth variously a war god or the first man to dwell in Europe.
