= Casuari =

Germanic people

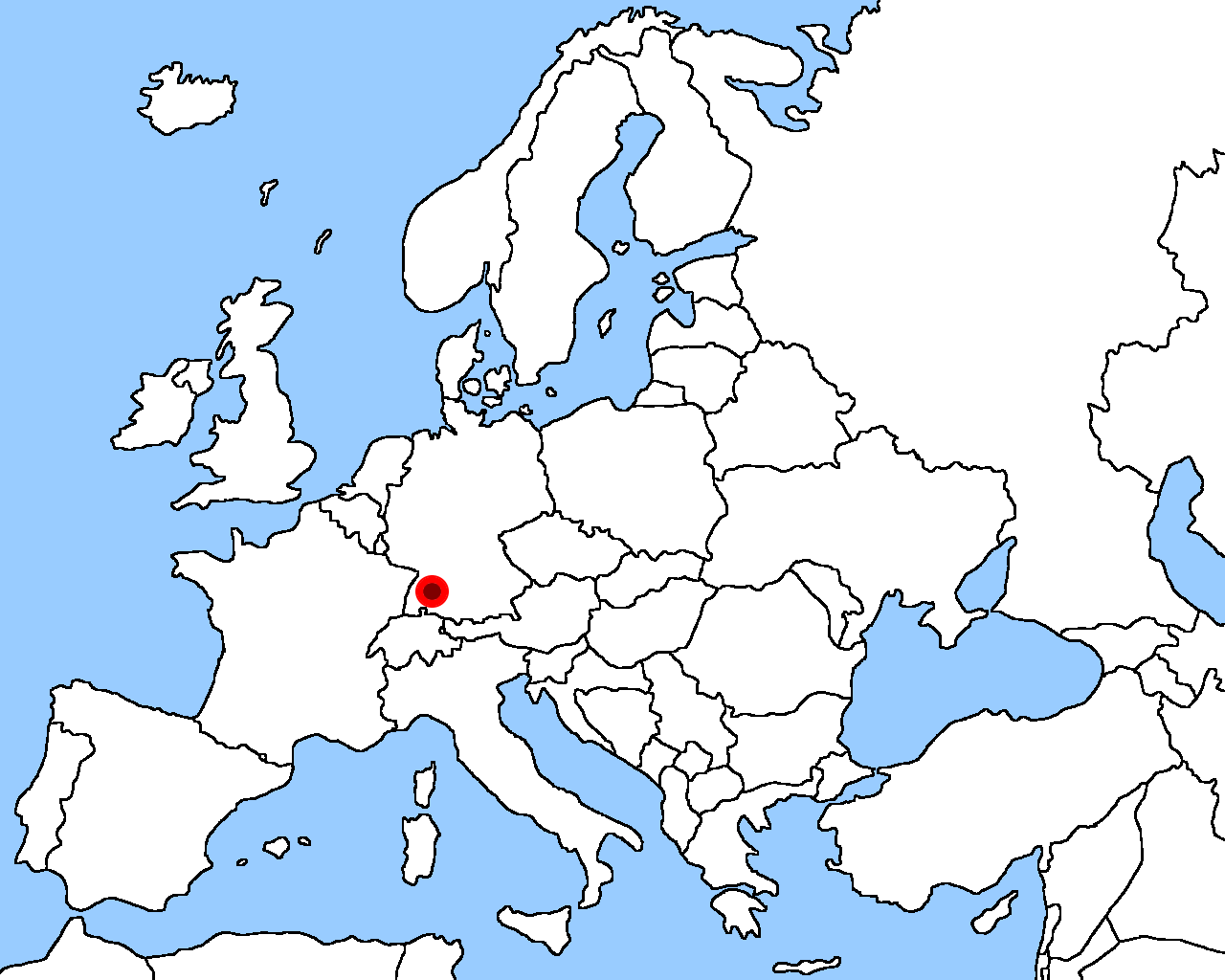
This is a map of where roughly the ancient Germanic tribe the Casuari lived as described by Ptolemy.

The Casuari were an ancient Germanic people. Ptolemy mentions them as living on the southern border of Germany, east of the Abnoba mountains, that are east of the Rhine. They were therefore neighbours of the Tencteri, a tribe living between the Rhine and the Abnoba mountains. Their origins can be traced to those of the Alemanni and Khatti. Ptolemy also mentions them as having founded the town of Suevos Casuari. The Casuari were most likely numerous during and around the time of Ptolemy, which is around 90 to 168 AD. Being a small tribe, very little remains of them, and most evidence comes from written sources.

== Language ==
The Casuari spoke a South Germanic dialect, related to the High, or Upper Germanic languages. The location of their tribe was a crossroad between the Weser–Rhine Germanic and Elbe Germanic languages. If so, their language originated from the Rhine, Alps, Elbe or the North Sea from Friesland to Jutland.

== Fall of the Western Roman Empire ==
By the time of the fall of the Western Roman Empire, the Casuari had most probably been conquered by the Romans, or had either become part of the Alemanni or another major Germanic tribe on the Rhine river.
