= Arosæte =

People of medieval England

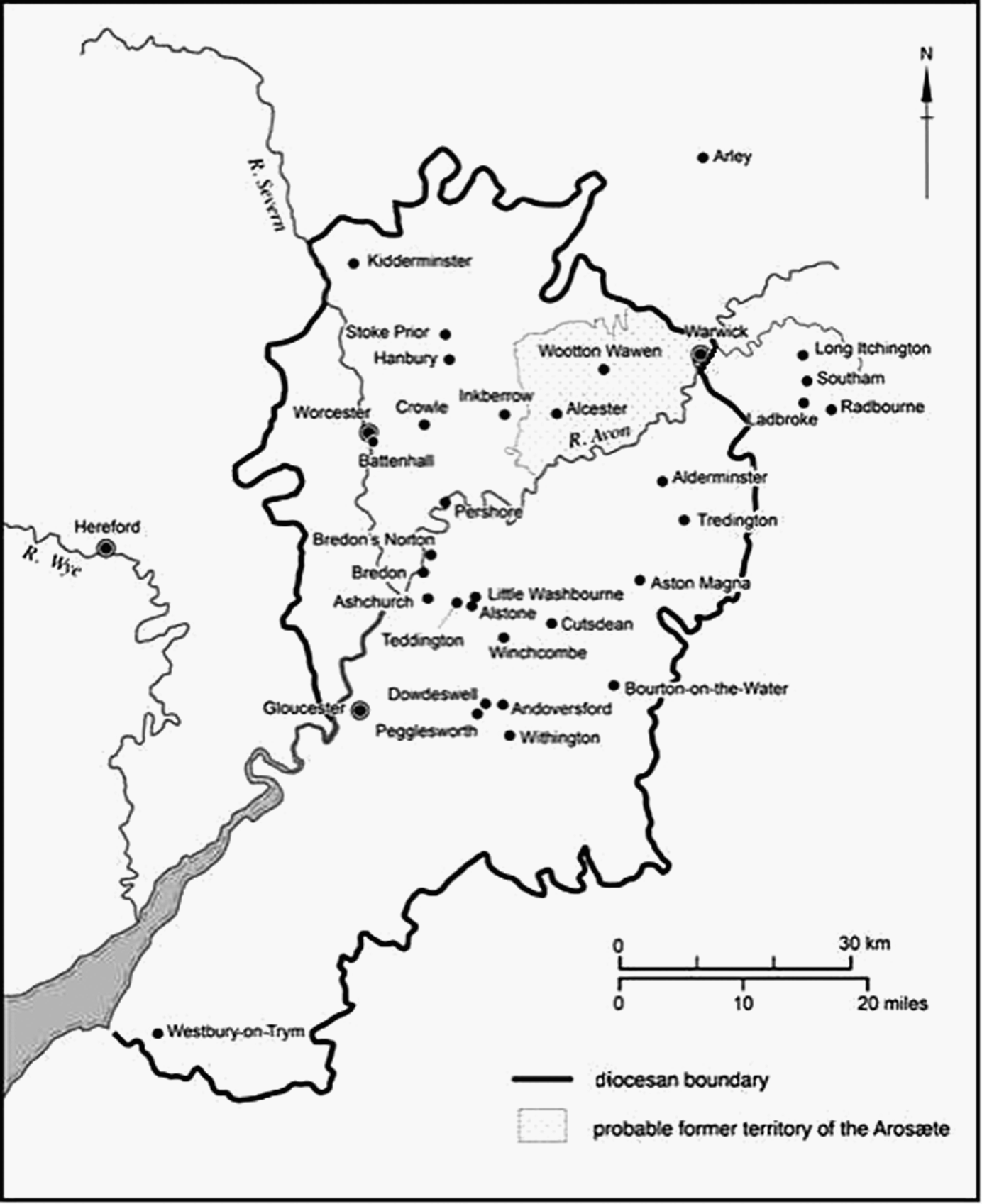
Diocese of Worcester at estimated extent in the eighth century also showing the putative area of the Arosæte.

The Arosæte were an Anglo-Saxon tribe that lived in the Kingdom of Mercia. They are mainly known to us from their inclusion in the Tribal Hidage a probable late seventh- or eighth-century Mercian tribute list, which included them at 600 hides.

According to the historian D. P. Kirby, the Arosæte territory probably followed the valleys of the two River Arrows, the Worcestershire Arrow which stretches from south Warwickshire to Worcestershire and the Herefordshire Arrow in Herefordshire and Powys.

Steven Bassett, on the other hand, place them at the lower end of the Worcestershire Arrow River, in the southwest corner of Warwickshire, centred on Alcester and near the village of Arrow. This part of Warwickshire was included in the original Diocese of Worcester - which is thought to have coincided with the Hwicce Kingdom -and roughly coincides with the Domesday Hundred of Fernecumbe.

The name is of Common Brittonic origin meaning 'to rise, surge, flow' which suggests it originally was given to the River and later transferred to the tribal group and village name.

Prior to 800, their territory was absorbed into the neighbouring larger kingdom of the Hwicce.
