= Adrabaecampi and Parmaecampi =

Historical German tribe

The Adrabaecampi (Ancient Greek: Ἀδραβαίκαμποι, romanized: Adrabaikampoi) and Parmaecampi (Παρμαίκαμποι, Parmaikampoi) were two divisions of the Kampoi (Κάμποι), a tribe of greater Germany who, according to Ptolemy, dwelled on the north bank of the Danube south of the Gabreta Forest after the Marcomanni and Sudini.

They were located, per Ptolemy, immediately north of the Danube and south of Bohemia, i.e. in the immediate vicinity of the Roman imperial border. The name Kampoi is traced back to the Celtic river name Kamp (from Celtic *cambo, "curved"). The Chamb, which flows into the Regen near Cham, and the Kamp in Lower Austria are considered tributaries of the Danube that flow on the left side. The Kambaioi, an Illyrian people, have a related name. The derivation of the names of the Kampoi tribes from Latin campi (fields) is implausible, as no good sense can be made of the prefixes adrabae and parmae. The second has been linked to Gallo-Latin parma, round shield.

The names have been treated as corruptions of Latin Altera Camba and Prima Camba, referring to two rivers or tributaries. Accordingly, the Parmaikampoi would be the people or tribal group located on the first river named Kamp and the Adrabaikampoi would be located on the second river of the name. In any case, the Adrabaikampoi cannot be located far from Kamp in Lower Austria, as they are the next people to settle south of the Gabreta Forest (Bohemian Forest).
