= Chaedini =

Germanic people

The Chaedini (Latinized form) or Chaideinoi or Khaideinoi (Greek forms) were a Germanic people that are listed only in the Geography of Ptolemy. He locates them in the west of a large island, Scandia, off the mouth of the Vistula river. Most scholars concur that Scandinavia is meant.

== Etymology ==
A strong etymology of the word is summarized in the American Heritage Dictionary under heath. Chaideinoi is identical in form to its English relative, heathen; that is, Proto-Indo-European *kaito-, "forest, uncultivated land" becomes Common Germanic *xaiþiz, appearing in *xaiþinaz, "people of the uncultivated land". The exact pronunciation of Chaidein- is not certain, but it must have been close to *xaiþin-; that is, Ptolemy's name is close to Common Germanic, even though its exact dating is unknown. It likely precedes Ptolemy, as he depended on previous sources.

Common Germanic *xaiþ- becomes Hed- in the Scandinavian languages. Possible locations of the Chaideinoi have therefore been proposed at Hedemark in Norway or, if the east of Scandia is actually Finland, in Dalarna and Gästrikland of Sweden, both of which regions contain a high concentration of Hed- names.

The descriptive nature of the name provides a clue as to why they do not appear in such strong sources as Tacitus. They must have had one or more other names, reflecting ethnic or political organization. As used, Chaideinoi would be synonymous with a possible meaning of *mannaz as "country people" (see also mannus).

== See also ==
- List of Germanic peoples
