= Bilsæte =

Anglo-Saxon English clan

The Bilsæte ("dwellers of the ridge") were a tribe or clan in Anglo-Saxon England living in an area surrounding a small ridge now occupied by the modern settlement of Bilston in the West Midlands of England.

A grant of land from King Aethelred bestowing Wolverhampton on Lady Wulfrun in 985 named the settlement as Bilsatena, and a later Anglo-Saxon charter of 996 calls the settlement Bilsetnatun. These names confirm the etymology (dwelling (tun) of the people (saetna) of the ridge (bil), and disproves the alternative and better known etymology for Bilston (Billestun).
