= Hundings =

Legendary Germanic tribe

The Hundings (Old English: Hundingas, the "hound-clan") are a legendary tribe or clan in early Germanic sources, mostly mentioned due to their feud with the Wulfings (the "wolf-clan").

== History ==
In the Poetic Edda, Hunding is a king of the Saxons, slain by Helgi Hundingsbane. The Gesta Danorum mentions a Danish king Helgo who slew Hundingus, king of Saxony, in single combat. (Note: Speaking of a Danish king named Helgo, Saxo says: "he conquered in battle Hundingus the son of Syricus, king of Saxony, at the city of Stadium 1 and challenging him to a single combat overthrew him. For this reason he was called 'the slayer of Hundingus,' deriving a glorious surname from his victory. He took Jutland from the Saxons and gave it to his generals Hesce, Eyr and Ler to hold and administer. In Saxony he decreed that the freeman and the freedman should have an equal wergeld, wishing, as it seems, to make it perfectly clear that all the families of the Teutones were equally in bondage and that the whole nation had been degraded by the loss of their freedom to an equally dishonourable condition.") The historical core of the story is likely a conflict between the Eastern Geats (the wolf-clan) and the Lombards (the hound-clan).

Hunding itself is a patronymic translating to "son of a hound", while the Hundings as a clan (sibb) would be the descendants of Hunding. Being named a "hound" or "dog" was by no means an insult in pre-Christian Germanic culture, but that the animal was rather a symbol of the warrior, while in Christian Germanic culture, it became associated with heathendom, "heathen hounds" being an appellation especially of the pagan Vikings (cf. Ulfhednar).

The name of Lamicho, king of the Lombards, may mean "little barker".

In Paulus' Historia Langobardorum, the Lombards terrorize their neighbors by spreading the word that they had dog-headed warriors, possibly a reference to ulfhednar. In Paulus's account, Lamicho is one of seven sons of a "prostitute" (meretrix), who is fostered by king Agelmund. This "prostitute" has been explained by Rudolf Much (followed by Höfler and others) as going back to a word for bitch. The Lombards' original ethnic name, Winnili, has also been connected with "savage dogs".

In Eddaic account of a feud between the Hundings and the Wulfings surrounding Helgi Hundingsbane may correspond to the Lombard story, and Malone (1926) explains the whole story of Lamicho as the Hunding version of the same feud. Jacob Grimm (1848) compared the story of Lamicho to the German legends of the origins of the Welfen, in German legend tracing their ancestry to fostered babes who were given the surname of "whelps". Hundings also appear in Sturlaugs saga starfsama, where they are a tribe of Cynocephali dwelling in Hundingjaland, which is apparently in much the same latitudes as Bjarmaland. These Hundings may relate to those Cynocephali mentioned by Adam of Bremen.

The Hundingas are mentioned in such Old English literary works as Beowulf and Widsith. Widsith mentions the Hundings twice, once in a list of Germanic clans, as ruled by Mearchalf, and a second time among outlandish tribes and peoples, in the sequence mid hæðnum ond mid hæleþum ond mid hundingum "with heathens, heroes and dog-people", implying a re-interpretation of the name as a remote people of "heathen hounds". This re-interpretation is complete in a later Anglo-Saxon manuscript on the Marvels of the East, where the Cynocephali are glossed as healf hundingas. (Note: Tiberius, f. 80r: "Eac swylce þær beoþ cende healf hundingas þa syndon hatene conopoenas. hy habbaþ horses mana & eoferes tuxas & hunda heafdu & heora oruþ byþ swylce fyreslig. þas land beoþ neah þæm burgum þe beoþ eallum world welum gefylled þis on þa suþ healfe aegiptna landes." ("And similarly there is a race of half-dogs that are called conopoenas. They have a horse's mane and a boar's tusks and a dog's head and their breath is like fire. This land is near the city which is filled with all the costly things of the world. This is in the south half of Egypt's lands.") Asa Simon Mittman, Headless men and hungry monsters, The Sarum Seminar, Stanford University Alumni Center (2003) Archived 2008-11-21 at the Wayback Machine)

== See also ==
- Tribes of Widsith
- Wulfing
- Wuffing
- Berserker
- Hundige village named after King Hunding

== Sources ==
- Harris, Joseph (2004). "Myth and Literary History: Two Germanic Examples". Oral Tradition. 19 (1): 3–19. ISSN 1542-4308.
- Otto Höfler. Cangrande von Verona und das Hundsymbol der Langobarden.
- "DER GERMANISCHE OSTEN IN DER HELDENSAGE.". Zeitschrift für deutsches Altertum und deutsche Literatur. Robarts - University of Toronto. Wiesbaden [etc.] Steiner [etc.] 1841.
- Much, Rudolf (1925). "Widsith. beiträge zu einem commentar". Zeitschrift für deutsches Altertum und deutsche Literatur. 62 (3): 113–150. ISSN 0044-2518.
- Brather, Sebastian; Heizmann, Wilhelm; Patzold, Steffen (September 24, 2010). "Germanische Altertumskunde Online". www.degruyterbrill.com (in German).
