= Gabreta Forest =

The Gabreta Forest is an ancient forest mentioned by the Greek geographers, Strabo and Ptolemy.

The name is believed to originate from the Celtic word gabro, meaning a male goat or buck.

In Strabo (Book 7, Chapter 1, Section 5) it is called a large forest hule megale Gabreta. He described how the Roman side of this forest was land of the Suebi, and beyond it lay the Hercynian Forest, which is also held by Suebi. This Hercynian forest is described by him as lying north of the Danube.

In Ptolemy (Book 2 Chapter 10), it is also called the hule Gabreta, as in Strabo. He makes it clear that this forest is north of the Danube and south of the Sudeti mountains. North of the Gabreta are the Varisti, and south of it are the Marcomanni. He says that a tributary of the Danube which arises in the Gabreta, enters from the Danube from north, somewhere east of the place where the Inn river enters from the south.

The Bohemian Forest and Bavarian Forest have both been proposed but many scholars believe these are too far to the east. It is likely that the Mühlviertel and/or Waldviertel in modern Austria are intended. The Kamp river originates in the Mühlviertel.

== Sources ==
- Reichert, Hermann (1998), "Gabreta", in Beck, Heinrich; Geuenich, Dieter; Steuer, Heiko (eds.), Reallexikon der Germanischen Altertumskunde, vol. 10 (2 ed.), De Gruyter, ISBN 978-3-11-015102-2
- Reichert, Hermann (2005), "Soudeta ore", in Beck, Heinrich; Geuenich, Dieter; Steuer, Heiko (eds.), Reallexikon der Germanischen Altertumskunde, vol. 29 (2 ed.), De Gruyter, ISBN 978-3-11-018360-3
