= Banochaemae =

Early Germanic peoples

The Baenochaemae, Bainochaimai or Baginochaimai (Ancient Greek Βαινοχαῖμαι or ) were a Germanic people recorded only in the Geography of Claudius Ptolemy, who described them as living near the Elbe.

According to Ptolemy's account, a tribe using this name lived on both sides of the river Elbe, just north of the "Melibokus" mountains, which were not the modern Melibokus, but a mountain range which Ptolemy described impossibly as both the origin of the Weser, and a mountain range through which the Elbe flowed. In older scholarship the Melibokus was identified with the Harz mountains, or Thuringian Forest or both, but it was apparently also intended to include the Ore mountains and Lusatian mountains at the north of the modern Czech Republic, on its border with modern Germany.

Scholars have long discussed the idea that this name is related to the modern term "Bohemia" in its origins, although this does not mean that this people is ancestral to the modern Bohemians, or lived in Bohemia. Rather the name Bohemia represents a combination of the more ancient tribal name of the Boii, and the Germanic word found in modern German heim, or English "home". The Boii's name is also found in other regional names over a much larger area including "Bavaria", and they had lived in parts of modern Moravia, Hungary, Lower Austria and northern Italy. (The Italian city of Bologna, Latin Bononia is named after them.)

During Roman imperial times a part of the general area of the modern Czech Republic had been settled by Suebian Germanic tribes, most notably the Marcomanni under King Marobodus. Around 100 AD Tacitus reported that in the area once inhabited by the Boii, north of the Danube, south of the Main, east of the old territory of the Helvetii, and west of the Hercynian Forest: "The name Boiemum still survives, marking the old tradition of the place, though the population has been changed."

Strabo wrote that in the south of Germany, among the hills or mountains north of the Danube (which are not yet as big as the Alps further south)...

...is the Hercynian Forest, and also the tribes of the Suevi, some of which dwell inside the forest, as, for instance, the tribes of the Coldui, in whose territory is Boihaemum, the domain of Marabodus, the place whither he caused to migrate, not only several other peoples, but in particular the Marcomanni, his fellow-tribesmen; for after his return from Rome this man, who before had been only a private citizen, was placed in charge of the affairs of state, for, as a youth he had been at Rome and had enjoyed the favor of Augustus, and on his return he took the rulership and acquired, in addition to the peoples aforementioned, the Lugii (a large tribe), the Zumi, the Butones, the Mugilones, the Sibini, and also the Semnones, a large tribe of the Suevi themselves.

Ptolemy also mentions a large people named the Baimoi (or Baemi) whose name is often considered to be another Boii/Bohemia-related name. However the Baimoi are found to the south, on the north side of the Danube before it turns south in Hungary, living near the Quadi and the Luna forest.
