= Luna forest =

Geographical feature in Ptolemy's geography book

The Luna forest (Latin: Luna silva, Greek: Louna hule) is a geographical feature in Ptolemy's Geography, whose location is not known now with certainty, but has been identified to lie near the river Morava.

According to Ptolemy, the forest was located at an unnamed northern tributary river of the Danube, downstream from the Gabreta Forest but before the southward bend leading through today's Hungary. A river flowed through the forest from the north into the Danube.

The unnamed river has been identified to be the Morava, therefore the forest has been identified with the Little Carpathians and White Carpathian Mountains, or the Manhartsberg, or Pavlov Hills (Pálava), some even having suggested that the German name of the town Břeclav, Lundenburg, is based on the name of the Luna forest.
