= Gambrivii =

Germanic tribe

The Gambrivii were a Germanic people (Latin: Germani) mentioned in passing by two authors in the first century AD. Little is known about them apart from their name.

They are first mentioned by Strabo, a Greek author, in his Geographica, written in about 23 AD, as the Γαμαβρίουιοι (Gamabríuioi). He categorized them as being in the same group of more settled Germanic peoples as the Chatti, the Chattuari and the Cherusci. This group were distinguished from the group of Germanic peoples who migrated with ease like nomads, such as the Suebi, and on the other hand from the other settled Germanic peoples who he described as living near the ocean, "the Sugambri, the Chaubi, the Bructeri, and the Cimbri, and also the Cauci, the Caülci, the Campsiani, and several others". Several of the names in this list appear in no other record.

The Gambrivii are also mentioned by Tacitus in his Germania. He lists them with the Marsi, Suebi and Vandilii as peoples who some (quidam) claimed should be added to the list of the genuine old names of Germanic peoples mentioned in old Germanic songs, who stemmed from the original descendants of the legendary Germanic ancestor named Mannus. (According to Tacitus, the old songs themselves described the original divisions of the Germani as the Ingaevones, Herminones and Istaevones.)

The Gambrivii are sometimes associated with the Sicambri (also spelled as "Sugambri"), whose name appears to contain some of the same elements.

== See also ==
- List of Germanic peoples

== Sources ==
- Max Ihm: Gambrivii. In: Paulys Realencyclopädie der classischen Altertumswissenschaft (RE). Band VII,1, Stuttgart 1910, Sp. 691.
- Günter Neumann, Dieter Timpe: Gambrivi. In: Reallexikon der Germanischen Altertumskunde (RGA). 2. Auflage. Band 10, Walter de Gruyter, Berlin / New York 1998, ISBN 3-11-015102-2, S. 406–409.
