= Ingaevonic =

Ingvaeonic may refer to:

- Ingaevones
- North Sea Germanic, also known as Ingvaeonic
