= Tuisto =

Divine ancestor of the Germanic peoples

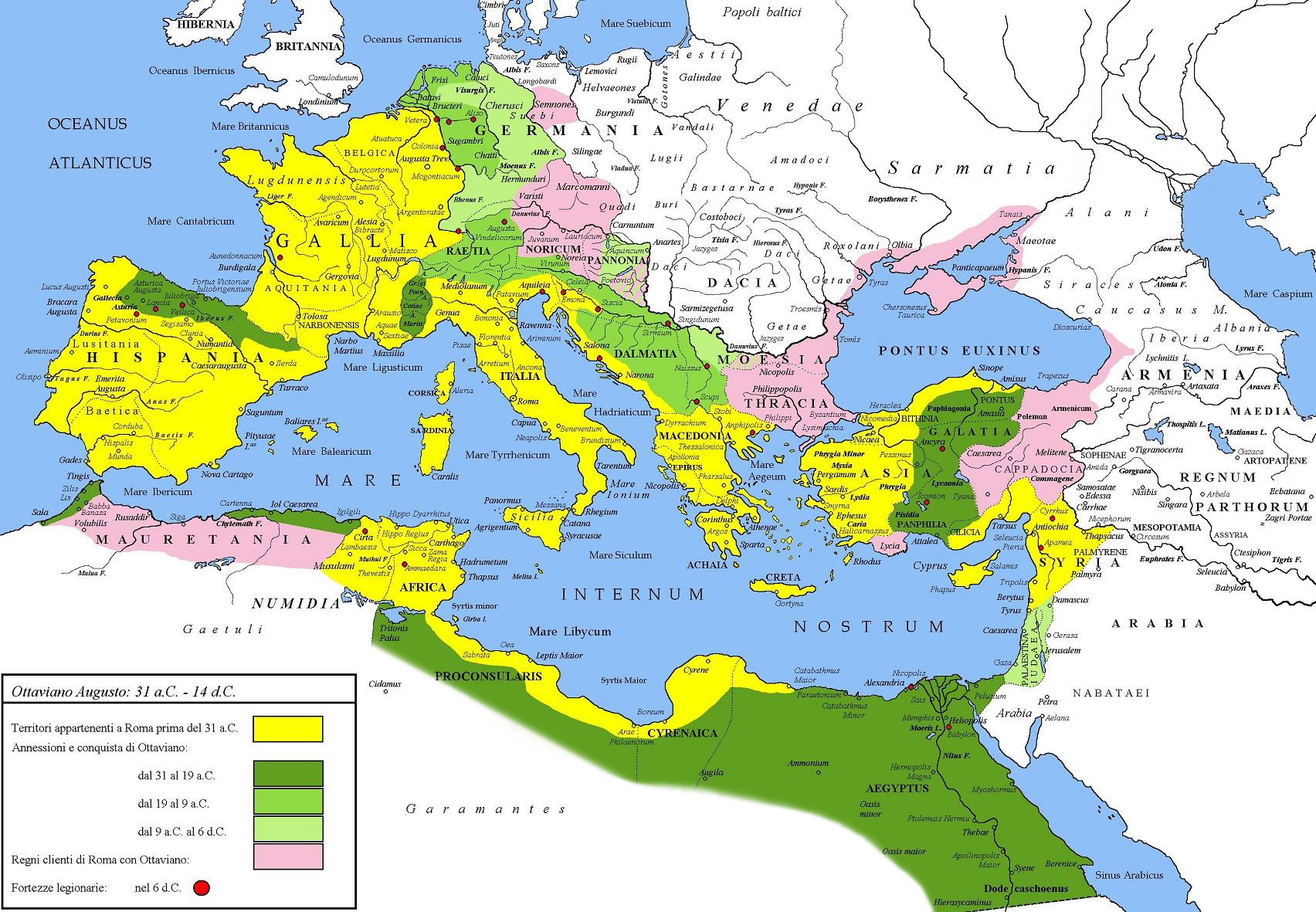
Map showing the approximate locations of the major Germanic tribes in and around the geographical region of Germania as mentioned in Tacitus' work, the Germania

According to Tacitus's Germania (AD 98), Tuisto (or Tuisco) is the legendary divine ancestor of the Germanic peoples. The figure remains the subject of some scholarly discussion, largely focused upon etymological connections and comparisons to figures in later (particularly Norse) Germanic mythology.

== Etymology ==
The Germania manuscript corpus contains two primary variant readings of the name. The most frequently occurring, Tuisto, is commonly connected to the Proto-Germanic root *twai – "two" and its derivative *twis – "twice" or "doubled", thus giving Tuisto the core meaning "double". Any assumption of a gender inference is entirely conjectural, as the tvia / tvis roots are also the roots of any number of other concepts / words in the Germanic languages. Take for instance the Germanic "twist", which, in all but the English has the primary meaning of "dispute / conflict". (Note: Claims of a connection between Tuisto and Teut and/or Teutones, or worse, the former and the Buddhist name Tat as proposed by Hargrave Jennings in his Indian Religions (1890; republished in 1996) are to be rejected as grand examples of pseudoscientific language comparison. Though rejected outright in scholarly journals even before full publication, Faber's ideas apparently gained a wide circulation. Cf. Valpy (1812):227.)

The second variant of the name, occurring originally in manuscript E, reads Tuisco. One proposed etymology for this variant reconstructs a Proto-Germanic *tiwisko and connects this with Proto-Germanic *Tiwaz, giving the meaning "son of Tiu". This interpretation would thus make Tuisco the son of the sky-god (Proto-Indo-European *Dyeus) and the earth-goddess.

=== Tuisto, Tvastar, and Ymir ===
Connections have been proposed between the 1st-century figure of Tuisto and the primeval being Ymir in later Norse mythology, attested in 13th-century sources, based upon etymological and functional similarity. (Note: Simek (1995:485) further connects Ymir to PIE *iemo- "twin" or "double", whence Sanskrit Yama, Italic Gemini. See also Jumis, Remus.) Meyer (1907) sees the connection as so strong, that he considers the two to be identical. Lindow (2001), while mindful of the possible semantic connection between Tuisto and Ymir, notes an essential functional difference: while Ymir is portrayed as an "essentially ... negative figure" – Tuisto is described as being "celebrated" (celebrant) by the early Germanic peoples in song, with Tacitus reporting nothing negative about Tuisto.

Jacob (2005) attempts to establish a genealogical relationship between Tuisto and Ymir based on etymology and a comparison with Vedic Indian mythology: as Tvastr, through his daughter Saranyū and her husband Vivaswān, is said to have been the grandfather of the twins Yama and Yami, so Jacob argues that the Germanic Tuisto (assuming a connection with Tvastr) must originally have been the grandfather of Ymir (cognate to Yama). Incidentally, Indian mythology also places Manu (cognate to Germanic Mannus), the Vedic progenitor of mankind, as a son of Vivaswān, thus making him the brother of Yama/Ymir.

== Attestation ==
Tacitus relates that "ancient songs" (Latin carminibus antiquis) of the Germanic peoples celebrated Tuisto as "a god, born of the earth" (deum terra editum). These songs further attributed to him a son, Mannus, who in turn had three sons, the offspring of whom were referred to as Ingaevones, Herminones and Istaevones, living near the Ocean (proximi Oceano), in the interior (medii), and the remaining parts (ceteri) of the geographical region of Germania, respectively.

== Theories and interpretations ==
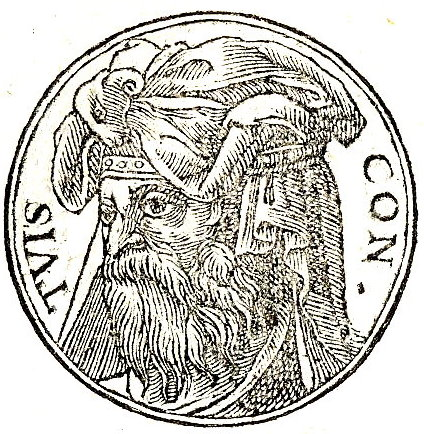
Tuisco from Promptuarii Iconum Insigniorum. The book identifies him as Ashkenaz, son of Gomer.

Tacitus's report falls squarely within the ethnographic tradition of the classical world, which often fused anthropogony, ethnogony, and theogony together into a synthetic whole. The succession of father-son-three sons parallels occurs in both Germanic and non-Germanic Indo-European areas. The essential characteristics of the myth have been theorized as ultimately originating in Proto-Indo-European society around 2,000 BCE.

According to Rives (1999), the fact that the ancient Germanic peoples claimed descent from an earth-born god was used by Tacitus to support his contention that they were an indigenous population: the Latin word indigena was often used in the same sense as the Greek autochthonos, meaning literally '[born from] the land itself'. Lindauer (1975) notes that although this claim is to be judged as one made out of simple ignorance of the facts on the part of Tacitus, he was somewhat correct, as he made the judgement based on a comparison with the relatively turbulent Mediterranean region of his day.

The name Tuisto is also given as Tuitsch or Teutsch in its alternative versions and made to derive from the same founding figure called Tuisco (merely as alternate spellings of the same name) who was claimed to have led the Germans from the incident of the Tower of Babel into Europe and from whom the Germans themselves derived their name: Deutsch and as a consequence that of their land.

== Later influence ==
In 1498, a monk named Annio da Viterbo published fragments known as "Pseudo-Berossus", now considered a forgery, claiming that Babylonian records had shown that Tuiscon or Tuisto, the fourth son of Noah, had been the first ruler of Scythia and Germany following the dispersion of peoples, with him being succeeded by his son Mannus as the second king. Later historians (e.g. Johannes Aventinus) managed to furnish numerous further details, such as the assertion by James Anderson that this Tuiscon was in fact none other than the biblical Ashkenaz, son of Gomer.

== See also ==
- Ethnogenesis
- Tvashtar
- Loki

== Bibliography ==
- Bonfiglio, Thomas Paul (2010). Mother Tongues and Nations: The Invention of the Native Speaker. De Gruyter. ISBN 9781934078266.
- Grimm, J.; trans. Stallybrass, James Steven. (2004a). Teutonic Mythology, Vol. I. Dover Publications. ISBN 0-486-43546-6.
- Grimm, J.; trans. Stallybrass, James Steven. (2004b). Teutonic Mythology, Vol. IV. Dover Publications. ISBN 0-486-43549-0.
- Jacob, Alexander (2005). Ātman: A Reconstruction of the Solar Cosmology of the Indo-Europeans. Georg Olms. ISBN 3-487-12854-3.
- Lindauer, Josef (1975). Germania: Bericht über Germanien. Munich: Deutscher Taschenbuch. ISBN 3-423-09101-0.
- Lindow, John. (2001) Norse Mythology: A Guide to the Gods, Heroes, Rituals, and Beliefs. Oxford University Press.
- North, Richard (1997). Heathen Gods in Old English Literature. Cambridge University Press. ISBN 0-521-55183-8.
- Parry, Graham (1996). The Trophies of Time: English Antiquarians of the Seventeenth Century. Oxford University Press. ISBN 9780191567155.
- Rawlinson, George (2000). The History of Herodotus.
- Simek, Rudolf (1995). Lexikon der germanischen Mythologie. Stuttgart: Kröner ISBN 3-520-36802-1.
- Simek, Rudolf (2007), trans. Hall, Angela Dictionary of Northern Mythology. D. S. Brewer. ISBN 0-85991-513-1.
- Stuart, Duane R. (1916). Germania. New York: MacMillan Co. 1916.
- Tacitus; trans. Rives, J. B. (1999) Germania. Oxford University Press. ISBN 0-19-815050-4.
- Tacitus; trans. Fuhrmann, Manfred (2000). De origine et situ Germanorum liber. Stuttgart: Reclam. ISBN 3-15-009391-0.
- Valpy, A. J. (March–June 1812). The Classical Journal, Vol. V. London: A. J. Valpy.
- White, Craig M. (2007). The Great German Nation: Origins and Destiny. AuthorHouse. ISBN 9781434325495.
- Kraus, Andreas (2012). Studien zur bayerischen Landesgeschitsschreibung in Mittelalter und Neuzeit (in German). Beck. ISBN 9783406107245..
