= Istvaeones =

Historical ethnic group

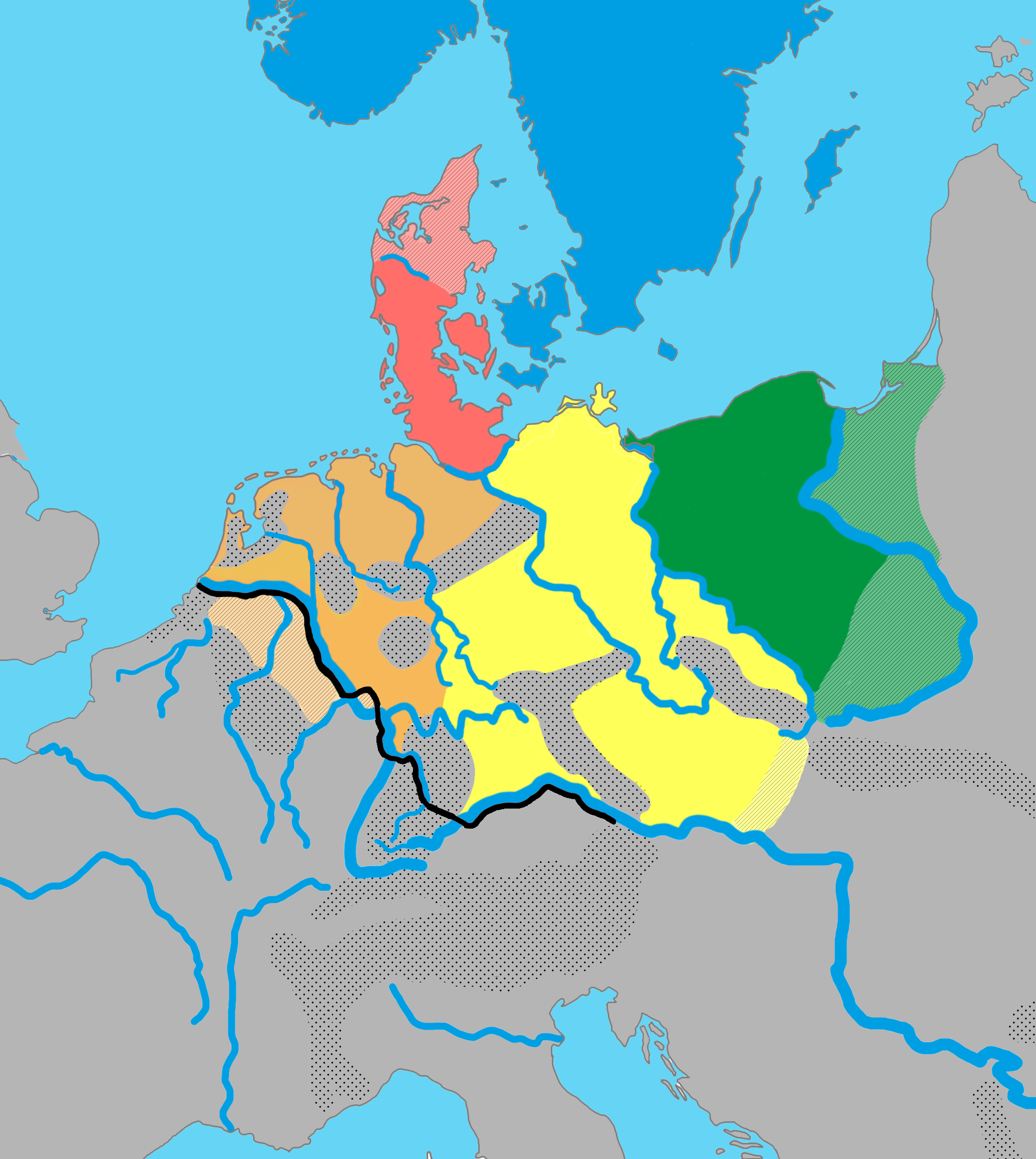
A proposed distribution of the primary Germanic dialect groups in Europe in around AD 1. The depiction of Jutland as a West Germanic area is typical within German scientific tradition. North Germanic North Sea Germanic (Ingvaeonic) Weser–Rhine Germanic (Istvaeonic) Elbe Germanic (Irminonic) East Germanic

The Istvaeones, Istaevones or Istiaeones, whose name may originally have been Istriones, were a group of Germanic peoples who lived near the Rhine border of the Roman Empire in the 1st century AD, and who were understood on the basis of old Germanic "songs" (Latin: carmina) to descend from an ancient common ancestor. According to Tacitus the old songs described three such groups, each descended from one of the three sons of their common ancestor who was named Mannus, and who was in turn the son of a god named Tuisco. The other two groups were the Ingaevones who lived on the North Sea coast, and the Herminones who lived further inland. Apart from this Mannus story, Tacitus noted there were claims that this god had more offspring, and that there were other tribal names as old as these three. In an earlier mention of these three peoples by Pliny the Elder it is explained that the Istvaeones lived near the Rhine. The surviving manuscripts of both Pliny and Tacitus lack any listing of specific Germanic peoples who were Istvaeones.

Although the names of these three peoples did not appear again in Roman era literature, they were used again in learned medieval literature, although different nations were included in the medieval versions. The terms were also revived in modern times in both archaeology and linguistics, in proposals about the evolution of the languages and cultures of the Germanic peoples. The use of these terms in linguistics and archaeology is especially associated with the interdisciplinary proposals of Friedrich Maurer (1898–1984).

In archaeology, the term Istvaeonic has sometimes been associated with the so called Rhine-Weser material culture which came into being during the Roman era, replacing earlier La Tène material cultures. The material culture of the region became distinct after the Romans first entered the region. In linguistics, the term "Istvaeonic languages" is sometimes given for a proposed sub-grouping within the West Germanic language family, consisting of a proposed Frankish language and its descendants, which would include Old Dutch and several historical dialects of German. The language of the ancestral Istvaeones may have been Celtic, but Maurer proposed that their language indirectly influenced later Germanic languages in the area as a substrate.

== Classical sources ==
The Istvaeones were first mentioned in the first century AD by Pliny the Elder (c.23–79 AD), and later by Tacitus (c.56–120 AD), who used the spelling "Istaeuones". In English translations, Pliny's older spelling is represented in different ways reflecting a wide range of spellings in manuscripts. The Latin edition by Karl Mayhoff chose the spelling "Istuaeones", but Mayhoff noted many variants. John Bostock's translation uses the variant "Istaeuones" (like Tacitus), and the later translation by Harris Rackham in the Loeb Classical Library uses the variant "Istiaeones". Other variants include an "r", such as "Istriones". More recently, Günter Neumann has argued that the Pliny spelling variants should be reconstructed as Istriones and proposed a reconstructed Germanic form of *Istr-ijaniz. He proposes that the first component in the name was not originally Germanic, and notes that there have been many speculations about its meaning, but most have been worthless.

Pliny specified that the Istvaeones lived near the Rhine, but he didn't mention the Mannus ancestry narrative which Tacitus reported. Also, unlike Tacitus, he reported five races (genera) of the Germanic peoples instead of three, because he included two extra groups who lived much further to the east, the Vandili, and the Bastarnae. Concerning the Inguaeones, he mentioned that these included the Cimbri, the Teutoni, and the tribes of the Chauci. The "Hermiones", on the other hand, dwelled inland, and included the Suevi, Hermunduri, Chatti, and Cherusci. When it comes to the Istvaeones however there is a problem in the manuscripts, which means no listing of peoples can be confidently reconstructed. Some of the manuscripts wrongly repeat the Cimbri, Teutoni and Chauci, or just the Cimbri. It has been suggested that the Sicambri were originally mentioned here.

Tacitus gave no information about specific tribes of the Istvaeones, or about where they lived. He agreed with Pliny that the "Ingaevones" lived near the ocean, and the "Herminones" lived inland, but the Istvaeones were simply described as the rest of the Mannus-descended peoples apart from these (ceteri Istaevones vocentur). More importantly he added that the Germanic peoples had ancient songs (carmina), which was their only way of remembering or recording the past. It is in these songs that the Germani celebrate a god, Tuisto, and his son Mannus, as the origin of their race (gens). The Ingaevones, Herminones, and Istvaeones descended from his three sons. He also noted that there were people who claimed that the god had more offspring. For example, he noted that there were claims that the names of the Marsi, Gambrivii, and Suevi, as well as the Vandili previously mentioned by Pliny, were genuine "old names" (vera et antiqua nomina), like the Ingaevones, Herminones, and Istvaeones. He also noted that the application of the term Germani to all these Germanic peoples collectively was a recent innovation, both among the Germanic peoples themselves, and others.

== Medieval interpretations ==
In late Roman times it appears that a scholarly effort was made to rework the Mannus myth, with an updated list of peoples, which also included the non-Germanic Romans and Britons. These are included among the descendants of "Istio" along with the Germanic peoples of the Rhineland of late Roman times, the Franks and Alemanni. A version of this list has survived in the Historia Brittonum (written c.830). Walter Goffart published the following reconstruction.

Tres fuerunt fratres, primus Erminus, secundus Inguo, tertius Istio. Inde adcreuerunt gentes XIII. Primus Erminus genuit Gothos, Walagothos, Wandalos, Gepedeos, et Saxones. Inguo genuit Burgundiones, Turingos, Langobardos, Baioarios. Istio genuit Romanes, Brittones, Francos, Alamannos.

There were three brothers, first Erminus, second Inguo, third Istio. From them derive thirteen peoples. First Erminus brought forth the Goths, Foreign Goths, Vandals, Gepides and Saxons. Inguo brought forth the Burgundians, Thuringians, Lombards, Bavarians. Istio brought forth the Romans, British [or Bretons], Franks, Alamans.

Variant spellings of the name Istio include Estio, Escio, Hostius, Ostius, Hisisio, Hissitio, Hisitio, Hessitio and Scius.

== Modern interpretations ==
The historical sources give no complete account of the Istvaeones. Modern historians attempt to extrapolate their tribal constituents based on later sources, archeological findings and linguistic information.

For example, Tacitus and other Roman authors named various tribes originally living near the Rhine such as the Frisii, Ubii, Vangiones, Triboci, and Nemetes. Much later the peoples of these regions came to be seen as either Roman, Frankish or Allemanic.

== The Istvaeones as a linguistic grouping ==
Now controversial, the German linguist Friedrich Maurer, in his book "Nordgermanen und Alemannen", connected the apparently pre-Roman group-sentiment of the Istvaeones to his proposed "Weser-Rhine Germanic" proto-language, or dialectal grouping, which he proposed to have existed during the Roman era. Under this scheme the concept of a single West Germanic proto language is rejected and Weser-Rhine Germanic is the ancestor of Frankish dialects, including both Old Dutch and dialects of West Central German. This means that they would have a different ancestral language to other types of German, such as Bavarian and Alemannic, although all these dialects have been in the same West Germanic dialect continuum since their first attestations.

The term Istvaeonic was used in this case because the proposal was not argued purely on the basis of linguistic evidence, nor purely about the immediate precursors of the medieval West Germanic languages, but instead involved interdisciplinary evidence, asserting a long period of continuity, connecting the pre-Roman Istvaeones mentioned by Pliny and Tacitus, with Roman era archaeological evidence, and medieval languages. Throughout all these periods, according to the proposal, the peoples of this cultural group would have been linguistically and culturally distinguishable from the Elbe Germanic peoples who were their neighbours.

== The Istvaeones as an archeological culture ==
Finds assigned to the Istvaeones are characterized by a greater heterogeneity than can be found in the other Germanic archaeological groupings. Their predominant burial type is the pyre grave. There are no richly equipped princely graves or weapons as grave goods to be found as, for example, occur with the neighboring Elbe Germanic groups. Scholars have speculated about whether weapons were used as "immaterial" grave goods instead. In other words, weapons made of metal were placed on the pyre of a warrior, for example, but only his ashes were buried in the pyre grave. This is, however, a controversial thesis. Weapons as grave goods first appear in northern Gaul, i.e. on the Roman side of the Rhine, in burial graves, and are not found to the east of the Rhine until the Merovingian period.

== Bibliography ==
Modern scholarship

- Beck, Heinrich (2003), "Rhein-Weser-Germanen § 1. Sprachgeschichtliches", in Beck, Heinrich; Geuenich, Dieter; Steuer, Heiko (eds.), Reallexikon der Germanischen Altertumskunde, vol. 24, De Gruyter, pp. 532–533, doi:10.1515/9783110906141, ISBN 3-11-017163-5
- Goffart, Walter (1983). "The Supposedly 'Frankish' Table of Nations: An Edition and Study". Frühmittelalterliche Studien (Reprinted in Rome's Fall and After (Hambledon, 1989), pp. 133–166). 17 (1): 98–130. doi:10.1515/9783110242164.98. S2CID 201734002.
- James, Edward (1988). The Franks. The Peoples of Europe. Oxford, UK; Cambridge, Massachusetts: Basil Blackwell. ISBN 0-631-17936-4.
- Friedrich Maurer (1942) Nordgermanen und Alemannen: Studien zur germanische und frühdeutschen Sprachgeschichte, Stammes- und Volkskunde, Strasbourg: Hünenburg.
- Neumann, Günter (2000), "Istwäonen", in Beck, Heinrich; Geuenich, Dieter; Steuer, Heiko (eds.), Reallexikon der Germanischen Altertumskunde, vol. 15 (2 ed.), De Gruyter, ISBN 978-3-11-016649-1
- Wadden, Patrick (2016). "The Frankish Table of Nations in Insular Historiography". Cambrian Medieval Celtic Studies. 72: 1–31.

Older sources

- Gregory of Tours (1997) [1916]. Halsall, Paul (ed.). History of the Franks: Books I–X (Extended Selections). Translated by Ernst Brehaut. Columbia University Press; Fordham University.
- Grimm, Jacob (1835). Deutsche Mythologie (German Mythology); From English released version Grimm's Teutonic Mythology (1888); Available online by Northvegr © 2004-2007:Chapter 15, page 2-; 3. File retrieved 11-18-2015.
- Tacitus, Germania (1st Century AD). (in Latin)

== See also ==
- List of Germanic peoples
