= Ingaevones =

West Germanic people of classical antiquity

The Ingaevones (Latin: [ɪŋɡae̯ˈwoːneːs]) or Ingvaeones (English: /ˌɪŋviːˈɒnɪz/) were a Germanic cultural group living in the Northern Germania along the North Sea coast in the areas of Jutland, Holstein, and Lower Saxony in classical antiquity. Tribes in this area included the Angles, Chauci, Saxons, and Jutes.

The name is transmitted in two different forms in ancient sources: Tacitus provides the form Ingaeuones, while Pliny the Elder has Inguaeones. Most scholars derive the name from the god or hero attested under the name Yngvi in later Norse sources, and thus believe Pliny's form is the original one. Hence the postulated common group of closely related dialects of the "Ingvaeones" is called Ingvaeonic or North Sea Germanic.

Pliny ca AD 80 in his Natural History (IV.28) lists the Ingaevones as one of the five Germanic races, the others being the Vandili, the Istvaeones, the Hermiones and the Bastarnae. According to him, the Ingaevones were made up of Cimbri, Teutons and Chauci.

Similarly, Tacitus' source categorized the Ingaevones near the ocean as one of the three tribal groups descended from the three sons of Mannus, son of Tuisto, progenitor of all the Germanic peoples, the other two being the Irminones and the Istaevones. According to the speculations of Rafael von Uslar, this threefold subdivision of the West Germanic tribes corresponds to archeological evidence from late antiquity.

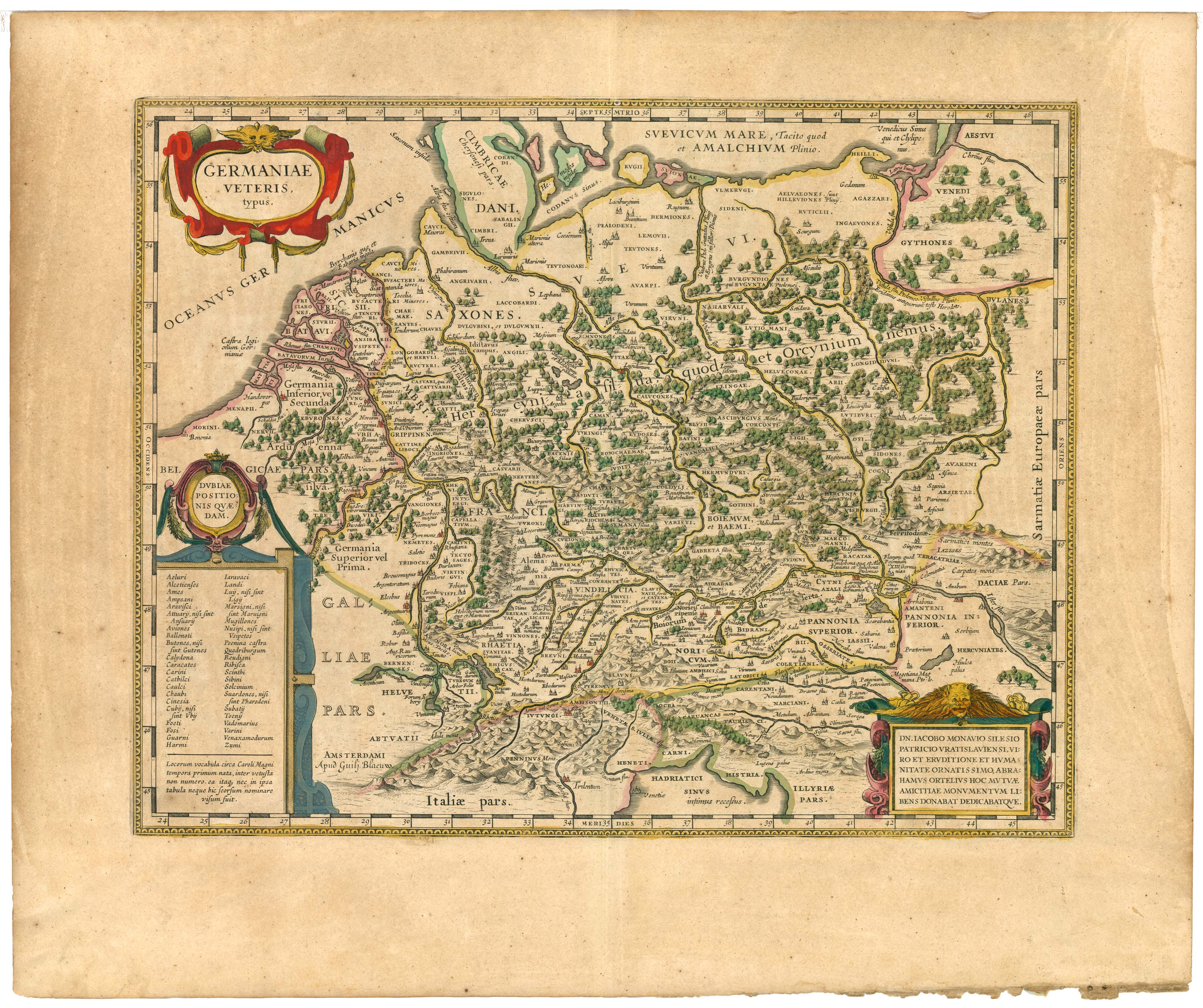
Germaniae veteris typus ("Image of Old Germany"), edited by Willem and Joan Blaeu, 1645. Aestui, Venedi, Gythones and Ingaevones are labeled in the right upper portion of the map.

Ing, the legendary father of the Ingaevones/Ingvaeones derives his name from a posited proto-Germanic *Ingwaz, as Ing, Ingo or Inguio, son of Mannus. This is also the name applied to the Viking Age deity Freyr, known in Sweden as Yngvi-Freyr and mentioned as Yngvi-Freyr in Snorri Sturluson's Ynglinga saga. Jacob Grimm, in his Teutonic Mythology considers this Ing to have been originally identical to the obscure Scandinavian Yngvi, eponymous ancestor of the Swedish royal house of the Ynglinga, the "Inglings" or sons of Ing. Ing appears in the set of verses composed about the 9th century and printed under the title The Old English Rune Poem by George Hickes in 1705:

Ing wæs ærest mid Est-Denum
Gesewen secgum, oþ he siððan est
Ofer wæg gewat; wæn æfter ran;
Þus heardingas þone hæle nemdun.

An Ingui is also listed in the Anglo-Saxon royal house of Bernicia and was probably once seen as the progenitor of all Anglian kings. Since the Ingaevones form the bulk of the Anglo-Saxon settlement in Britain, they were speculated by Noah Webster to have given England its name, and Grigsby remarks that on the continent "they formed part of the confederacy known as the 'friends of Ing' and in the new lands they migrated to in the 5th and 6th centuries. In time, they would name these lands Angle-land, and it is tempting to speculate that the word Angle was derived from, or thought of as a pun on, the name of Ing."

According to the Trojan genealogy in the Historia Brittonum, Mannus becomes Alanus and Ing, his son, becomes Neugio. The three sons of Neugio are named Boguarus, Vandalus and Saxo—from whom came the peoples of the Boguarii (Baiuvarii), the Vandals, the Saxons and Taringi (Thuringii). This account comes to the Historia by way of the 6th-century Frankish Table of Nations, which borrows directly from Tacitus.

== See also ==
- List of Germanic peoples
- Anglo-Saxons
