= Mannus =

Germanic mythological figure

Mannus, according to the Roman writer Tacitus, was a figure in the creation myths of the Germanic tribes. Tacitus is the only source of these myths.

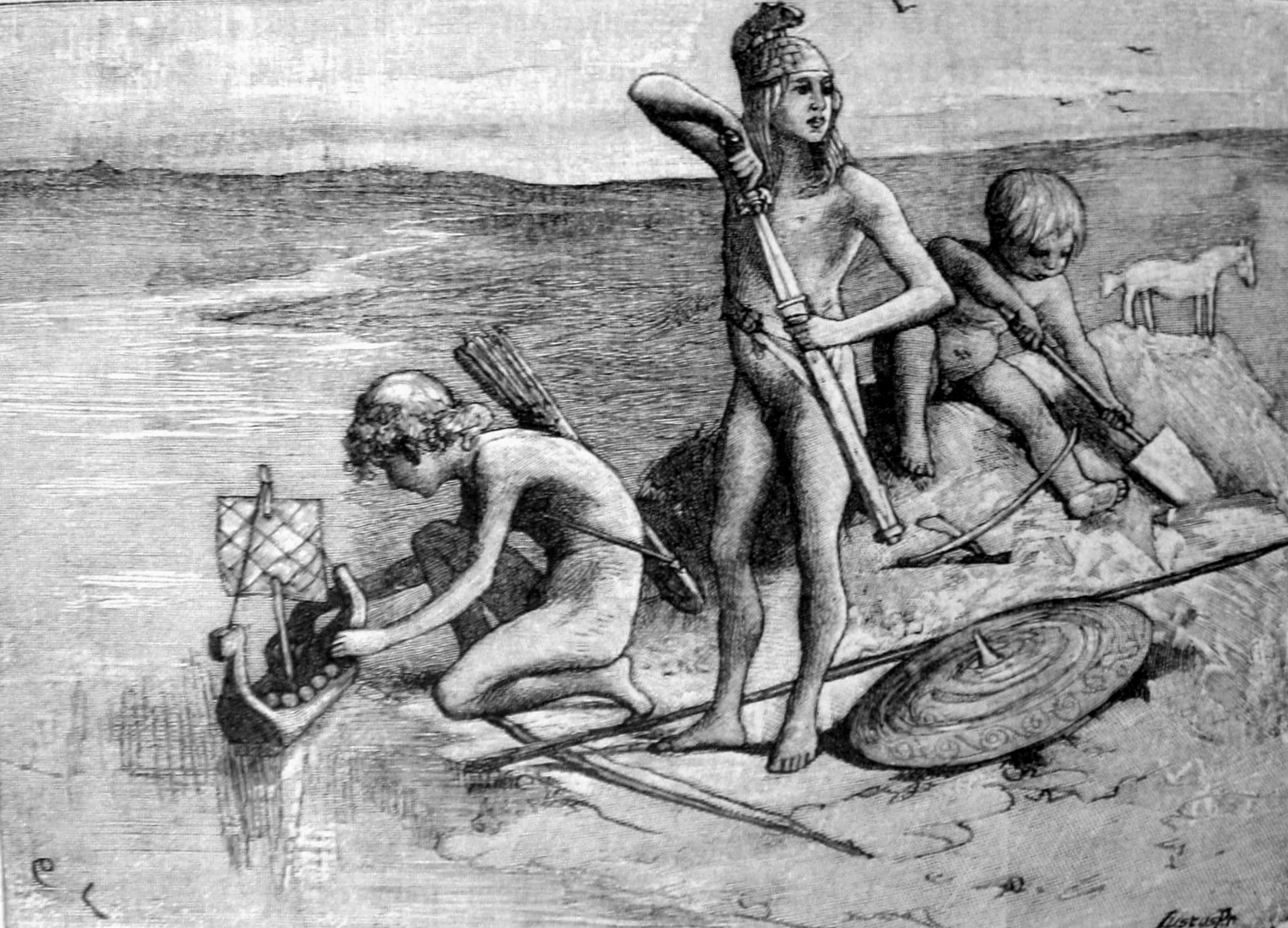
Engraving of the three sons of Mannus (Carl Larsson, 1893): Ingui plays with a model ship (the Ingaevones lived by the sea); Irmin wears a helmet and sword (the Irminones were famed as warriors); Istaev/Iscio digs in the earth and has a toy horse (the Istvaeones were horsemen and farmers).

Tacitus wrote that Mannus was the son of Tuisto and the progenitor of the three Germanic tribes Ingaevones, Herminones and Istvaeones. In discussing the German tribes, Tacitus wrote:

In ancient lays, their only type of historical tradition, they celebrate Tuisto, a god brought forth from the earth. They attribute to him a son, Mannus, the source and founder of their people, and to Mannus three sons, from whose names those nearest the ocean are called Ingvaeones, those in the middle Herminones, and the rest Istvaeones. Some people, inasmuch as antiquity gives free rein to speculation, maintain that there were more sons born from the god and hence more tribal designations—Marsi, Gambrivii, Suebi, and Vandilii—and that those names are genuine and ancient.

Several authors consider the name Mannus in Tacitus's work to stem from an Indo-European root.

The Latinized name Mannus is evidently a cognate of Proto-Germanic *mannaz, 'man'.

Mannus again became popular in literature in the 16th century, after works published by Annius de Viterbo and Johannes Aventinus purported to list him as a primeval king over Germany and Sarmatia.

In the 19th century, F. Nork wrote that the names of the three sons of Mannus can be extrapolated as Ingui, Irmin, and Istaev or Iscio. A few scholars like Ralph T. H. Griffith have expressed a connection between Mannus and the names of other ancient founder-kings, such as Minos of Greek mythology, and Manu of Hindu tradition.

Guido von List incorporated the myth of Mannus and his sons into his occult practice, which were later adopted into Nazi occult beliefs.

== See also ==
- Manu (Hinduism) 'Man', with several theological meanings
- Manu and Yemo – reconstructed Proto-Indo-European creation-myth figures
- Man (word)
- Ask and Embla - the first humans in Norse mythology
- Mannaz – 'man', name of the /m/ rune in the Elder Futhark
- Tvashtr – Vedic artisan god (cognate with Tuisto)
- Frankish Table of Nations - Mannus's sons are mentioned
