= Suebi =

Historical ethnic grouping of Germanic tribes

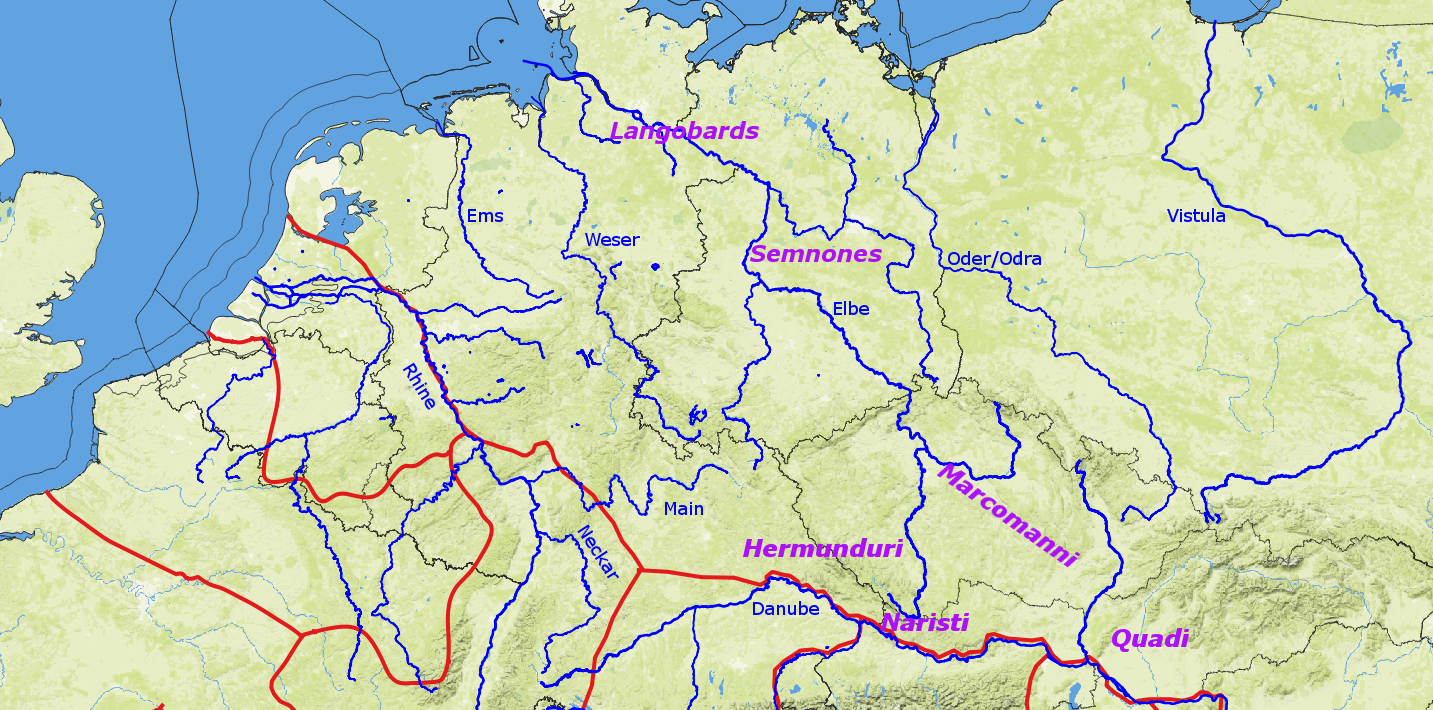
Approximate positions of some major Suebi peoples in the early 2nd century, in purple

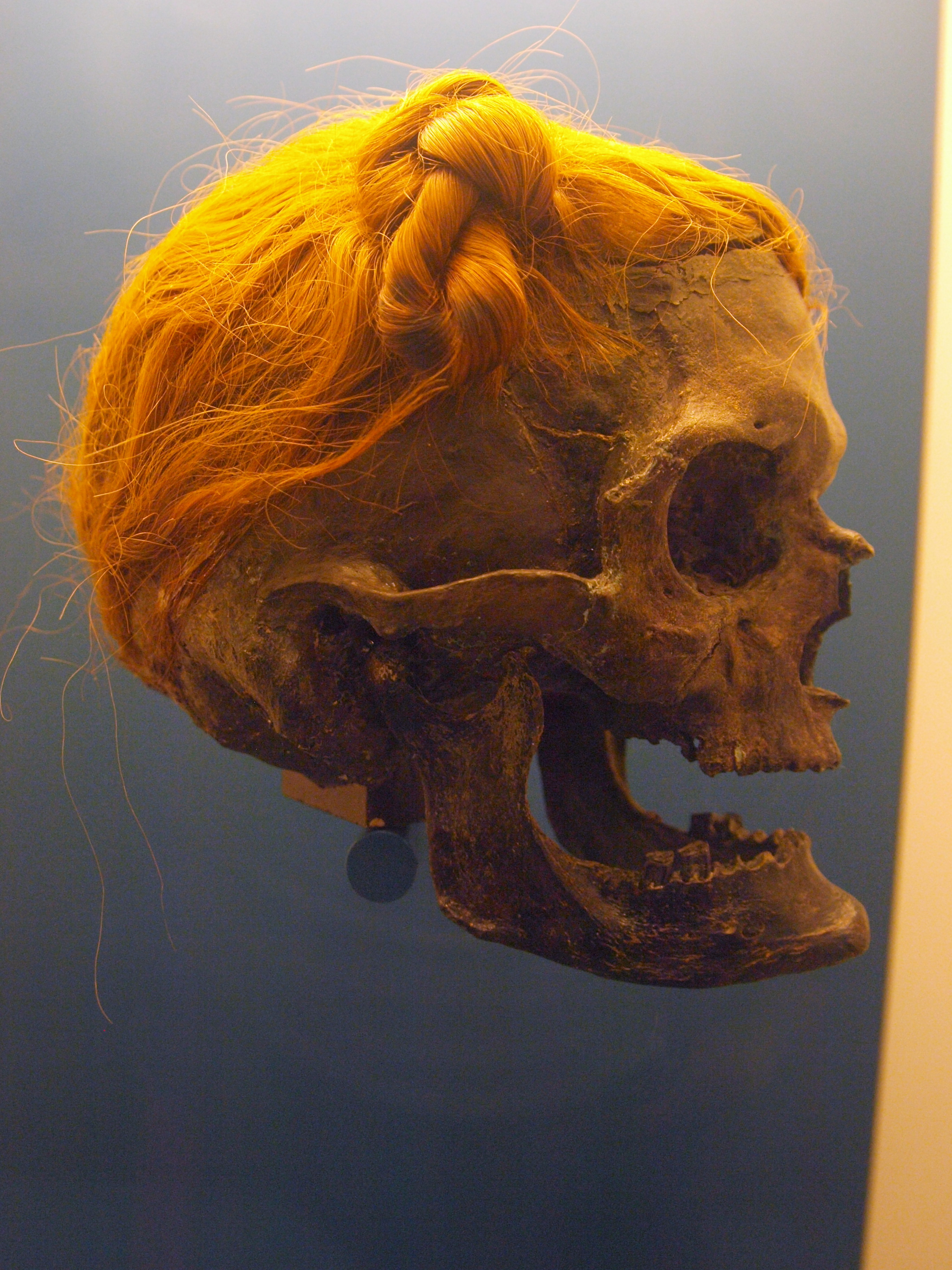
Osterby Man from northern Germany showing a Suebian knot, dated between 75 and 130 AD

The Suebi (also spelled Suevi or Suavi) were a large group of Germanic peoples first reported by Julius Caesar in the 1st century BC. In different contexts over several centuries, peoples within this umbrella category were sometimes simply called the Suebi, although all or most Suebian peoples had their own names as well. They originated near the Elbe River in what is now Eastern Germany. From there, Suebian groups spread across Central Europe, and in the 5th and 6th centuries some took over parts of Spain, Portugal and Italy. Archaeologically, the forerunners of the Suebi before contact with Rome are associated with the Jastorf culture. During the Roman imperial period the Suebi are associated with the so-called "Elbe Germanic peoples" who brought Elbe material culture into new areas to the south and southwest. Linguistically, although contemporary evidence for Roman-era Suebian language is scarce, they spoke a Germanic language, which is believed to be the main predecessor of medieval Old High German, and the modern German language, with all its related dialects.

With the advent of Roman dominance in the 1st and 2nd centuries AD, some Suebi moved into Roman controlled regions near the Neckar river, while a powerful Suebian alliance outside their control maintained a tense relationship with the Roman Empire further east. This was led by the Marcomanni, who settled with other Suebi in remote forests and mountains north of the Roman border along the Danube river, and maintained connections with Suebian peoples to their north. After their crushing defeat to the Romans in the Marcomannic Wars of the late 2nd century, many Suebi moved into the Roman Empire, or regrouped in areas near the Roman frontier. Notably, the diverse group who came to be known as the Alemanni, took control of Roman territory in what later became medieval Swabia - a cultural region in southern Germany that still bears a version of the Suebian name. During the 3rd and 4th centuries, the Romans were often raided by the Alemanni, Juthungi, Quadi and other Suebi, and attempts to subjugate them had limited success.

After the Battle of Adrianople in 378, the Suebi, Romans and other peoples of the Middle Danube were unsettled by the large-scale arrival of Huns, Goths, Alans, and other newcomers from eastern Europe. Around 406, many Middle Danubians, including many Suebi, moved far to the west, entering Roman Gaul, and disrupting it badly. A large group of them, probably including many Quadi and other Middle Danubians, entered Roman Hispania by 409, where a Roman civil war was in progress. There they established the Kingdom of the Suebi in Gallaecia (north-west Iberia), which lasted from 409 to 585. This was eventually absorbed by the Visigothic Kingdom, but its legacy survives in local place-names.

Many other Middle Danubians joined the Huns, and became part of the empire of Attila. After his death in 453 several kingdoms formed, and divided up the region. Among these, a short-lived Suebian kingdom was defeated by the Ostrogoths, and some of them travelled west to join the Alemanni, contributing to the ongoing ethnogenesis of the medieval Swabians. After the Ostrogoths left the region to conquer Italy in 493, the Suebian Langobards (Lombards), who had moved southwards from the Elbe region, filled the power vacuum in the Middle Danubian area and became dominant from around 500. They were willing to integrate other populations who agreed to follow their laws. In the still-Romanized areas between the Alemanni and Langobards, a new Germanic people called the Baiuvarii became the forerunners of the later Bavarians. Modern scholars categorize their language and material culture as Suebian, although they were not called Suebian in contemporary records. In 568 the Langobards entered Italy and established the Kingdom of the Lombards there. The Middle Danube was taken over by the Pannonian Avars, while Bavaria and Swabia became stem duchies of the Frankish empire.

== Name ==
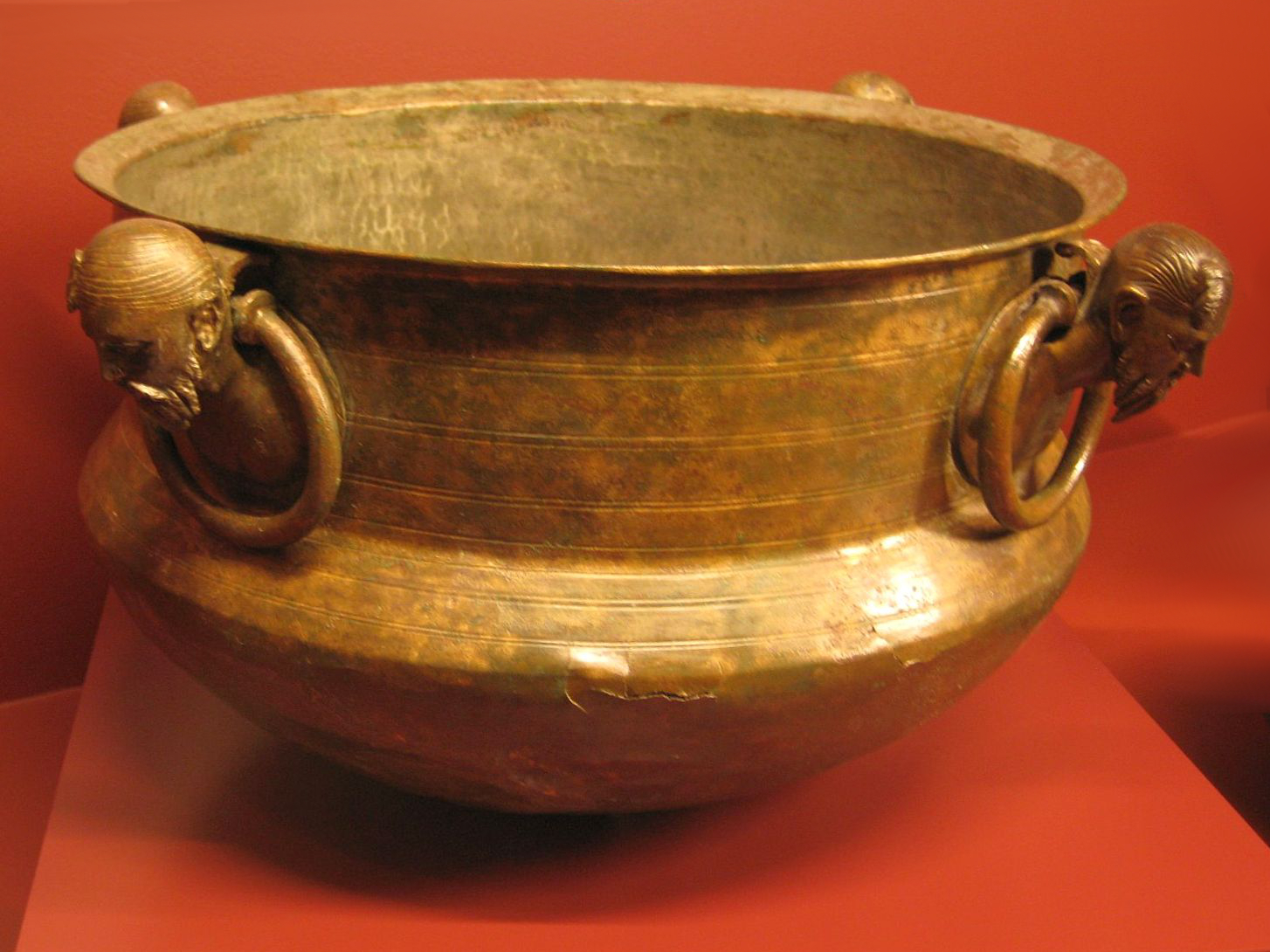
Mušov Cauldron, a Roman bronze cauldron found in 1988 in a Germanic chieftain's grave in Mušov, Czech Republic, dating to the 2nd century A.D. The cauldron is decorated by four cast heads of Germanic men wearing a Suebian knot hairstyle

The spelling form "Suebi" is the dominant one in classical times, while the common variant "Suevi" also appears throughout history. Around 300-600 AD spellings such as Suaevi, Suavi, and Σούαβοι started to occur, because of a sound shift which occurred in West Germanic at this time. However, the classical spellings also continued to be used. The Proto-Germanic pronunciation is reconstructed as *swēbōz (plural), *swēbaz (singular).

Throughout the 19th century, numerous attempts to propose a Germanic etymology for the name were made which are no longer accepted by scholars. The most widely accepted proposal today is that the word is related to a reconstructed Germanic adjective *swēsa- meaning “one’s own", which is also found in other ethnic names including the Germanic Suiones (Swedes).

The similarity between the Suebian name and the reconstructed Germanic word *sebjō meaning "clan", “related" or "family” is generally seen as indicating that the two words are related, and this is seen as relevant for attempts to explain the second part of the name. Notably, the name of the Semnones, who Tacitus described as the original and most prestigious Suebi, may also have a similar etymology. Linguists generally believe that this name was pronounced as Sebnō, and derived from Proto Indo-European *swe-bh(o)-n meaning “of one’s own kind”, with an n-suffix that expresses belonging. The Suebi would then be “those who are of their own kind”, while the Semnones would be “those who belong to those of their own kind”.

In contrast, Rübekeil argues that the relevant Proto Indo-European suffix to explain the Germanic name of the Suebi is not -bho-, which was a suffix used to create adverbs from adjectives. Instead he proposes it was a suffix *-bū- based on the verb to be, *bʰuH-, with a syllabic lengthening which changed the meaning to “belonging to”. The Proto Indo-European root noun *swe-b(h)ū- would mean roughly “self-being”.

Alternatively, it has also been argued that it was borrowed from a Celtic word for "vagabond".

== One people, or many peoples ==
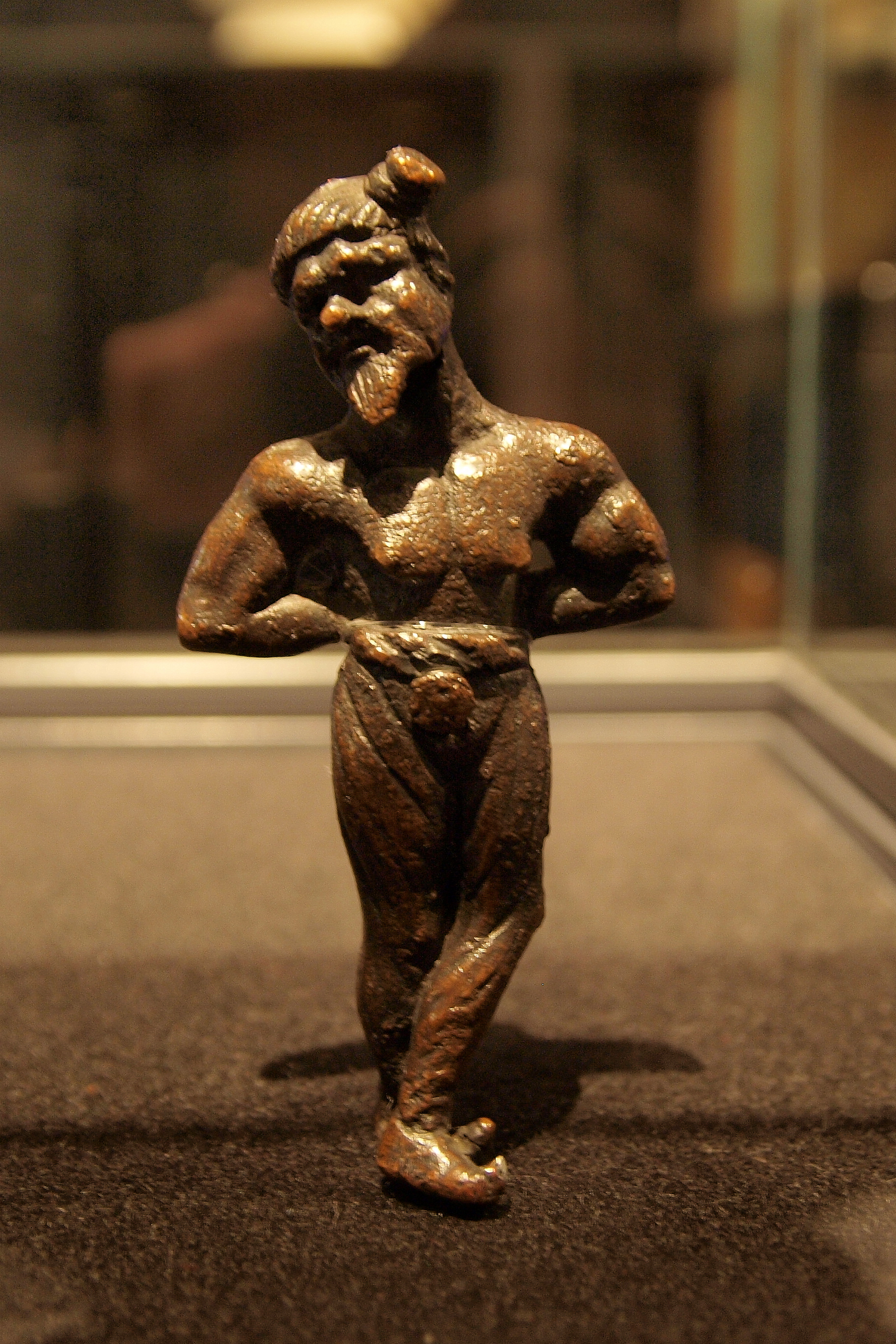
A chained prisoner wears breeches and has a suebian knot. 2nd century AD bronze, Vienna

In Caesar's first report about events in 58 BC, the Suebi were described as a single large tribe, who were nomadic but living in this period between the Ubii and Cherusci, somewhere between the Rhine and Elbe, where they were a threatening presence for the peoples near the Rhine. A single large Suebi tribe in this region was described again in the following generation, when several classical sources describe their crushing defeat by Drusus the Elder in 9 BC. Like Caesar, these authors mentioned the Marcomanni as a distinct allied people who were also defeated in the Roman campaigns of both 58 BC and 9 BC.

After the many victories of Rome in Germania, first century authors such as Strabo, Pliny the Elder, and Tacitus began to perceive the Suebi as a group of tribes, rather than a single tribe. Writing in the early third century Dio Cassius claimed that many peoples had simply decided to call themselves Suebi over time. Modern scholars doubt this, and suggest that Romans may not have originally been aware that tribes such as the Marcomanni and Semnones saw themselves as Suebi.

Strabo, writing in about 23 AD, described the Suebi not only as the largest people (Koine Greek: ἔθνος) of the region between Rhine and Elbe, stretching from the one river to the other, but also as an umbrella category including large, well-known tribes. The Semnones are described as one of the largest Suebian peoples, and are listed among the peoples ruled by Maroboduus at that time. Strabo says that this king settled his own people, the Marcomanni, along with some Suebian peoples (ἔθνη, plural) and other peoples, in the Hercynian Forest, but not all Suebi were in this forest. Other Suebi had moved to the eastern bank of the Rhine, forcing the original inhabitants to cross the river and enter the empire. The Hermunduri and Langobardi are also described as Suebi, and are described as living east of the Elbe.

Notably, Pliny, writing in about 70 AD, did not explicitly describe the Suebi as an umbrella category, but reported instead that the Suebi, the Hermunduri, the Chatti, and the Cherusci were all in the same ancient race (Latin: genus) of the Germani called the Hermiones, who all lived inland. In this account there were only five Germanic races. These Hermiones had previously been mentioned by Pomponius Mela in about 43 AD in his Description of the World (III.3.31). He called them the farthest people of Germania, who lived east of the Elbe.

Tacitus, writing around 100 AD, was very clear that the Suebi "are not one single people" (gens), and that "they occupy a larger part of Germania, and though still divided into distinct nations and names" (nationibus nominibusque discreti), they are collectively referred to as Suebi". He repeated the names of three of the five races mentioned by Pliny, including the Hermiones, noting that these are celebrated in "old songs" (celebrant carminibus antiquis) which describe how they descend from an ancestor Mannus. However, he then adds that some people "taking the liberty allowed by antiquity", assert that other names of peoples (gentis appellationes), among which he lists the Suebi, "are also true and ancient names" (vera et antiqua nomina).

Tacitus noted that the Semnones, who lived on the Elbe, were believed to be the head (Latin: caput), and origin of the Suebian people (initia gentis). Like the Suebi described by Caesar they lived in 100 pagi. Their reputation was reinforced by their sacred grove where "all the people (populi) of the same name and blood come together", referring to all Suebi, and not just all Semnones. Nevertheless, the Marcomanni "stand first in strength and renown".

Unlike Strabo, Tacitus attempted to describe the situation east of the Elbe. He implied that nearly all the eastern peoples living between the Elbe and Vistula, and north into Scandinavia, were Suebi. In modern scholarship it has sometimes alternatively been proposed that the name Suebi may have even been the name which the Germanic peoples used to refer to themselves, as opposed to the Latin name Germani. In contrast, others propose that the Romans themselves popularized the use of the term Suebi as an umbrella category. Like the term Germani, it was a handy term for referring to northern tribes whose real names were not clear to Romans. It has even been claimed by Herwig Wolfram that in the first centuries AD, classical ethnography applied the name Suebi to so many Germanic tribes that it almost replaced the term Germani which Caesar had originally made popular.

Roman sources subsequently continued to use the term "Suebi", but they used it less for several centuries, probably because they were now better informed about the names of individual tribes. In the late fourth century, as the Quadi and Marcomanni disappear from the record, the more generic term Suebi once again became common in Roman records, and several new Suebian polities came into being. The Kingdom of the Suebi in Hispania was founded in the early 5th century, and at least one Suebian polity appeared near the Middle Danube after the death of Attila the Hun in 453.

== Language ==
While there is uncertainty about the languages of the first tribes identified by Romans as Germani, the Suebi are generally agreed to have spoken one or more Germanic languages within the West Germanic group. Modern languages which have evolved at least partly from Suebian languages include standard German itself, and especially the two main dialect groups in the south, Alemannic German on the one hand, including Swabian, Alsatian and Swiss German, and Bavarian and Austrian German on the other hand.

The divisions of early West Germanic are a subject of scholarly debate. By the early Middle Ages, West Germanic was spoken not only by peoples known to have Suebian roots, such as the Langobards and Alemanni, but also by Franks, Saxons, Frisians, Anglo-Saxons, and Thuringians who were never called Suebi. In late classical times, the southern dialects associated with Suebian histories experienced the High German consonant shift that defines modern High German languages. However, before the advent of this consonant shift, the dialects of all or most West Germanic speakers are believed to have already been in a single West Germanic dialect continuum. High German can't therefore simply be equated to Suebian ancestry or ethnicity. According to Volker Harm, the relative unification of West Germanic before the consonant shift must instead be a result of the population movements of the fourth and fifth centuries, which involved the mixing of peoples into large new groups.

In contrast, in the 20th century it was often assumed based on non-linguistic evidence that the Suebian dialects must have already been distinct from Frankish dialects even before the consonant shift. According to this scheme, based on the work of Friedrich Maurer:

- "Elbe Germanic", which is originally (and still) a term used for a roughly-defined imperial-era archaeological region, is also a term used to refer to the purported ancestor of the languages in the south which later incurred the consonant shift, including Alemannic, Bavarian and Langobardic. According to this type of proposal the Elbe Germani can also be equated to Suebi in the broad sense of the term. Furthermore, these archaeological and linguistic categories are equated to the Irminones, who were named in classical ethnography as an ancient, pre-imperial division of the Germanic peoples.
- The ancestor of the Frankish dialects of West Germanic is similarly identified with a proposed language connected to the imperial-era "Weser-Rhine" (or Rhine-Weser) archaeological category, and the pre-imperial Istvaeones.

Maurer originally named these as two of his proposed five major Germanic Kulturkreise or "culture-groups". He was rejecting the proposal based upon linguistic evidence, which is that the ancestors of the Franks and Alemanni were in one West Germanic linguistic group. Maurer's approach of equating medieval language differences, with imperial-era archaeological categories, and legends about pre-imperial categories, was influenced by the controversial but influential methodology of Gustaf Kossinna.

== Archaeology ==
In terms of archaeological evidence, the precursor of the Suebi in the early Roman-imperial era (roughly 1-166 AD, German: Ältere Römische Kaiserzeit) were in the Jastorf culture which existed in the pre-Roman Iron age (roughly before 1 BC, Vorrömische Eisenzeit) in what is now Eastern Germany and Schleswig-Holstein, centred around the Elbe river and its main tributaries.

In the archaeology of the Roman imperial era as a whole (1-400 AD, Römische Kaiserzeit), the Suebi are associated with the so-called "Elbe Germanic peoples". This term (Elbgermanen) is commonly used in Germany-related archaeological scholarship, referring to populations who brought Jastorf-related material culture to new areas south and southwest of the Elbe, towards the Roman frontiers on the Rhine and Danube. In other regions west of the Elbe, archaeologists contrast the Elbe Germanic peoples with their Roman era contemporaries, the Weser-Rhine Germanic peoples to their north, and North Sea Germanic peoples still further north on the North Sea coast. All three of these archaeological complexes were however influenced by the earlier Jastorf culture. All three expanded westwards at the expense of earlier, pre-imperial material cultures such as the La Tène culture which is associated with Celtic languages.

In modern archaeological scholarship the 1st-century movement of Suebi into new regions is more specifically associated with the "Grossromstedt Horizon", which was influenced not only by the Jastorf culture but also by the Przeworsk culture from further east in present day Poland. It first appeared in central parts of present day Western Germany, for example near the Main river. It then appears in what is now the Czech Republic and western Slovakia. Scholars associate this with the Suebian settlements made in the mountains and forests by Maroboduus, as reported in classical sources. The variant of this horizon which associated with the Suebi of Maroboduus, is called the Plaňany-Group.

The Alemanni first appear in historical records in the 3rd century, and were not called Suebi by contemporary authors. They only started to be referred to as Swabian in the early Middle Ages, for reasons which are no longer clear. While linguistic evidence is no longer seen as a basis for distinguishing the earliest Alemanni from the non-Suebian Franks to the north, as Maurer sought to do, scholars continue to accept archaeological evidence for their Elbe Germanic origins. However, the incoming population did not arrive as a cohesive “tribe”. The evidence speaks for wide-reaching communication, and ongoing contacts with distant regions, going beyond central Germany and as far away as Mecklenburg and Bohemia.

== Classical descriptions ==
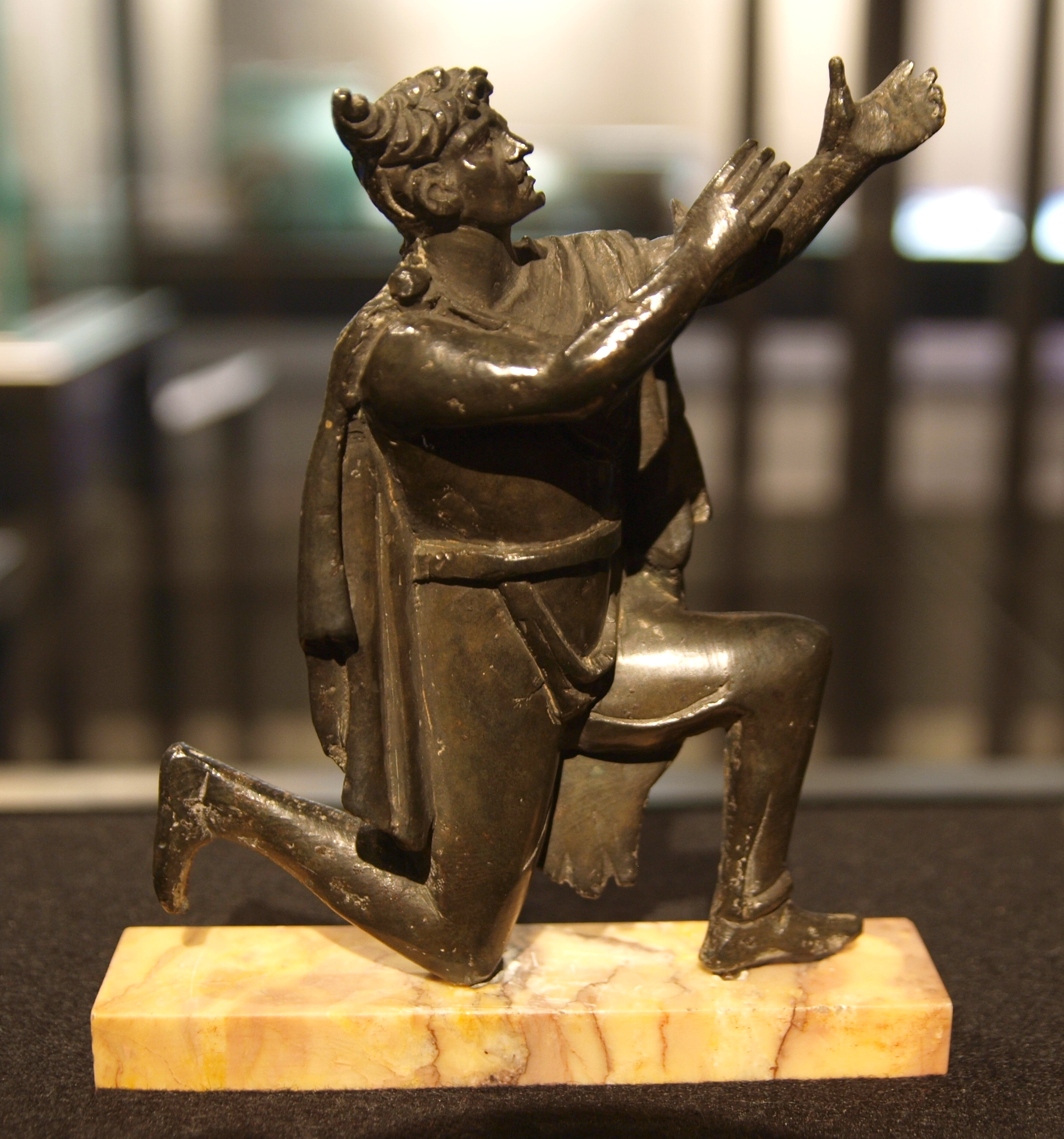
Roman bronze statuette. Bibliothèque Nationale de France

In his account of the Gallic Wars, Julius Caesar first noted the important role of Suebian forces in the invasion of Gaul in 58 BC, which was led by king Ariovistus, whose first wife was Suebian. Caesar however calls him a king of Germani, and uses that as an umbrella term to cover peoples from east of the Rhine, including the Suebi. Caesar was the first author to clearly distinguish Germani and Gauls, and define the Rhine as the boundary between them. He helped create an important tradition which is still influential today, of emphasizing their dedication to war, contrasting their habits to the soft Mediterranean way of living which he believed had also weakened the Gauls. However, Caesar had political reasons for emphasizing the weakness of the Gauls and strength of the Germani, because this was used to justify his controversial conquest of Gaul back in Rome.

Among the Germani, Caesar particularly emphasized the danger posed by the Suebi. This tradition was later followed by Strabo and Tacitus. In a special digression he called them the largest and the most warlike nation (Latin: gens) of all the Germanic peoples (Latin: Germani). They were constantly engaged in war, animal husbandry, and hunting. They had little agriculture, with no private ownership of land, and a rule against living in one place for more than one year. They were divided into 100 districts (Latin: pagi), each of which could supply a thousand men for military campaigns which were sent out every year. They were powerful enough to force the peoples near them to keep a large swathe of lands around them unoccupied.

Strabo similarly reported that the Suebi were different to more settled and agricultural tribes such as the Chatti and Cherusci, saying that "they do not till the soil or even store up food, but live in small huts that are merely temporary structures; and they live for the most part off their flocks, as the nomads do, so that, in imitation of the nomads, they load their household belongings on their wagons and with their beasts turn whithersoever they think best".

Tacitus wrote a more detailed work, his Germania, which continued the theme of showing how the Germani, and especially the Suebi, were constantly preparing for war. He associated the Suebi with the so-called "Suebian knot", the fashion of pulling back their hair, and tying it in a high knot. According to Tacitus, this fashion was not restricted to the Suebi, but he believed that young people in other tribes had imitated them, and the fashion helped the Suebi distinguish themselves from both other Germani, and from their slaves. The nobles had taller and more elaborate knots in order to increase their stature and to strike fear. Modern historians do not think that these knots were a reliable indicator of ethnicity.

Tacitus also described how the Suebi attended rituals involving human sacrifice, in a sacred grove in the land of the Semnones. In another passage he notes that some Suebi sacrifice to a goddess he interpreted to be Isis. He believed this was an imported foreign rite, because the image of Isis is fashioned like a light galley. In general he claimed that the Germani "do not consider it consistent with the grandeur of celestial beings to confine the gods within walls, or to liken them to the form of any human countenance. They consecrate woods and groves, and they apply the names of deities to the abstraction which they see only in spiritual worship".

== The Gaulish campaigns of Julius Caesar ==
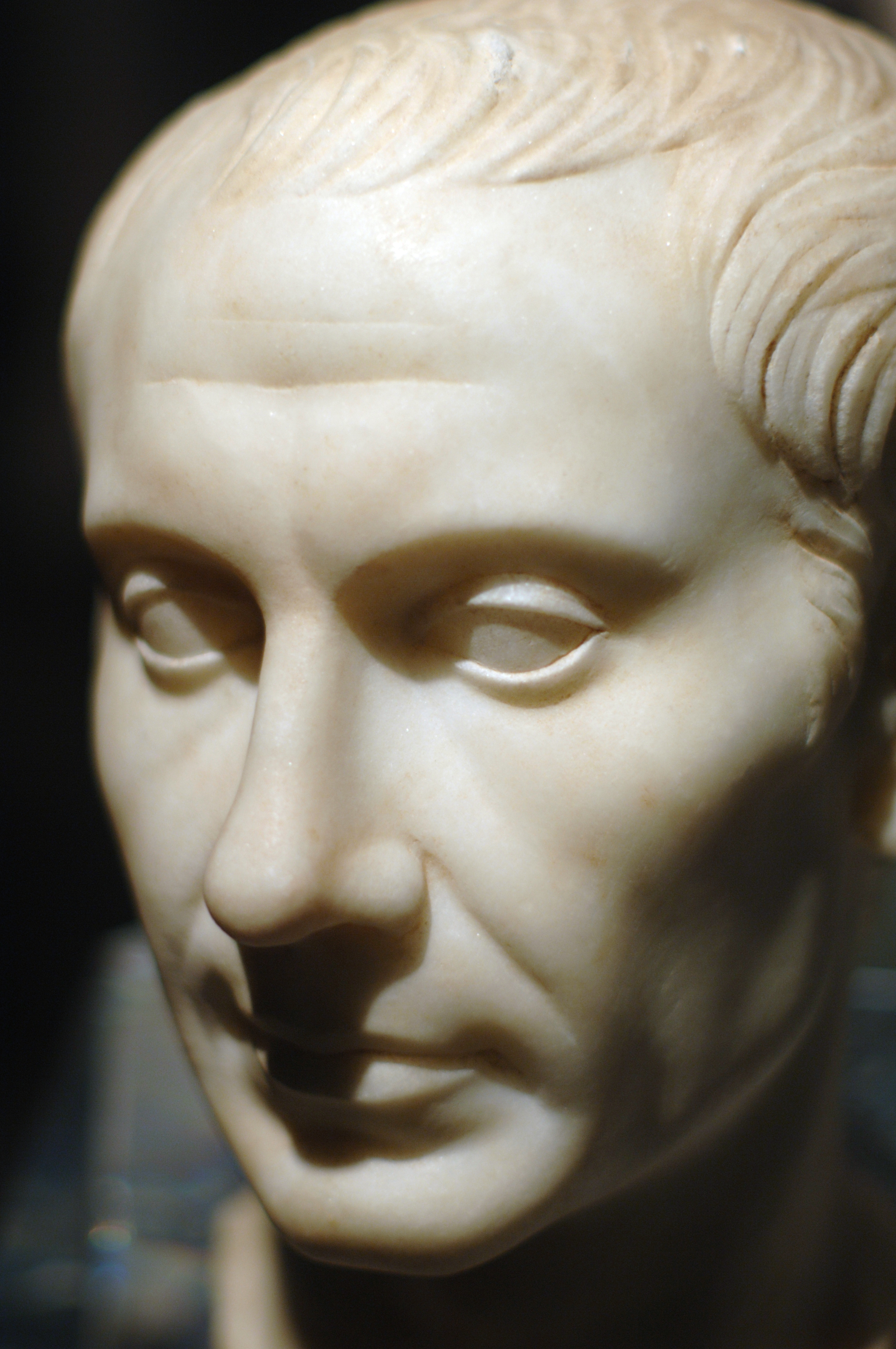
Marble bust of Julius Caesar, first century C.E.; recent discovery on the Island of Pantelleria.

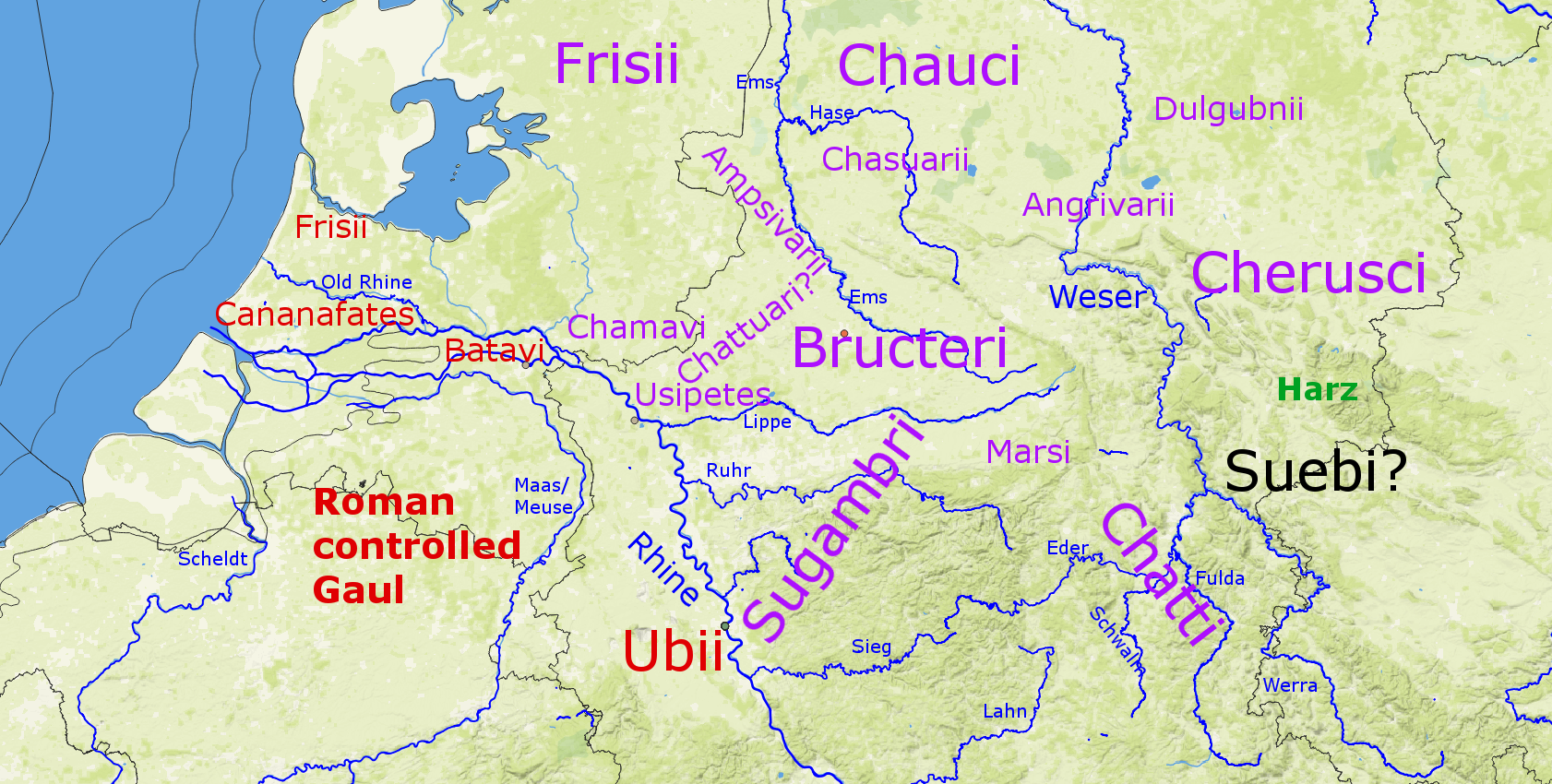
The approximate locations of the Suebi in about 10 BC

In 58 BC Julius Caesar (100 BC – 15 March 44 BC) confronted a large army from beyond the Rhine led by a king named Ariovistus. He had a Suebian wife and may have been Suebian himself. The population which he ruled had already been settled for some years in Gaul, having arrived at the invitation of a local tribe, the Sequani, who lived between the Saône and the Jura Mountains which now form the border between France and Switzerland. Ariovistus had helped fight against another local tribe, the Aedui, who lived west of the Saône and he had already been recognized as a king by the Roman senate. Caesar on the other hand entered into the conflict to defend the Aedui. As part of his justification for intervention into Gaul Caesar was the first author to make a distinction between peoples from west of the Rhine in Gaul, and the Germani (or Germanic peoples) from east of the Rhine, who he argued to be a potential source of continuing invasions that would affect Italy.

When Caesar arrived in the area, ambassadors from the Treviri, Gauls who lived further north near the Moselle, arrived to report that 100 pagi of Suebi had been led to the Rhine by two brothers, Nasuas and Cimberius. Caesar needed to move quickly in order to stop them joining forces. Other Suebi appear among the peoples Caesar listed in the battle line-up of Ariovistus himself: "Harudes, Marcomanni, Tribocci, Vangiones, Nemetes, Sedusii, and Suevi". Caesar defeated Ariovistus in battle, forcing him to escape across the Rhine. When news of this spread, the fresh Suebian forces turned back in some panic, and the Ubii who lived on the east bank near modern Cologne took advantage of the situation to attack them.

In 55 BC, having escalated his intervention into a conquest of all of Gaul for Rome, Caesar decided to bridge the Rhine and attack the country of the Sugambri, and then moved south to the country of the Ubii in order to confront the Suebi in their own country east of them. The Suebi abandoned their towns (oppida) closest to the Romans, retreated to the Silva Bacenis forest and assembled an army. After 18 days Caesar moved back across the bridge and broke it down, stating that he had achieved his objective. In 53 BC Caesar found that the Treviri had received auxiliary forces from the Suebi, and he built a new bridge and this time established a fort. Ubian spies gave him updates about the movements of the Suebi.

Archaeological evidence implies the replacement of the older La Tène culture east of the Rhine, which had been similar to the Celtic-associated cultures found in Gaul, began at about this time. This is consistent with the reports of disruption in these areas given by Caesar and Strabo. Disruption near the Rhine may have already begun before Caesar's arrival in the area.

== The Germanic campaigns of Augustus ==
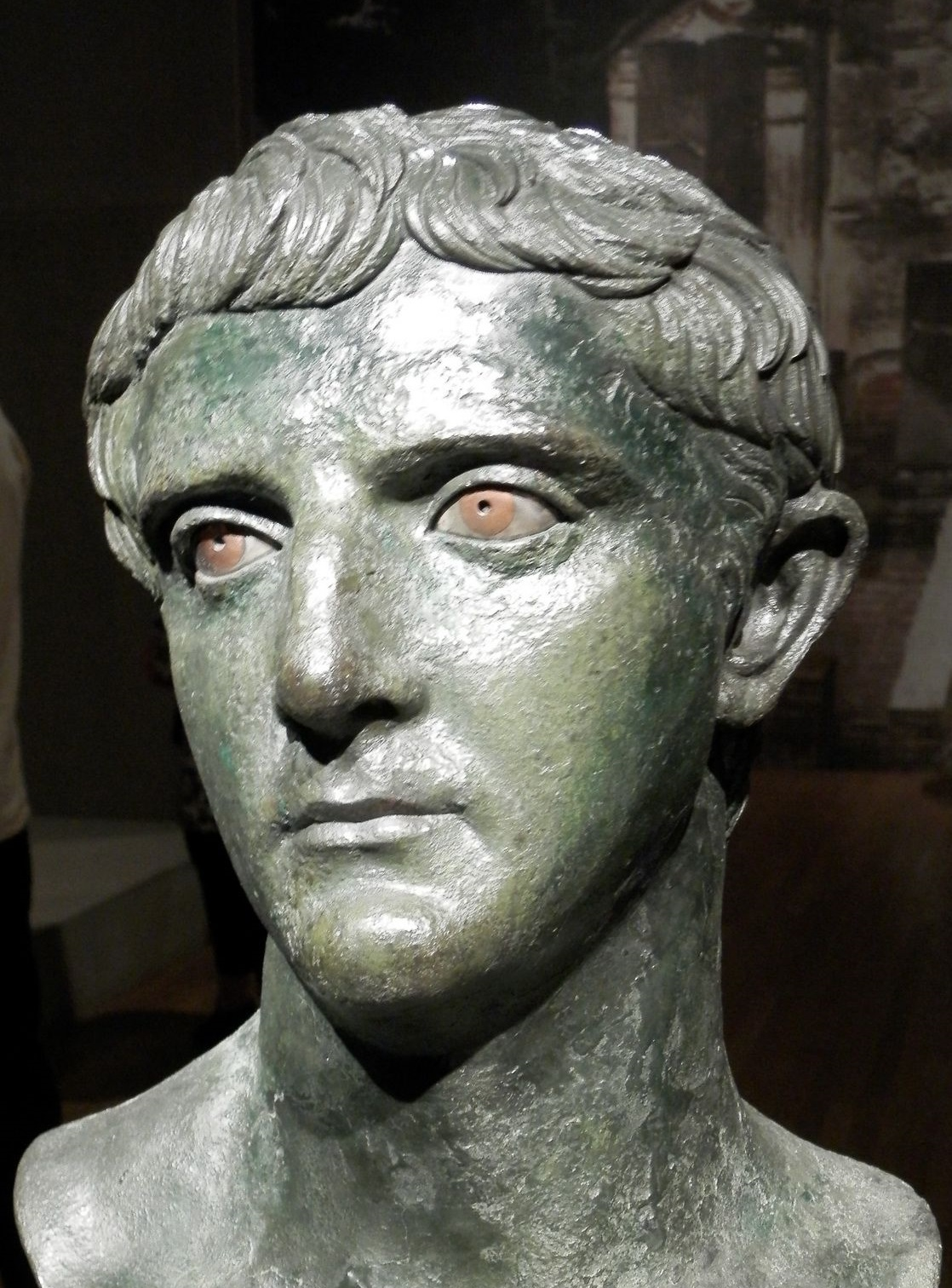
Bronze bust of Nero Claudius Drusus in the National Archaeological Museum, Naples

After Caesar's conquest, Rome controlled Gaul west of the Rhine. Shortly before 29 BC, the Suebi crossed the Rhine, and were defeated by the Roman governor in Gaul, Gaius Carrinas. Along with the young Octavian Caesar (the future Augustus), Carrinas celebrated a triumph in 29 BC. Shortly afterwards, captured Suebians fought as gladiators against captured Dacians at Rome.

In 9 BC, the Suebi - again referring to as a single people - were defeated by Drusus the Elder, who had already defeated several other peoples including the Marcomanni. Florus reported that the Cherusci, Suebi and Sicambri formed an alliance marked by the crucifixion of twenty Roman centurions. Drusus defeated them with great difficulty, and then confiscated their plunder and sold them into slavery so that "there was such peace in Germany that the inhabitants seemed changed", "the very climate milder and softer than it used to be". Suetonius reported that the Suebi and Sugambri "were taken into Gaul and settled in lands near the Rhine" while other Germani were pushed "to the farther side of the river Albis" (Elbe). Elsewhere Suetonius mentioned that in Germania the future emperor Tiberius settled 40,000 prisoners of war. Possibly these were settled near the bank of the Rhine.

Orosius claimed that the Marcomanni were nearly wiped out after their defeat during this campaign. In the Res Gestae Divi Augusti which celebrates the reign of Augustus, it is boasted that among the many kings who took refuge with Augustus as royal suppliants, there was one "of the Marcomanni of the Suebi". The name of this king is no longer legible on the Monumentum Ancyranum, but it ended with "-rus".

After these major defeats, the Marcomanni and many Suebi came under the leadership of King Maroboduus, a member of the Marcomanni royal family who had grown up in Rome. Tacitus also calls him a king of the Suebi. Strabo described how he led his people and others into the Hercynian Forest and established his royal capital at Buiaimon (somewhere in or near Bohemia, which still carries the name). He noted that Suebi lived both in the forest, and outside of it. Velleius Paterculus described Boiohaemum, where Maroboduus and the Marcomanni lived, as "plains surrounded by the Hercynian forest", and he said this was the only part of Germania which the Romans did not control in the period before the Roman defeat at the Battle of the Teutoburg Forest in 9 AD.

Velleius said that Maroboduus drilled his Bohemian soldiers to almost Roman standards, and that although his policy was to avoid conflict with Rome, the Romans came to be concerned that he could invade Italy. "Races and individuals who revolted from us [the Romans] found in him a refuge." From a Roman point of view he noted that the closest point of access for an attack upon Bohemia would be via Carnuntum. This was between present-day Vienna and Bratislava, where the Morava river enters the Danube. However, just when legions were being gathered for a two-pronged attack upon the Marcomanni the Great Illyrian revolt broke out, affecting the Roman provinces south of the Marcomanni from 6-9 AD.

No sooner had the Illyrian wars been ended in 9 AD when Rome's dominance of the land northwest of the Marcomanni, between Rhine and Elbe, was also severely checked by the rebellion of the Cherusci and their allies. This began with the annihilation of three legions at the Battle of Teutoburg Forest. The kingdom of the Marcomanni and their allies stayed out of the conflict, and when Maroboduus was sent the head of the defeated Roman leader Varus, he sent it on to Rome for burial. Augustus assigned Germanicus, the son of Drusus the Elder, to lead the Roman forces on the Rhine, but the emperor died in 14 AD.

Around 0 AD, archaeological materials consistent with Elbe origins begin to appear in areas near the Rhine river. This includes the southern Main river, and on the Neckar some decades later. Other Elbe-style communities between the Main, Rhine and Danube formed later. The exact nature of their relationship with the incoming Romans is unknown, but within generations these communities were using Roman technologies, and the Neckar Suebi, as they were known, were recognized as a Roman civitas.

== Roman relations after Augustus ==
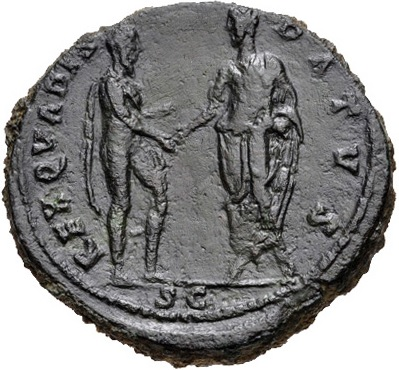
A sesterce of Antoninus Pius, 143 AD which says REX QUADIS DATUS (King given to Quadi)

Germanicus fought for three years against the Cherusci and their allies. He defeated Arminius, but did not capture or kill him. The new emperor Tiberius however didn't seek to install a Roman administration in Germania, and Germanicus was recalled. Instead the Romans acted to sow discord between the Germani themselves. The Langobardi and Semnones, Suebi living on the Elbe not far from the Cherusci, defected from the kingdom of Maroboduus in the name of freedom, both because Maroboduus did not support the revolt, and because they objected to his royal power.

In 17 AD war broke out among these two alliances of Germanic peoples, led by Arminius and Maroboduus, which now had Suebi on both sides. Maroboduus requested help from Rome but according to Tacitus the Romans claimed that Maroboduus "had no right to invoke the aid of Roman arms against the Cherusci, when he had rendered no assistance to the Romans in their conflict with the same enemy". After an indecisive battle, Maroboduus withdrew into the hilly forests of Bohemia in 18 AD. The Romans urged the Germani "to complete the destruction of the now broken power of Maroboduus". This was all in line with the new foreign policy of the emperor Tiberius.

In 19 AD, Maroboduus was deposed and exiled by Catualda, who was a prince who had been living in exile among the Gutones to the north, in what is now northern Poland. (Tacitus claims that the Gutones were more accepting of royalty than most Germani. Strabo mentions the "Butones" as one of the non-Suebian subject peoples of Maroboduus, and this may have been the same people.) Maroboduus went into exile among the Romans and lived another 18 years in Ravenna. Catualda's victory was short-lived. He was in turn deposed by Vibilius of the Hermunduri that same year he came to power, 19 AD. The subjects of Maroboduus and Catualda, presumably mainly Marcomanni, were moved by the Romans to an area near the Danube, between the Morava and "Cusus" rivers, and placed under the control of the Quadian king Vannius. The area where Vannius ruled over the Marcomanni exiles is generally considered to have been a state distinct from the old Quadi kingdom itself. Unfortunately the Cusus river has not been identified with certainty. However, Slovak archaeological research locates a core area of the Vannius kingdom was probably in the fertile southwestern Slovak lowlands around Trnava, east of the Little Carpathians.

Vannius personally benefitted from the new situation and became very wealthy and unpopular. He was himself eventually also deposed by Vibilius and the Hermunduri, working together with the Lugii, who were another non-Suebian subject people from the north, in 50/51 AD. This revolt by Vibilius was coordinated with the nephews of Vannius, Vangio and Sido, who then divided his realm between themselves as loyal Roman client kings. Vannius was defeated and fled with his followers across the Danube, where they were assigned land in Roman Pannonia. This settlement is associated with Germanic finds from the 1st century AD in Burgenland, west of Lake Neusiedl.

In 69 AD, the "Year of the Four Emperors", two kings named Sido and Italicus, the latter perhaps the son of Vangio, fought on the side of Vespasian in a Roman civil war. Tacitus described them as kings of the Suebi, and emphasized their loyalty to Rome. They were present at the second battle of Bedriacum in 69 AD at Cremona.

The relationship between the Suebi and Romans stabilized but was interrupted under emperor Domitian during the years 89-97 AD, after the Quadi and Marcomanni refused to assist in a conflict against the Dacians. In 89 AD Domitian entered Pannonia to make war, killed the peace envoys sent to him, and was then defeated by the Marcomanni. This campaign was referred to as the war against the Suebi, or the Suebi and Sarmatians, or the Marcomanni, Quadi and Sarmatians. The relationship then stabilized again in the time of emperor Nerva (reigned 96-98). Writing in this period, Tacitus noted that both the Marcomanni and their neighbours the Quadi still had "kings of their own nation, descended from the noble stock of Maroboduus and Tudrus". However, he noted that they submit to foreigners, and their strength and power depend on Roman influence. Rome supported them by arms, and according to Tacitus, "more frequently by our money". To the west of the Marcomanni, Tacitus noted two other powerful Suebian states, the Hermunduri, whose lands were concentrated in Bohemia near the sources of the Elbe, but they were also allowed to settle and trade as far as the Danubian border in Roman Raetia in present day Bavaria. Between the Hermunduri and Marcomanni north of the Danube were also the Naristi (also known as the Varisti).

== Marcomannic wars ==
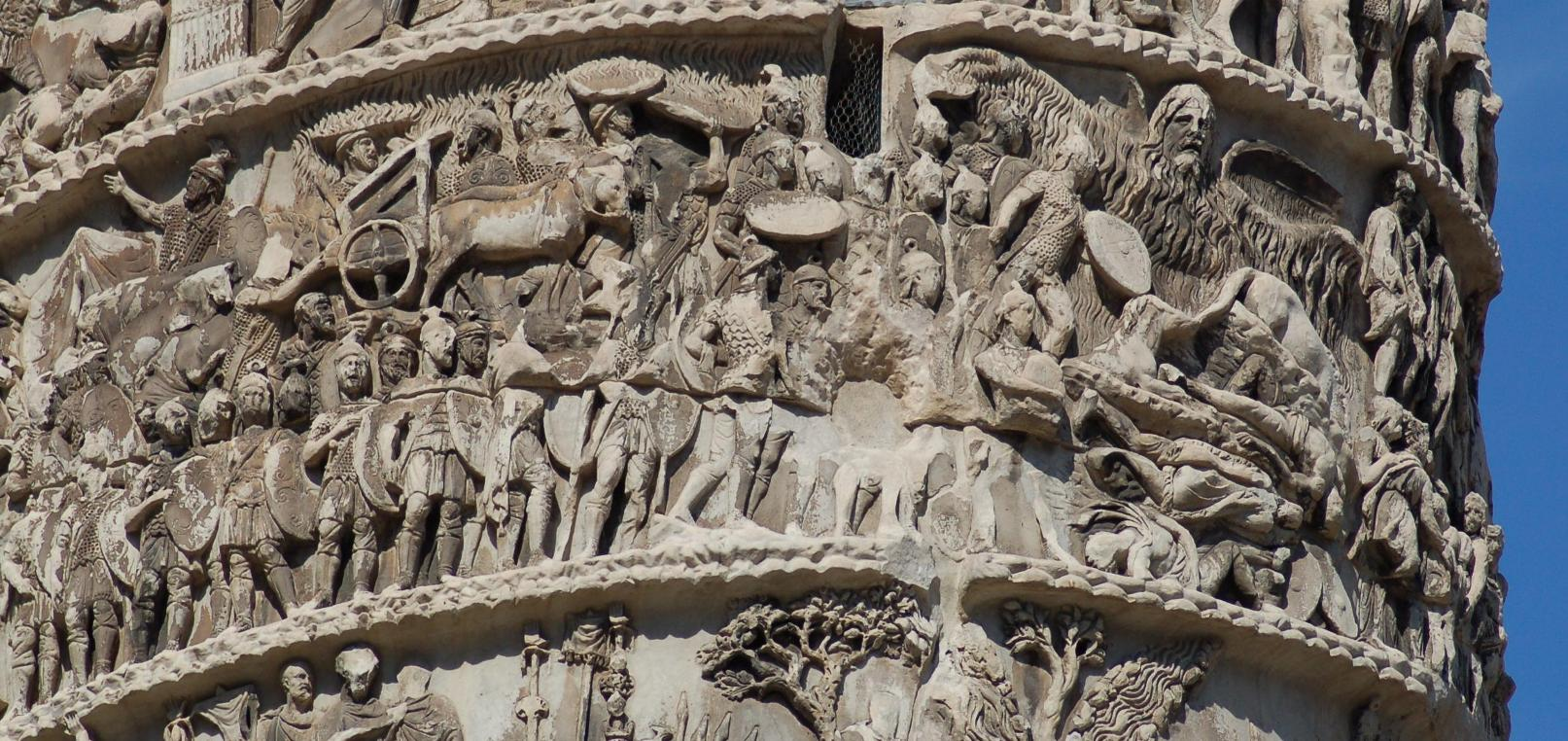
The "Miracle of the Rain" depicted on the Column of Marcus Aurelius in Rome

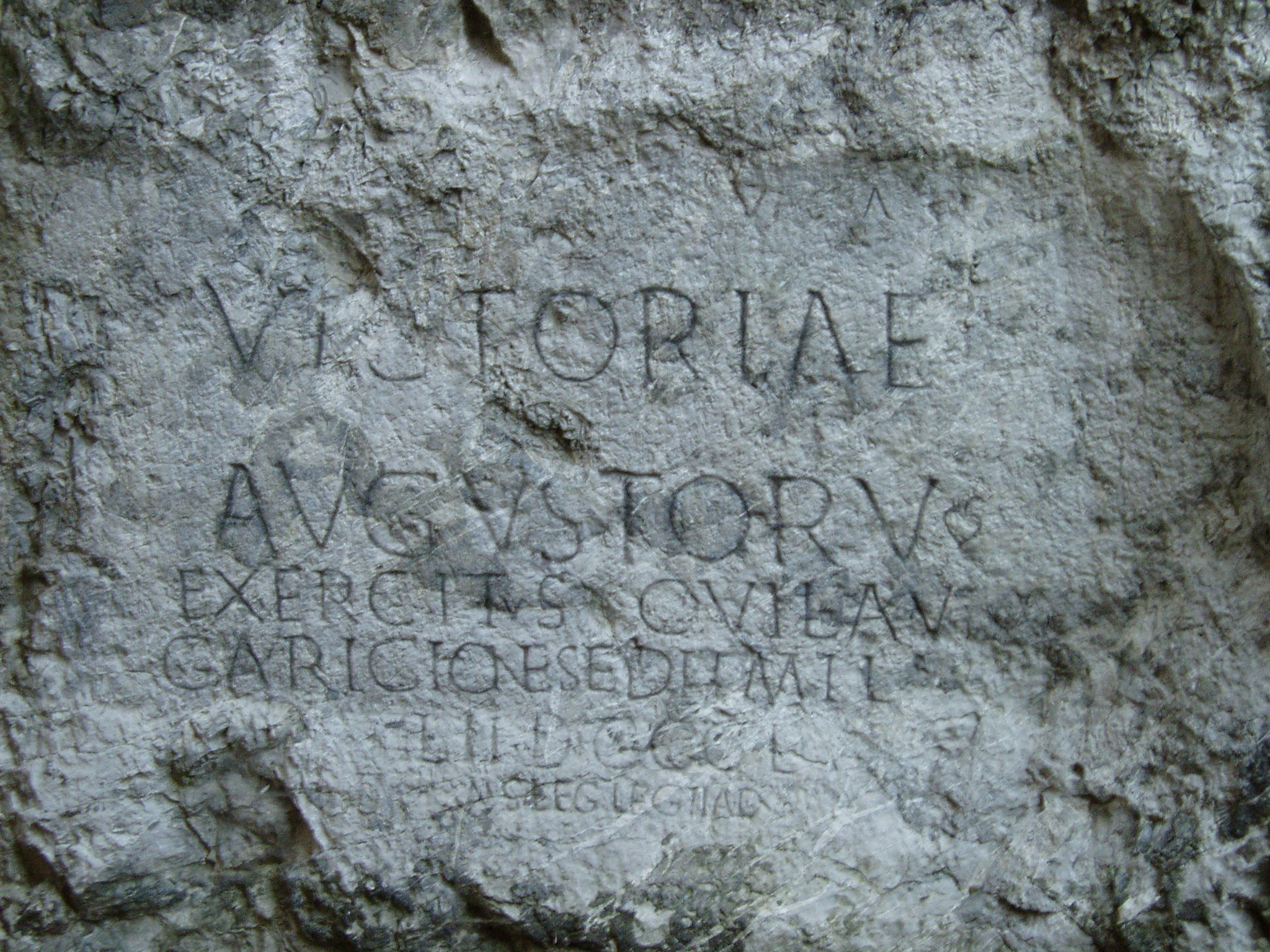
A monument found in Trenčín. "To the victory of emperor dedicated by 855 soldiers of II. Legion of an army stationed in Laugaricio. Made to order of Marcus Valerius Maximianus, a legate of the Second Auxiliary legion."

The relationship between the Romans and the Suebian alliance was seriously disrupted and permanently changed during the long series of conflicts called the Marcomannic or Germanic wars, which were fought mainly during the rule of emperor Marcus Aurelius (reigned 161-180 AD). It was triggered by a raid across the Danube in the 150s or 160s AD, by Suebian Langobardi, together with Obii whose identity is uncertain.

A group of the nations living north of the Danube border selected Ballomarius, king of the Marcomanni, and ten other national representatives, to go on a peace mission to the governor of Roman Pannonia. Oaths were sworn and the envoys returned home. The Romans were apparently planning for a Germania campaign, and knew that Italy itself was threatened by these peoples, but were deliberately diplomatic while they were occupied with the Parthian campaign in the Middle East, and badly affected by the Antonine plague.

Although a Roman offensive could not start in 167 AD, two new legions were raised and in 168 AD the two emperors, Lucius Verus and Marcus Aurelius, set out to cross the alps. Either in 167 AD, before the Romans setting, or in 169 AD, after the Romans came to a stop when Verus died, the Marcomanni and Quadi led a crossing of the Danube, and an attack into Italy itself. They destroyed Opitergium (present-day Oderzo) and put the important town of Aquileia under siege. Whatever the exact sequence of events, the Historia Augusta says that with the Romans in action several kings of the barbarians retreated, and some of the barbarians put anti-Roman leaders to death. In particular, the Quadi, having lost their king, announced they would not confirm an elected successor without approval from the emperors.

Marcus Aurelius returned to Rome but headed north again in the autumn of 169. He established a Danubian headquarters in Carnuntum between present-day Vienna and Bratislava. From here he could receive embassies from the different peoples north of the Danube. Some were given the possibility to settle in the empire, others were recruited to fight on the Roman side. The Quadi were pacified, and in 171 AD they agreed to leave their coalition, and returned deserters, and 13,000 prisoners of war. They supplied horses and cattle as war contributions, and promised not to allow Marcomanni or Iazyges passage through their territory. By 173 AD the Quadi had rebelled again, and they expelled their Roman-approved king Furtius, replacing him with Ariogaisos. In a major battle between 172 and 174 AD, a Roman force was almost defeated, until a sudden rainstorm allowed them to defeat the Quadi. The incident is well-known because of the account given by Dio Cassius, and on the Column of Marcus Aurelius in Rome. By 175 AD the cavalry of the Marcomanni, Naristae, and Quadi were forced to fight for Rome in the Middle East, and in 176 AD Marcus Aurelius and his son Commodus held a triumph as victors over Germania and Sarmatia.

The situation remained disturbed in subsequent years. The Romans declared a new war in 177 AD and set off in 178 AD, naming the Marcomanni, Hermunduri, Sarmatians, and Quadi as specific enemies. They executed a successful and decisive battle against these enemies in 179 AD at Laugaricio (present-day Trenčín in Slovakia) under the command of legate and procurator Marcus Valerius Maximianus. By 180 AD the Quadi and Marcomanni were in a state of occupation, with Roman garrisons of 20,000 men each permanently stationed in both countries. The Romans even blocked the mountain passes so that the Quadi could not migrate north to live with the Suebian Semnones, breaking a link between the Suebian peoples which had apparently remained important for centuries. Marcus Aurelius was considering the creation of a new imperial province called Marcomannia when he died in 180, but this never happened.

Commodus the son of Marcus Aurelius made peace soon after the death of his father in 180 AD, but he did not go ahead with plans to create a new Roman province. Some Marcomanni were subsequently settled in Italy and other parts of the empire, while others were forced to serve in the military. After these wars the Marcomanni are mentioned much less in written records, and their western neighbours the fate of their previously powerful Suebian neighbours to the west, the Hermunduri and Varisti is unknown.

== Third century Roman crisis and tetrarchy ==
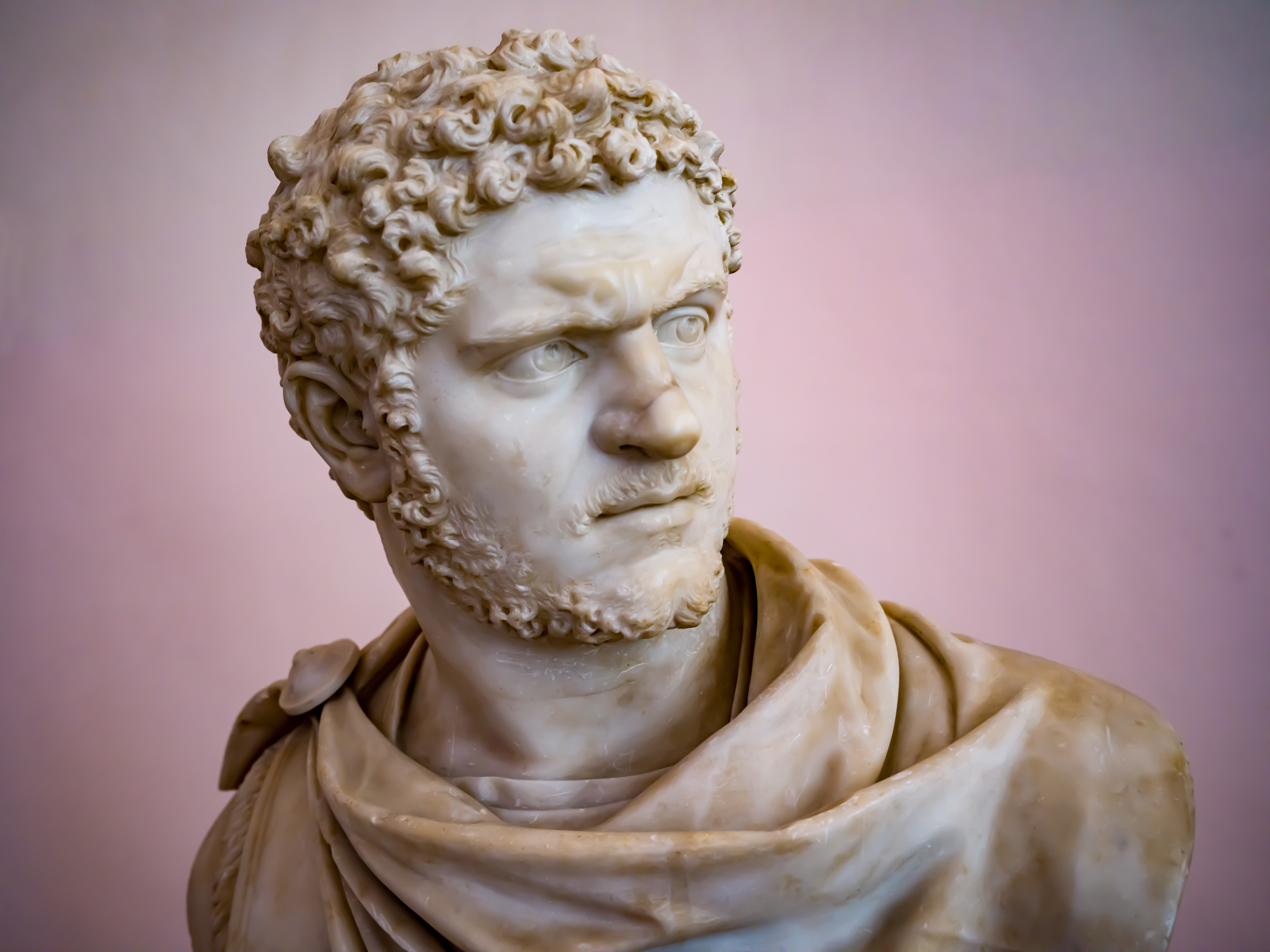
Caracalla: Museo Nazionale Napoli

The long Marcomannic wars in the second century destroyed older power structures on the Danube frontier and created a new situation not only for peoples living on both sides of the border, but also for the larger category of more remote peoples who had been under the influence of the Danubian Suebi and their alliances. Outside the empire, peoples moved, split and merged. New Germanic groups such as the Franks, Saxons, Alemanni, and Goths appeared near the border regions for the first time in the third century, and immediately caused major problems that affected the empire as a whole. Rome lost control of both two large territories north of the Danube, the Agri Decumates between the Upper Danube, Main and Rhine in southern Germany, and Dacia near the Middle and Lower Danube. In the Middle Danubian frontier however, the Marcomanni and Quadi still existed, and were still referred to sometimes as Suebi.

=== Middle Danube, Quadi and Marcomanni ===
After the heavy defeat of the Suebian alliance, the Quadi became the most important Suebi on the Middle Danube. The Hermunduri and Naristi, no longer appear in the written record at all, and there are fewer mentions of the Marcomanni. Some of these populations were settled within the empire. The Quadi subsequently became more integrated with their non-Suebian eastern neighbours the Sarmatians.

Roman treatment of the remaining Danubian Suebi was oppressive. Around 214/215 AD, Dio Cassius reported that because of raids into Pannonia, the emperor Caracalla invited the Quadi king Gaiobomarus to meet him, and then had him executed. According to this report Caracalla "claimed that he had overcome the recklessness, greed, and treachery of the Germans by deceit, since these qualities could not be conquered by force", and he was proud of the "enmity with the Vandili and the Marcomani, who had been friends, and in having executed Gaïobomarus".

Further east the Goths were a new and powerful presence in what is now Ukraine. They began to have a very large impact on the Romans and their neighbours. Although never called Germani in Roman sources, their leadership may have originated among the Gutones, who had been based near the mouth of the Vistula in the first and centuries, and reported by Strabo as one of the non-Suebian peoples under Maroboduus's leadership. If so, then their transformation into a large Scythian people of the eastern plains may have been influenced by the Marcomanni wars and Roman abandonment of Dacia. The 6th century writer Jordanes believed that in this period the Romans were paying off Goths under the rule of Ostrogotha. The Roman emperor Philip the Arab, who reigned 244-249 AD, attempted to cut these payments off, but major raids ensued. He also reported that the Marcomanni were paying tribute to this same Gothic king, and the princes of the Quadi were effectively slaves of the Goths.

During the reign of Valerian (253-260 AD) the later historian Zosimus reported that the Marcomanni made coordinated excursions at the same time as those of the "Scythians", meaning Goths and their allies from the east. These Marcomanni made inroads into all the countries adjacent to the Danube, and laid Thessalonica waste. Valerian's son Gallienus (reigned 253-268 AD) subsequently settled Marcomanni within the Roman province of Pannonia Superior, south of the Danube. He also took Pipa or Pipara, the daughter of the Marcomanni king, Attalus, as a concubine.

By the middle of the third century the Quadi seem to have rejected their client relationship with Rome, and they began a series of attacks which they organized together with their eastern neighbours the Sarmatians. Together they repeatedly attacked Illyricum. There was a Roman campaign against the Quadi in 283-284 AD, and the emperors Carinus (co-emperor 283-285) and Numerian (co-emperor 284-285) celebrated two personal triumphs each in 283 and 284. Nevertheless the Quadi were again mentioned among attacking Germanic tribes in 285 AD.

Although the details are not clear, Diocletian also claimed a triumph over the Marcomanni in 299 AD.

=== Upper Danube, Alemanni and Juthungi ===
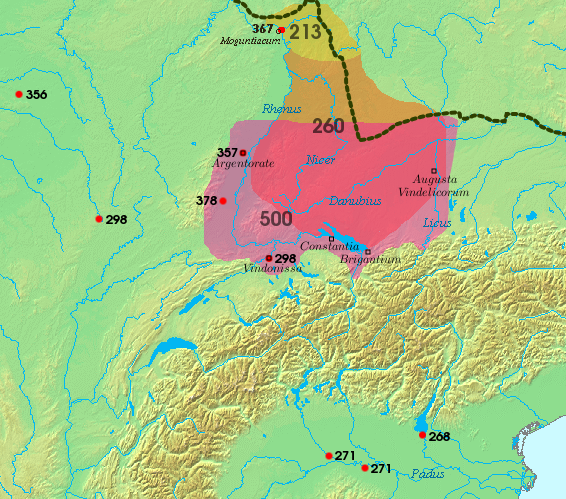
Alemanni expansion and Roman-Alemannic battle sites, 3rd to 5th century

In 213, the emperor Caracalla defeated a group of Germani who lived near the Raetian border on the Danube. Later descriptions of this by Dio Cassius report these Germani to be the people later called the Alamanni. If correct this would be their first appearance in history. They were a large and diverse group containing many smaller groups with their own names and leaders. Although they are never called Suebi in contemporary sources, scholars believe that many of these groups had Suebian origins. Archaeological evidence indicates a steady stream of technological materials arriving from Suebian areas outside the empire, including both the Elbe and Danube regions. During the third century, the Romans gave up control of the Agri Decumates.

In 233 Germani on the Raetian border once again made major inroads across the Danube into the empire, and this led indirectly to the assassination of the emperor Severus Alexander in 235, whose reaction was seen as insufficient. This initiated the 50-year period of Roman weakness and disunity known as the crisis of the third century. The new emperor Maximinus Thrax defeated these Germani and recovered the borders, with great losses. Throughout the century the Rhine and Danube continued to be crossed by Germani, meaning not only the Alamanni, but also the non-Suebian Franks to their north.

Further west, in 260 the Romans recorded a victory over the Juthungi near modern Augsburg, south of the Danube, and a monument created to celebrate this described these Juthungi as Semnones, a Suebian people from the Elbe. In the 4th century, Marcellinus Ammianus described the Juthungi as one of the peoples making up the Alemanni. In the whole region between the Main, Rhine, and Danuberivers, the Alemanni overran the old borders and were threatening new borders – sometimes raiding across them. During the reign of Probus (emperor 276-282), the disrupted situation in the east was also pushing Suebi, as well as Burgundians and Vandals, closer to the Rhine and Danube frontiers where they came into conflict with Roman forces.

From 284 until 305, under Diocletian and his co-emperors, the so-called Tetrarchy, the Romans began to recover control of their border regions. Their successes were celebrated in the Latin Panegyrics which are the first contemporary records which certainly refer to Franks and Alamanni using those terms. The Alamanni are mentioned in the "10th" panegyric of 289, which was dedicated to emperor Maximian. It mentions that in 287 the Alamanni joined forces with the Burgundians in order to invade Gaul. Maximian defeated them by "divine foresight rather than by force": the invaders' "great numbers were ruinous to them", and famine ensued, allowing the emperor to capture them with smaller bands of troops. A few years later the 11th panegyric of 291, also dedicated to Maximian, celebrated the way in which non-Romans were now driven to fight each other. One example it gives is that the Burgundians had been defeated by the Goths, presumably near the Vistula, somehow requiring the Alamanni to take up arms, perhaps as allies, or perhaps because the Burgundians were moving west. It also states that the Burgundians took land from the Alamanni, which the Alamanni now wanted to recover.

In 297/298, Constantius Chlorus, Maximian's son-in-law and subordinate "caesar" in the tetrarchy, devastated the country of "Alamannia", which is the first mention of such a country in any surviving contemporary record. Between 298 and 302 he achieved further major victories against the Alamanni, who had been making inroads into Gaul itself. He defeated them in present-day Langres in France, and then Windisch in Switzerland. The Quadi also seem to have been pacified in the time of Maximian's co-emperor to the east, Diocletian (reigned 284-305).

== Fourth century until 378 ==
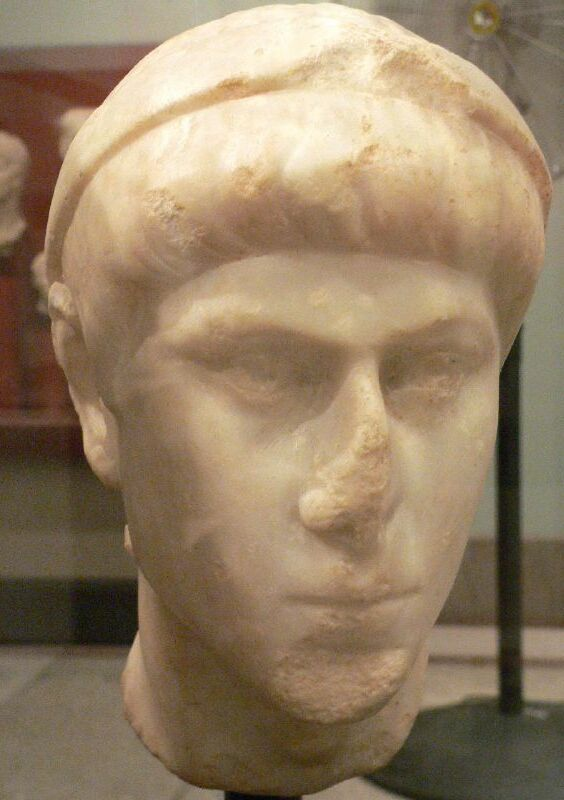
Constantius II

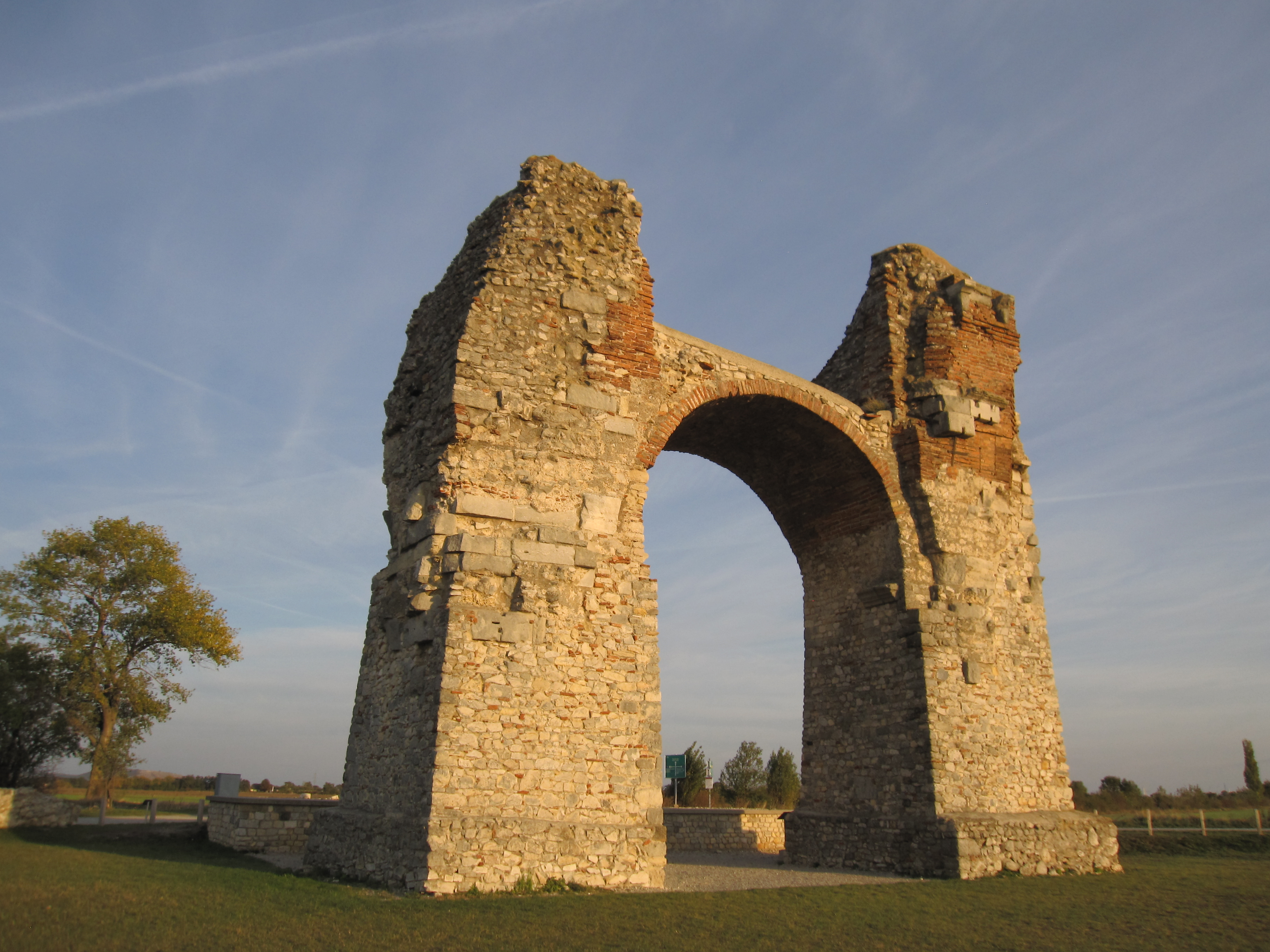
The so-called Heidentor in Carnuntum.

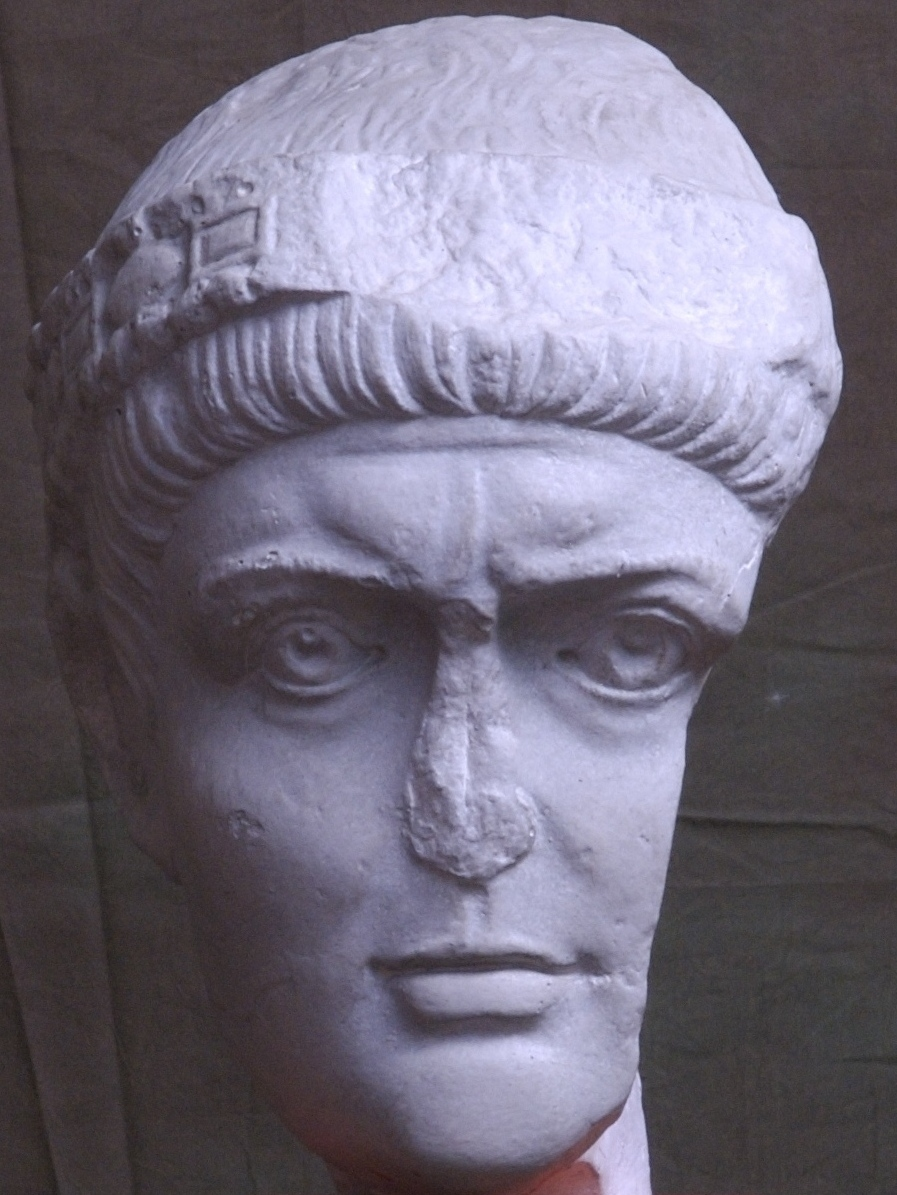
Restored head of Valentinian I

After the resignation of the co-emperors Diocletian and Maximian in 305 AD, and the death of Maximian's replacement as western emperor Constantius Chlorus in 306 AD, Constantine I, the son of Constantius, was proclaimed emperor by his army while based at York in Britain. Among the forces supporting him there were the Alamanni, led by their king Chrocus. Constantine reigned from 306-337 AD, but the empire was then once again divided between his three sons Constantine II, Constantius II and Constans. In 340 Constans killed Constantine II, leaving him with uncontested control in the west.

The Rhine defences were weakened again in 355 when Magnentius became a rebel emperor based there. He killed Constans, and took control of much of the western empire, battling the remaining brother, Constantius II for control of the empire. During his revolt, which lasted until 353, the Rhine borders were undermanned and barbarians were able to enter Gaul while major battles were fought elsewhere. Magnentius finally died in Lyon in 353. Silvanus, one of his main commanders, who had defected to Constantius, was given the task of rebuilding defences in Gaul. However, being accused of plotting to become emperor, he decided to really make an attempt in 355 and was killed soon afterwards.

A new phase of confrontation against the Alemanni in the west and Quadi in the east now began under Constantius II (reigned 337-361). In 354, in the eastern regions of the Alemanni, he defeated the brothers Gundomadus and Vadomarius near Augst, and took the title Germanicus Alama(n)nicus maximus. His cousin, the future emperor Julian the Apostate was given responsibility for Gaul and the Rhine in 355 AD. Germanic peoples including Alamanni had settled within Gaul, and many parts of Gaul were suffering due to reduced cultivation of lands.

In the east in 357 Constantius II also fought the Suebian Quadi. The Quadi and their neighbours the Sarmatians were making raids across the Middle Danube into Roman Pannonia and Moesia on the Lower Danube. The account given by Ammianus Marcellinus shows that in this period the Quadi had become more accustomed to actions on horseback. He reported that the involved Quadi and Sarmatians "were neighbours and had like customs and armour", "better fitted for brigandage than for open warfare, have very long spears and cuirasses made from smooth and polished pieces of horn, fastened like scales to linen shirts". They had "swift and obedient horses" and they generally had more than one, "to the end that an exchange may keep up the strength of their mounts and that their freshness may be renewed by alternate periods of rest".

In 358 the emperor crossed the Danube and resistance quickly fell apart. The leaders who came to negotiate with the emperor represented different parts of the populations who had participated. An important one was prince Araharius, who ruled "a part of the Transiugitani and the Quadi". An inferior of his was Usafer, a prominent noble, who led "some of the Sarmatians". In the negotiations the emperor declared that the Sarmatians were Roman dependents and demanded hostages. He then learned that there had been social upheaval among the Sarmatians, and some of the nobility had even fled to other countries. He gave them a new king, Zizais, a young prince who was the first leader to surrender. He then met with Vitrodorus the son of Viduarius the King of the Quadi. They also gave hostages and they drew their swords "which they venerate as gods" in order to swear loyalty. As a next step he moved to the mouth of the Tisza and slaughtered or enslaved many of the Sarmatians who lived on the other side and had felt themselves protected by the river from the Romans. King Viduarius was probably king of the western Quadi. Constantius erected a triumphal arch in Carnuntium, today known as the Heidentor, but raids did not stop.

By 361, Julian captured a king of the Alamanni named Vadomarius, and claimed that he had been in league with Constantius II, who had been encouraging him to raid the borders of Roman Raetia. Julian defeated his cousin and became sole emperor in the same year. He died only two years later in 363 AD.

Valentinian I (reigned 364-375) appears to have been preparing for campaigns against the Alemanni from an early phase. The Roman usurper Procopius, declared himself emperor in Constantinople with the support of the Alemannic chieftain Agilo. Valentinian's military commander on the Rhine, Charietto, was killed in 366 fighting Alemanni who had penetrated deep into Gaul. Nevertheless the Alemanni were defeated just one month later at Châlons-sur-Marne, and Agilo and another chief named Gomoarius handed over the usurper Procopius to Valens, the younger brother and eastern co-emperor of Valentinian. In 368 other Alemannic chiefs, Vithicabius the son of Vadomarius, and Rando, provoked Valentinian with raids. Vithicabius was assassinated.

Valentinian I built fortifications on the Rhine around 369/370. He also fortified the northern and eastern banks of the Middle Danube against the Quadi and their allies, and by 373 AD he ordered construction of a garrisoned fort within Quadi territory itself. In 374, when complaints from the Quadi delayed construction the Roman general charged with getting it done invited their king Gabinius to dinner and then murdered him. As Ammianus wrote "the Quadi, who had long been quiet, were suddenly aroused to an outbreak". Neighbouring tribes including the Sarmatians sprung into action and began raids across the Danube, repulsing the Roman military's first poorly coordinated attempts to confront them. Valentinian moved to the Danube border and went first to Carnuntum, which was damaged and deserted, and then Aquincum (now part of Budapest). He sent one force north into the Quadi heartlands, and took another force across the Danube near present-day Budapest, where the enemies had settlements, and they slaughtered everyone they could find. He then made his winter quarters on the Roman side of the Danube in Bregetio (present-day Komárom). Here Quadi envoys came to plead for peace. However, when they maintained that the building of a barrier was begun "unjustly and without due occasion", thus arousing rude spirits to anger, Valentinian became enraged, then sick, and died. His death in 375 ended this round of conflict, and the Romans and Quadi were soon preoccupied with bigger problems in the Danubian region.

In 378 Valentinian's eldest son the emperor Gratian was occupied with a campaign against the Alemanni. He and his forces were therefore not present when the empire suffered a major defeat at the Battle of Adrianople, which was caused by a sudden movement of peoples including Goths, Alans and Huns coming from present-day Ukraine, which had been building up for some time. According to Ammianus, the region of the Marcomanni and Quadi were among the areas first affected by the "a savage horde of unknown peoples, driven from their abodes by sudden violence". Armed groups began to settle in or near the Middle Danube, near the Quadi homeland.

== From Adrianople to the Middle Ages ==
The defeat of the Romans at the Battle of Adrianople in 378 marked a turning point for the remaining Suebi on the Middle Danube frontier, including the Quadi and the Marcomanni. The arrival of large numbers of armed Huns, Goths and Alans disrupted the border region on both sides. At first, the Suebi of the Middle Danube who lived outside the empire are recorded as working with the newcomers from the east to raid Roman lands. After the death of emperor Theodosius I in 395, Saint Jerome listed the Marcomanni and Quadi and their old neighbours the Sarmatians and Vandals, together with several of the eastern peoples causing devastation in the Roman provinces stretching from Constantinople to the Julian Alps, including Dalmatia, and all the provinces of Pannonia: "Goths and Sarmatians, Quadi and Alans, Huns and Vandals and Marcomanni". The poet Claudian describes this mass of people crossing the frozen Danube with wagons, and then setting wagons rigged around themselves like a wall at the approach of the Roman commander Stilicho. He says that all the fertile lands between the Black Sea and Adriatic were subsequently like uninhabited deserts, specifically including Dalmatia and Pannonia.

The various peoples living upon the Middle Danube frontier did not remain united. There was conflict between the Alans, Huns and Goths, which led to massacres according to Orosius. The Huns under Uldin began to dominate the region, and they helped the Romans suppress a large force which Radagaisus gathered there to invade Italy in 406. There was also famine according to Isidore of Seville. Large numbers of people from the Middle Danube now headed far to the west, where they entered Roman Gaul during a period when the border was poorly defended. The last contemporary mention of the Quadi as an identifiable people is in another letter by Jerome from 409, but it places them far from home. He lists them first among the peoples who were occupying Gaul at that time: "Quadi, Vandals, Sarmatians, Alans, Gepids, Herules, Saxons, Burgundians, Alemanni and—alas for the commonwealth!—even Pannonians" (in other words Roman citizens from Pannonia). Apart from the Saxons, Burgundians and Alemanni, who were already well-known near the Rhine, the others are from the Middle Danube area.

=== The Kingdom of the Suevi in Hispania ===
Many of the Suebi who came into Gaul around 406, probably including many Quadi, soon moved further west, into Hispania, where a large force of Suebi arrived by 409 AD, about the same time as large groups of Vandals and Alans. Hispania was at this time under the control of the rebel Roman general Gerontius and the newcomers came to agreements with him as military allies in his struggle against Roman forces. The three groups proceeded to divide Hispania between themselves into four kingdoms, with the agreement of Gerontius. After the defeat of Gerontius, the Roman authorities rejected these agreements and the Visigoths began to work against the four kingdoms. After many of the Vandals and Alans moved to Carthage, the Suebi were the last of them to hold an independent kingdom, which endured until 585, when it was absorbed by the Visigothic kingdom. From 456/457 it was however already a vassal of the Visigoths.

=== The Hunnic alternative ===
Some Danubian Suebi remained in the region which increasingly came under the control of the Huns, led at first by Uldin. A powerful Hunnic empire developed, giving the non-Roman peoples of the frontier an alternative way to improve their lives outside the empire. Herwig Wolfram has referred to this as the "Hunnic alternative". Although they may have been present, in 451 none of the Suebian groups are listed by contemporary sources as taking part in the Battle of the Catalaunian Plains, where the Roman allies under Aetius defeated the allies of Attila the Hun.

Attila died in 453. In the ensuing period, a short-lived Suevian kingdom emerged as one of several new kingdoms with ethnic names in Pannonia and the Middle Danubian region. This kingdom was ruled at first by two kings named Hunimund and Alaric. It existed in or near north-eastern Pannonia. It may have been made up of a mixture of Suebian peoples. Modern scholars differ about whether the Quadi or Marcomanni were likely to have been especially prominent. After being defeated by the Ostrogoths, another of the successor kingdoms, Hunimund and some of these Suebi seem to have moved west and joined the Alemanni.

In 469/470 Jordanes reported that Suebi from the Middle Danube fled west into the Alps and joined the Alamanni there. However, their merged forces were defeated by their enemies from the Middle Danube, the Ostrogoths. The country where the Alamanni and Suabi lived is described by Jordanes in a way which gives a rough indication of where the new peoples were developing: Bavarians to the east, Franks to the west, Burgundians to the south, and Thuringians to the north (ab oriente Baibaros habet, ab occidente Francos, a meridie Burgundzones, a septentrione Thuringos). It is believed that this apparent merger of the Danubian Suebi and the Alamanni might explain why the Alamanni subsequently came to be called Swabians themselves in the Middle Ages.

=== The Alemanni and Juthungi ===
In the period before 409, although they already lived near the Rhine, the Alemanni, like their neighbours the Burgundians, were caught up in the great movements westwards over the Rhine. It appears to be in this period that the Alemanni and Burgundians extended their territories westwards over the Rhine to include the present day Rhineland-Palatinate and Alsace. The exact territory of the Burgundians at this time is unknown, and they lost it in 436. By around 480 the Burgundians were placed to the south of the Alemanni and able to block their path south into present-day western Switzerland.

To the west of the Alemanni, in 430 the Juthungi raided Raetia on the Danube, and were repelled by Aetius and his forces. This is the last time the Juthungi were mentioned as a distinct people. The Baiuvarii (early Bavarians) would later rule Raetia.

In 470-476, a few years after Jordanes claims that Suebi from the east moved to live with the Alemanni, Saint Severinus, near Passau, negotiated the release of prisoners of war from an Alemannic king named Gibuldus. At almost the same time, Bishop Lupus of Troyes negotiated the release of captives from his diocese of Troyes from an Alemannic king Gebavultus, possibly the same person.

In the 490s one or more battles were fought between the Alemanni and the Franks. By 507 many of the Alemanni were under Frankish control, with another part under the protection of the Ostrogothic kings in Italy. In 537 the Ostrogoths ceded control of the rest of the Alemanni and also Raetia where the Bavarians were.

=== Roman Pannonia ===
Other Middle Danubian Suebi moved southwards into Roman lands, including many Marcomanni. Ambrose, bishop of Milan (374–397), corresponded with a Christian Marcomannic queen named Fritigil, initiating a peace treaty between the Marcomanni and the western Roman military leader Stilicho. That was the last clear evidence of the Marcomanni having a polity, which was probably now on the Roman side of the Danube, in Pannonia. The Notitia Dignitatum lists several Marcomanni units among the surviving Roman military forces posted around the empire. After the death of Attila, the stretch of the Danube between Passau and Vienna was ruled by the Rugii, but there were still Roman forts and towns, as described by Eugippius in his writings about the times of Severinus of Noricum. Soon afterwards, in 488, these Rugii were defeated by Odoacer the king of Italy and after some years under the control of the Heruli, the Langobards, a Suebian who had recently migrated from the northern part of the Elbe, took control of the region and began expanding their Pannonian territory to the south.

The Ravenna Cosmography, a much later document which used sources that are in many cases now lost, indicates that a Marcannori people (Marcannorum gens) lived in the mountainous southwest of Pannonia near the Sava river. A Sava or Suavia province between the Sava and Drava rivers continued to exist during the time when the Ostrogoths ruled Italy, and may have been named after these Suebi (Suavi). The date and circumstances of the Suebian settlement in this more southerly region are uncertain. Lotter associated a substantial movement of Suebi from northern Pannonia into the Sava region with the power vacuum created after the departure of the Valamir Ostrogoths around 471/472, and identified these settlers mainly as Marcomanni-Suebi. Castritius, however, considered this date too late and suggested that substantial Suebian settlement in the Sava region may already have taken place during Hunnic rule or shortly after the collapse of Hunnic power after 453.

During the Ostrogothic period, these Suebi were legally distinguished from the native populations under the term "old barbarians" (antiqui barbari), which also distinguished them from the new arrivals, the Goths. Unusually, they were legally permitted to marry provincial residents and could therefore become part of the land-owning class. Some scholars believe these were descendants of the Christian Marcomanni of Queen Fritigil. During the time of Theoderic the Great a group of Alemanni crossed the Alps with cattle and wagons to seek refuge with these antiqui barbari. Procopius noted that in 537 the Ostrogoths recruited an army of these Suebi to launch an attack against areas held by the Eastern Roman empire. In 540 Ostrogothic rule in the Sava region came to an end, and the Suebi came under the authority of the Eastern Roman emperor Justinian. Many of the Suebi who remained in the Pannonian region are believed to have taken up a Lombardic identity after the defeat of the Ostrogoths, and many may therefore have subsequently entered Italy with the Suebian Lombards. The region subsequently came under the control of the Pannonian Avars, and it is probably during this period that Slavic languages eventually became dominant in the areas where the Quadi had lived.

=== Integration into the Lombards ===
Many Suebi from the Danubian region were assimilated into the Langobards (Lombards), who had themselves long ago been counted among the Suebian peoples in first and second century Roman ethnography. In the 6th century, the Langobards were no longer referred to as Suebi, but they apparently absorbed Suebi during their time in the Middle Danubian, including some from the southern Suavian part of Pannonia. When the Lombards entered Italy after 568, Suebi were among the groups who joined them, and formed part of their realm in Italy.

According to Lotter, an important stage in this process occurred around 526/527, shortly after the death of Theoderic the Great, when the Lombard king Wacho crossed the Danube and brought the Suebi of Upper Pannonia under his rule.

=== Suebi who remained in the north ===
Despite all these changes, there are indications that at least one group of Suebi, the so-called "northern Suebi", seem to have survived near their Elbe homelands into the Middle Ages.

- The Frankish king Theudebert I (534–547) wrote to the Byzantine emperor Justinian boasting that at the start of his reign in 534 the Frankish kingdom extended "from the Danube and the frontiers of Pannonia to the northern Ocean". The subjects peoples living north of the Danube were listed as the Thuringians, North Swabians (Norsavi), Saxons, and the Eucii, who were perhaps identical with the Jutes.
- Venantius Fortunatus named Suebi alongside Frisians.
- The Old English Widsith mentions Swaefe located in what is now Schleswig-Holstein.
- Widukind of Corvey mentioned the Suavi Transbadani.
- Later, 10th–11th century evidence records a “Schwabengau” north of the Harz regions, though the origin of this name cannot be securely explained.
- The “North Suebi” are also mentioned in the Annals of Metz.

=== The Bavarians ===
Between the Alemanni and the Langobards, in what had been Roman Raetia, a new people named the Baiuvarii appeared by the 6th century, and these were the forerunners of the medieval Bavarians. Although they were never referred to as Suebi, modern scholars often mention them among the "Elbe Germanic peoples" who supposedly carried a Suebian culture. While their origins are unclear, scholars believe their language and material culture was difficult to distinguish from the Alemanni or Langobards. Jordanes mentioned the Baiuvarii in his account of 5th century events, but the relatively detailed biography of Severinus of Noricum describes the region around Passau being affected by Alemanni, Thuringians, and Rugii, and never mentions the Baiuvarii. They became important soon after the defeat of the Rugii by Odoacer in 488, who was at that time the ruler of Roman Italy. To the east of the early Baiuvarii, the power vacuum created by the subsequent movements of armed peoples to Italy was filled the Suebian Langobards who had moved southwards from the Elbe in this period. Raetia however remained relatively Romanized for some time, and Bavaria continued to have Romance speakers into the Middle Ages.

Traditionally, discussion about the origins of the Baiuvarii starts with their name, which indicates a connection to one of the regions once inhabited by the Boii. It implies that some of the early Bavarians moved from one or more of the regions to the east of Bavaria. This could include the Roman province of Noricum, which was previously associated with the Marcomanni and their neighbours, and later with Hunnic allies such as the Rugii.

Like the Swabians in Alamannia, in the Middle Ages Bavaria became a stem duchy in the Holy Roman Empire.

== Norse mythology ==
The name of the Suebi also appears in Norse mythology and in early Scandinavian sources. The earliest attestation is the Proto-Norse name Swabaharjaz ("Suebian warrior") on the Rö runestone and in the place name Svogerslev. Sváfa, whose name means "Suebian", was a Valkyrie who appears in the eddic poem Helgakviða Hjörvarðssonar. The kingdom Sváfaland also appears in this poem and in the Þiðrekssaga.

== See also ==
- Swabia
- Dukes of Swabia family tree
- Germanic personal names in Galicia
- Laeti
