= Irminones =

Group of early Germanic tribes

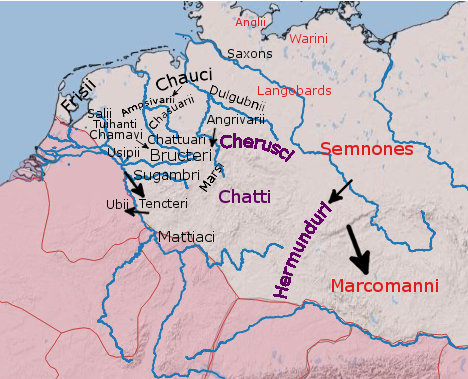
The approximate positions of some Germanic peoples reported by Graeco-Roman authors, Suevian peoples in red, and other Irminones in purple

The Irminones, also referred to as Herminones or Hermiones (Ancient Greek: Ἑρμίονες), were a large group of early Germanic tribes who lived in the Elbe watershed during the first century AD, and expanded into Bavaria, Swabia, and Bohemia. This included the large sub-group of the Suevi, that itself contained many different tribal groups, but the Irminones also included for example the Chatti.

The term Irminonic therefore is also used as a term for Elbe Germanic, which is one of the proposed (but unattested) dialect groups ancestral to the West Germanic language family, especially the High German languages, which include modern Standard German.

== History of use ==
=== Classical ===
The name Irminones or Hermiones comes from three classical sources.

The oldest is Pomponius Mela. In his Description of the World (III.3.31) he described the Hermiones as the farthest people of Germania, beyond both the Cimbri and Teutones who lived on the Codanus sinus, which is understood today to have been his name for the Baltic Sea and Kattegat, although it was described by him as a very large bay filled with islands, east of the Elbe river. Still farther east Mela describes the Sarmatians whom he places west of the Vistula, and then the Scythians whom he places east of the Vistula.

Secondly, Pliny in his Natural History (4.100) described the Hermiones as an inland group of Germani, and included the Suebi, Hermunduri, Chatti, and Cherusci.

Tacitus's Germania writing in about 100 AD categorized the Herminones as one of the tribes that some people say were descended from Mannus, and noted that they lived in the interior of Germania. Other Germanic groups of tribes were the Ingvaeones, living on the coast, and Istvaeones, who accounted for the rest. Tacitus also mentioned the Suebi as a large grouping who included the Semnones, the Quadi, and the Marcomanni, but he did not say precisely to which (if any) of the three nations they belonged.

=== Medieval ===
In the so-called Frankish Table of Nations (c. 520), probably a Byzantine creation, the son of Mannus, who was the ancestor of the Irminones, is named Erminus (or Armen, Ermenius, Ermenus, Armenon, Ermeno, as it appears in various manuscripts). He is said to have fathered the Ostrogoths, Visigoths, Vandals, Gepids, and Saxons. In a variation on the table that appears in the Historia Brittonum, the Vandals and Saxons have been replaced by the Burgundians and Langobards.

They may have differentiated into the tribes Alamanni, Hermunduri, Marcomanni, Quadi, and Suebi by the first century AD. By that time the Suebi, Marcomanni, and Quadi had moved southwest into the area of modern-day Bavaria and Swabia. In 8 BC, the Marcomanni and Quadi drove the Boii out of Bohemia.

The term Suebi is usually applied to all the groups who moved into this area, although later in history (around 200 AD) the term Alamanni (meaning "all-men") became more commonly applied to the group.

Jǫrmunr, the Viking Age Norse form of the name Irmin, can be found in a number of places in the Poetic Edda as a by-name for Odin. Some aspects of the Irminones culture and beliefs may be inferred from their relationships with the Roman Empire, from Widukind's confusion over whether Irmin was comparable to Mars or Hermes, and from Snorri Sturluson's allusions, at the beginning of the Prose Edda, to Odin's cult having appeared first in Germany before spreading up into the Ingvaeonic North.
