= Galloway =

Region in southwestern Scotland

Coordinates: 55°03′N 4°08′W

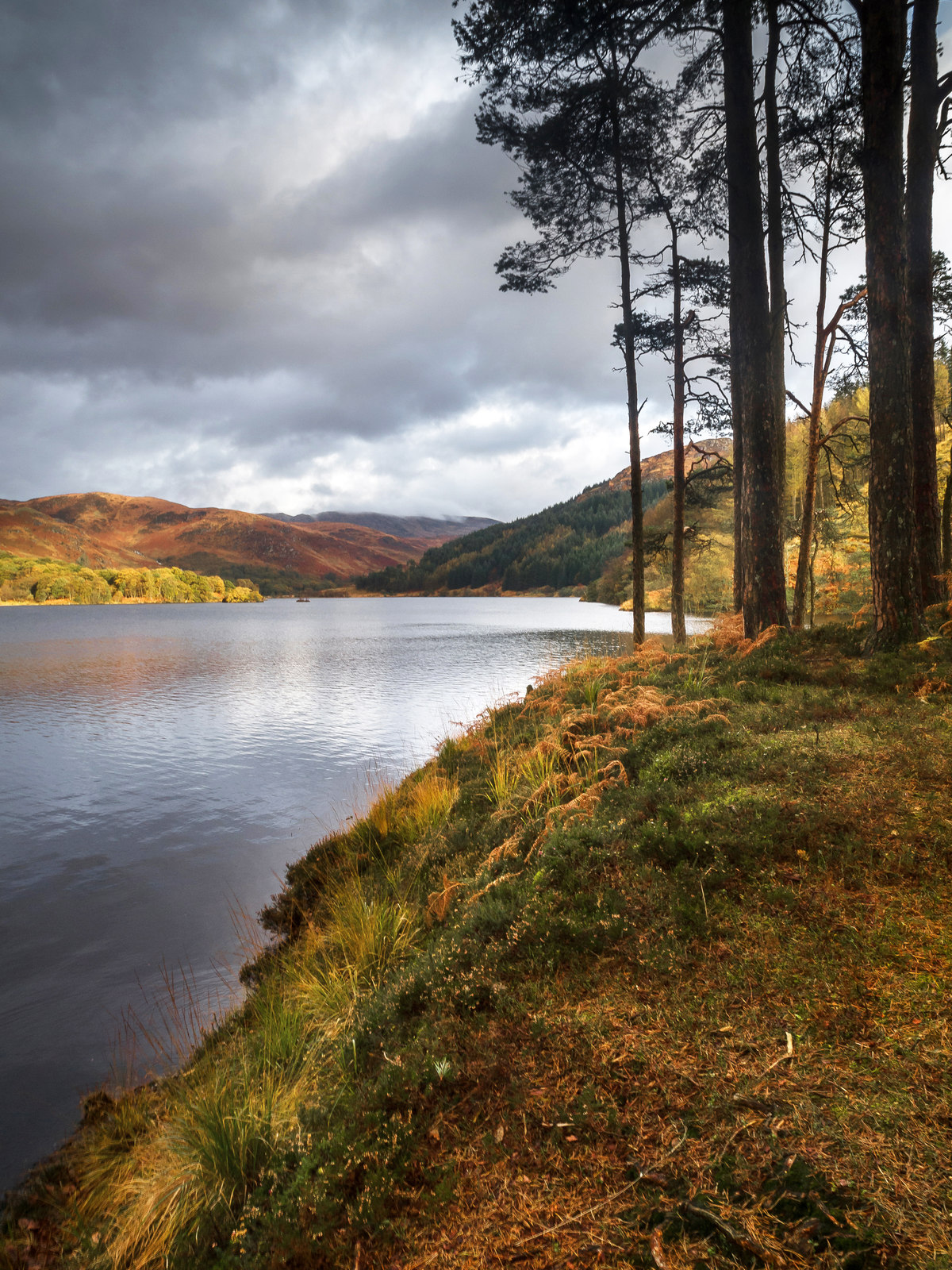
- Loch Trool, Galloway Forest Park

- Galloway (red) shown in Scotland (sand white) shown in the United Kingdom (light grey)
- Demonym: Gallovidian

Galloway (Scottish Gaelic: Gall-Ghàidhealaibh [ˈkal̪ˠaɣəl̪ˠu]; Scots: Gallowa; Latin: Gallovidia) is a region in southwestern Scotland comprising the historic counties of Wigtownshire and Kirkcudbrightshire. It is administered as part of the council area of Dumfries and Galloway.

Galloway is bounded by sea to the west and south, the Galloway Hills to the north, and the River Nith to the east; the border between Kirkcudbrightshire and Wigtownshire is marked by the River Cree. The definition has, however, fluctuated greatly in size over history.

A native or inhabitant of Galloway is called a Gallovidian. The region takes its name from the Gall-Gàidheil, or "stranger Gaels", a people of mixed Gaelic and Norse descent who seem to have settled here in the 10th century. Galloway remained a Gàidhealtachd area for much longer than other regions of the Scottish Lowlands and a distinct local dialect of the Scottish Gaelic language survived into at least the 18th century.

A hardy breed of black, hornless cattle named Galloway cattle is native to the region, in addition to the more distinctive Belted Galloway or "Beltie".

== Geography and landforms ==
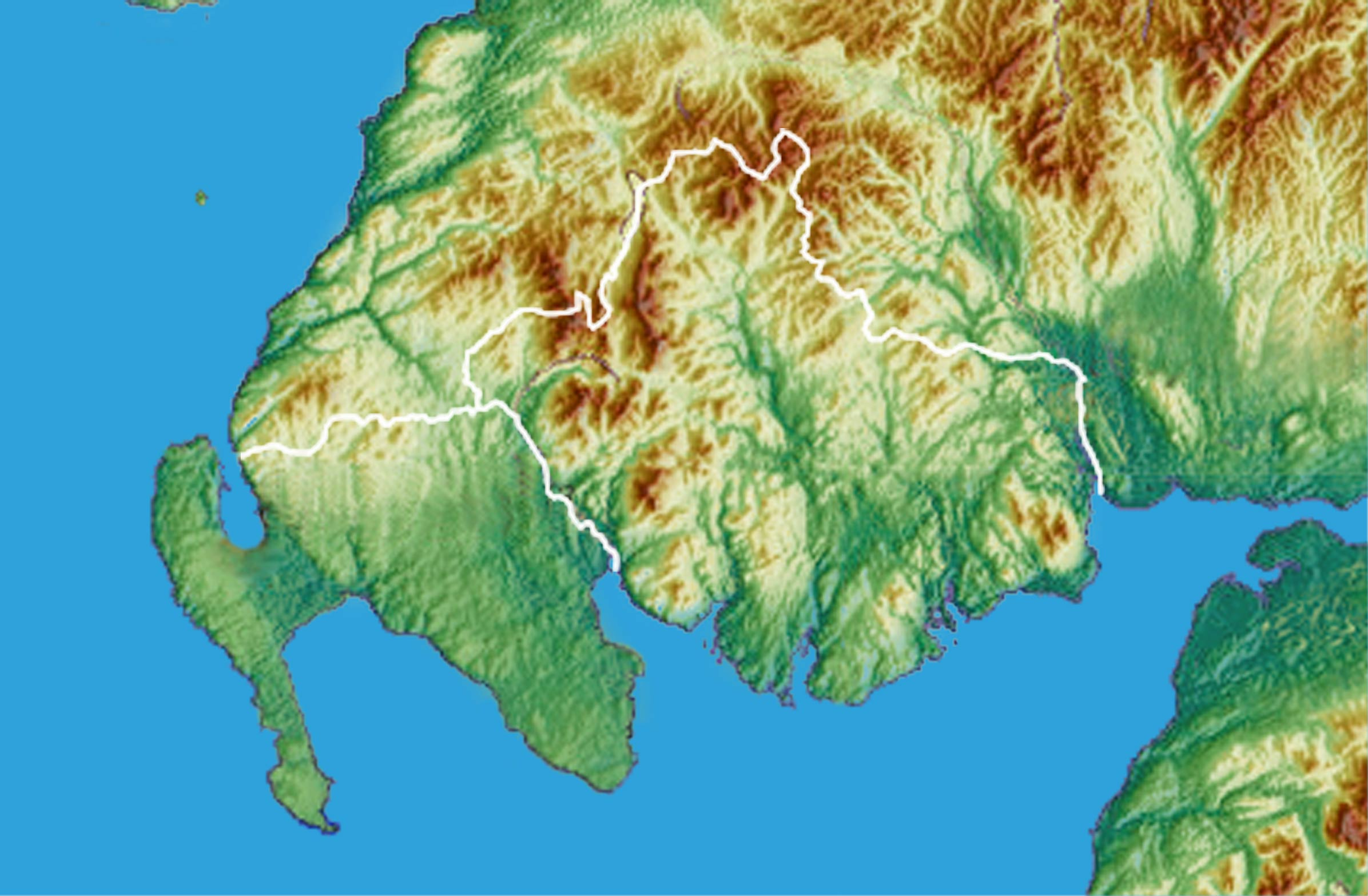
Topographic map of southwestern Scotland

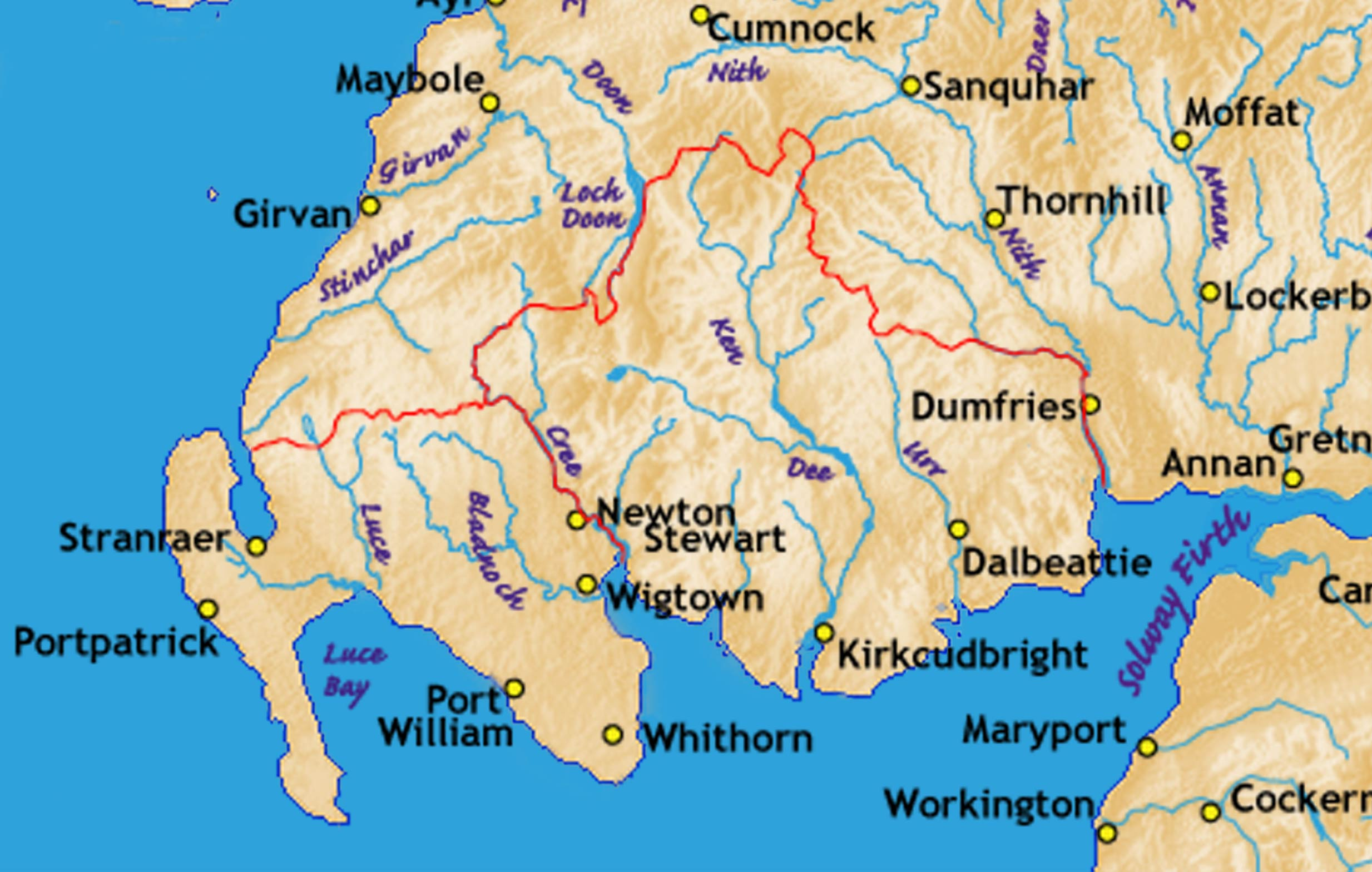
The main rivers and several towns

Galloway comprises the part of Scotland lying southwards from the Southern Upland watershed and westward from the River Nith. Traditionally it has been described as stretching from "the braes of Glenapp to the Nith". The valleys of three rivers, the Urr Water, the Water of Ken and River Dee, and the Cree, all running north–south, provide much of the good arable land, although there is also some arable land on the coast. Generally however the landscape is rugged and much of the soil is shallow. The generally south slope and southern coast make for mild and wet climate, and there is a great deal of good pasture.

The northern part of Galloway is exceedingly rugged and forms the largest remaining wilderness in Britain south of the Highlands. This area is known as the Galloway Hills.

== Land use ==
Historically Galloway has been known both for horses and for cattle rearing, and milk and beef production are both still major industries. There is also substantial timber production and some fisheries. The combination of hills and high rainfall make Galloway ideal for hydroelectric power production, and the Galloway Hydro Power scheme was begun in 1929. Since then, electricity generation has been a significant industry. More recently wind turbines have been installed at a number of locations on the watershed, and a large offshore wind-power plant is planned, increasing Galloway's 'green energy' production.

== History ==
=== Mesolithic and Neolithic ===
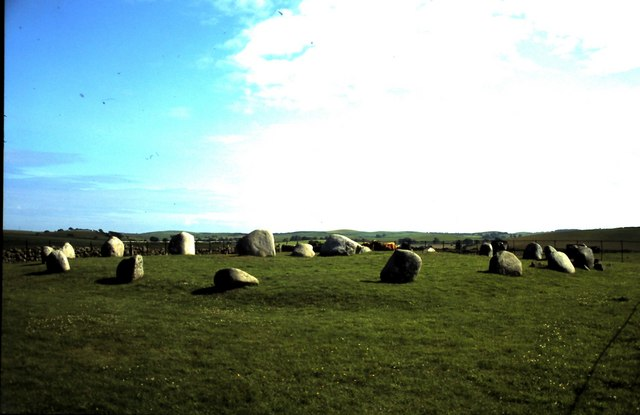
Torhousekie stone circle

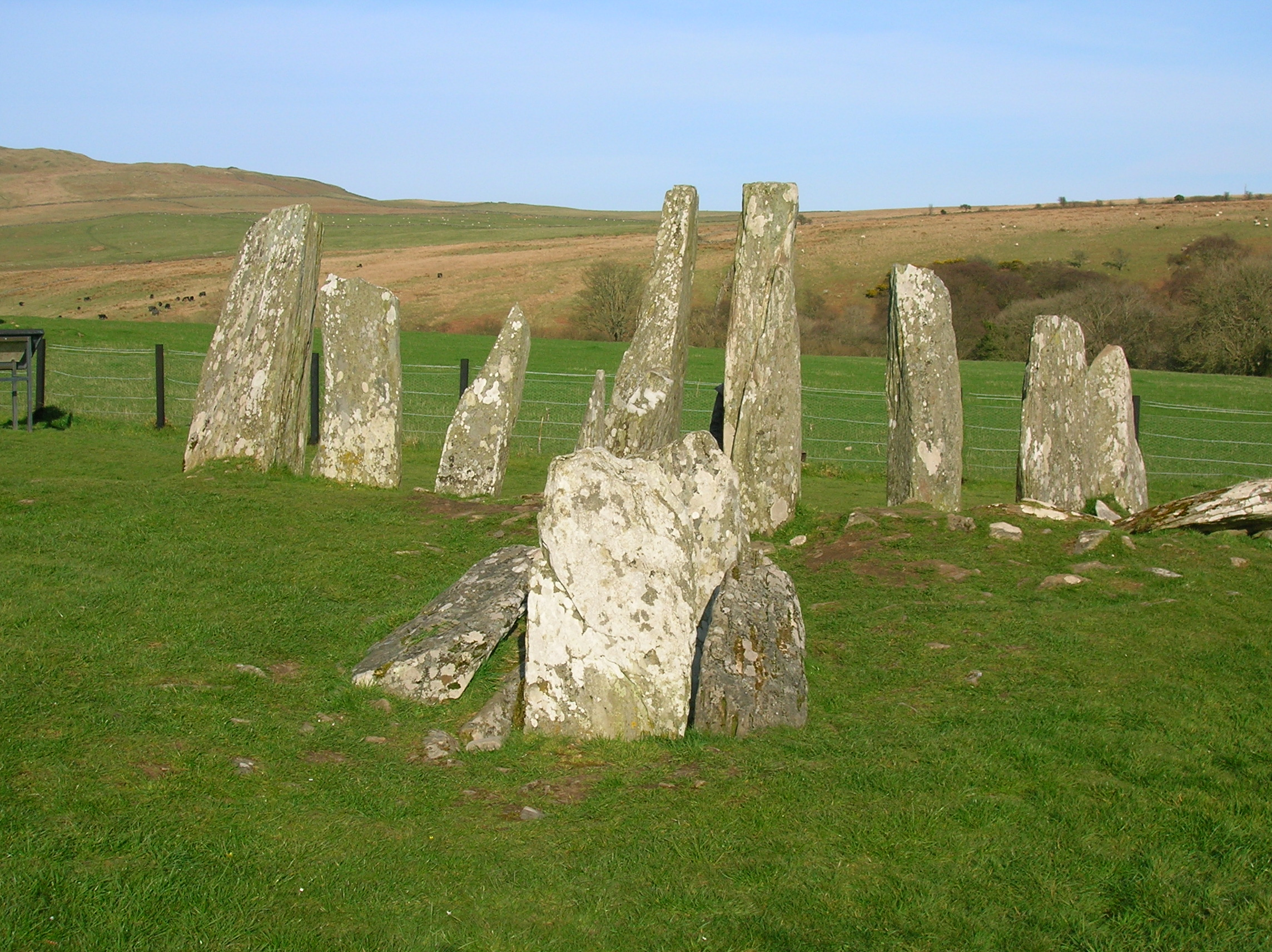
Cairnholy chambered cairn.

It is thought that aspects of the Barsalloch Fort site in Galloway date to the Mesolithic period. A number of sites date to the Neolithic; these include the Drumtroddan standing stones, the Torhousekie stone circle, and the Cairnholy chambered cairn. There is also evidence of one of the earliest pit-fall traps in Europe which was discovered near Glenluce, Wigtownshire.

=== Iron Age ===
The Iron Age is where prehistoric archaeological remains and recorded history overlap for Galloway. Galloway's Iron Age sites are similar to the rest of Scotland. Its distinctive type sites consist of crannogs, promontory forts, and duns.

Galloway has a preponderance of crannog-type sites compared to certain other regions of Scotland. This is due largely to the region's geography favouring lochs (or now-former lochs), as well as a bias toward higher survival rates of undisturbed sites available for archaeological investigation due to loch-draining taking place later in Galloway than in other regions, with the discovery of such sites eliciting antiquarian interest. For example, the Black Loch of Myrton site (which likely dates to around the 5th century BC) was discovered due to loch-draining activities in the area of the Maxwell family estate during the 19th century. The site received the attention of a local antiquarian, Sir Herbert Maxwell, who conducted a basic excavation. Initially thought to be a crannog, the Black Loch of Myrton site was later recharacterized as a "lochside village".

Promontory forts are highly topographically defined sites, which in Galloway generally occupy coastal promontories overlooking the Solway Firth. Investigation of one such site at Carghidown revealed a "sporadically occupied refuge" according to Toolis, who also notes that "hardly any promontory forts occupy strongly defensive locations or have immediate access to the sea." While many surviving sites represent sporadically occupied locations or individual households, there are also examples of multiple-household settlements. One of these is the Rispain Camp site near Whithorn, which contained a form of bread wheat unique amongst Iron Age sites in Galloway. This is a possible indication that Rispain Camp had different agricultural practices than elsewhere in Galloway, especially given the relatively low occurrence of rotary querns at sites in the area. Roughly contemporary with the Rispain Camp site, a cluster of roundhouses at Dunragit (dating to the early centuries AD) was revealed to contain examples of native (i.e. non-Roman) pottery.

Certain households in Galloway seem to have taken social prominence later in the Iron Age. Lead items appear; isotope analysis of goods at a number of Iron Age and Roman period sites indicate the Scottish Southern Uplands as a possible ore source for the lead material, though it is unclear how early extraction of lead could have taken place in Galloway specifically. Metallurgical testing done on three lead beads recovered from the Carghidown site (dated to c. 360 BC–AD 60) indicated a closer affinity to the Southern Uplands than to a sample from the Isle of Man. The area around Whithorn, containing both the Carghidown and Rispain Camp sites, appears to have become a local power centre. The Carghidown site is located only a short distance to the east along the coast from St Ninian's Cave, while the Rispain Camp site is several miles inland.

Following the start of the Roman conquest of Britain, the Roman general Gnaeus Julius Agricola campaigned northward, reaching Scotland around AD 79. A possible comment about "trackless wastes" may have referred to Galloway, but this is unclear. The source of this comment is the version of Tacitus' Agricola which is contained in the Codex Aesinas. The Codex Aesinas is a composite work produced in the 15th century, which is based on a now-lost 9th century work, the Codex Hersfeldensis, which contained portions of the Agricola. The interpretation of "trackless wastes" is based on material thought to derive from the 9th century codex, with an original Latin in avia primum transgressus ("first crossing into the trackless wastes") having been corrupted into annonave prima transgressus, which is grammatically incorrect in Latin. The interpretation that this passage refers to Galloway is based on contextual information, as the work later refers to "the part of Britain that faces Ireland", which is seen as referring to southwestern Scotland.

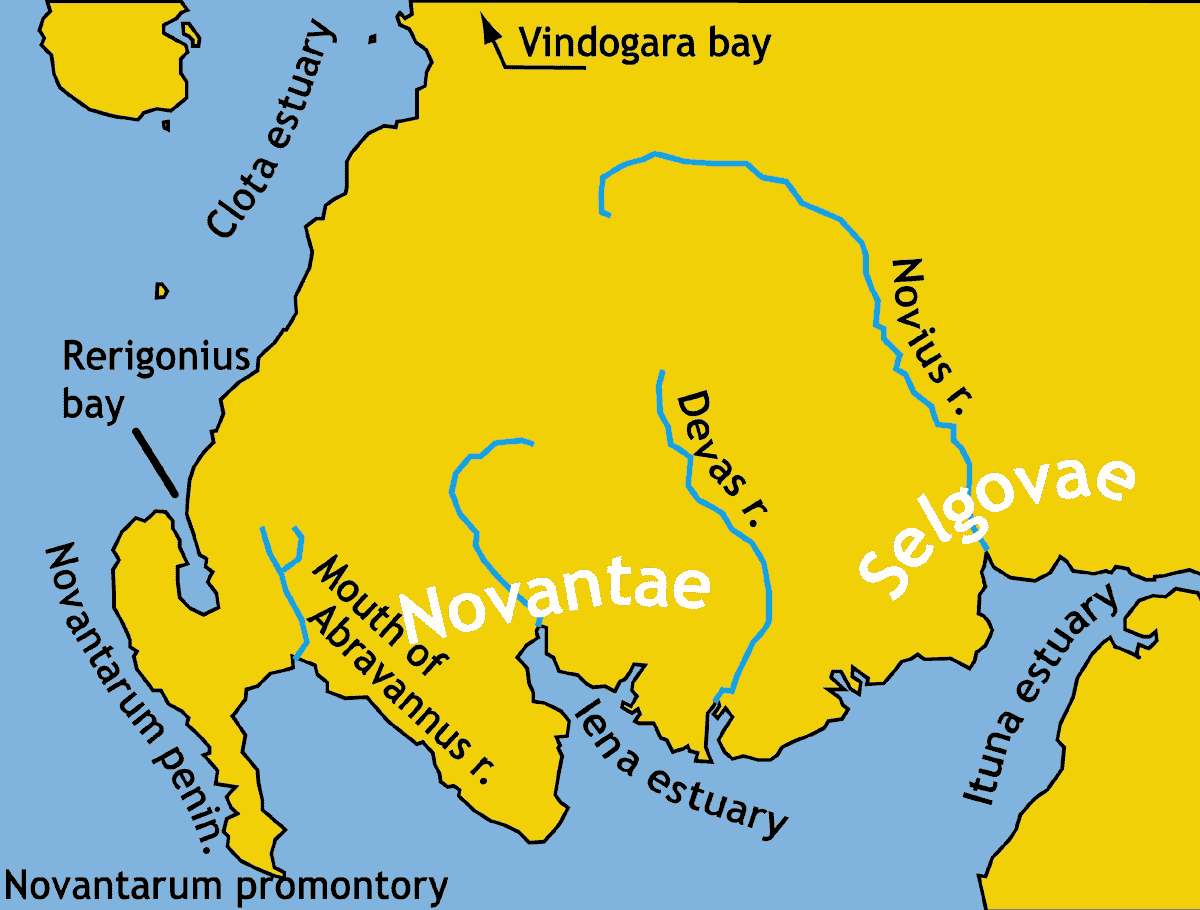
Landmarks according to Ptolemy.

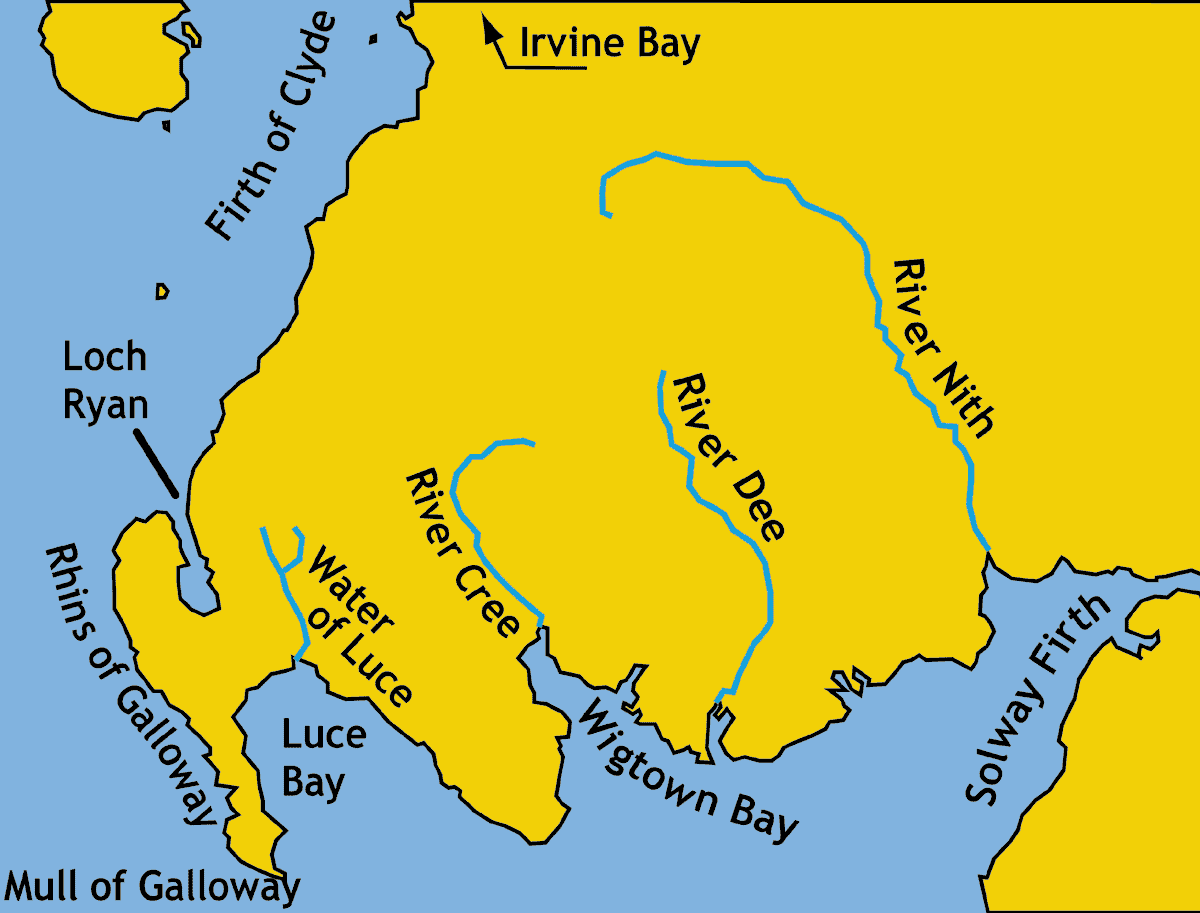
Galloway: modern names of landmarks on Ptolemy's map.

In the 2nd century, the Alexandrian geographer Ptolemy produced his Geographia, which was written c. AD 150. This work included Britain. No surviving copies of the Geographia exist which are older than the 13th century, creating the possibility that details may have been lost or distorted. Ptolemy credited much of his work to a now-lost atlas by Marinus of Tyre, a previous geographer whose work is thought to have been created around AD 114. Though it would have been written within the century after Agricola's campaign, Ptolemy's work is a Roman perspective on Britain following the conquest, and not necessarily a reflection of pre-Roman social or ethnic groups. Ptolemy listed two peoples as inhabitants of the area around Galloway: the Novantae in the west (associated with Wigtownshire, Kirkcudbrightshire, and southern Ayrshire) and the Selgovae in the east (primarily associated with modern-day Dumfriesshire). It is thought that the Iron Age inhabitants of the Barsalloch Fort site were the Novantae people. The Rispain Camp site is also associated with the Novantae.

In the west, the city of Rerigonium (literally 'very royal place'), shown on Ptolemy's map of the world, is a strong contender for the site of Pen Rhionydd, referred to in the Welsh Triads as one of the 'three thrones of Britain' associated with the legendary King Arthur, and may also have been the caput of the sub-Roman Brythonic kingdom of Rheged. Rerigonium's exact position is uncertain except that it was 'on Loch Ryan', close to modern day Stranraer; it is possible that it is the modern settlement of Dunragit (Dun Rheged).

According to tradition, before the end of Roman rule in Britain, St. Ninian established a church or monastery at Whithorn, Wigtownshire, which remained an important place of pilgrimage until the Reformation.

=== Middle Ages ===
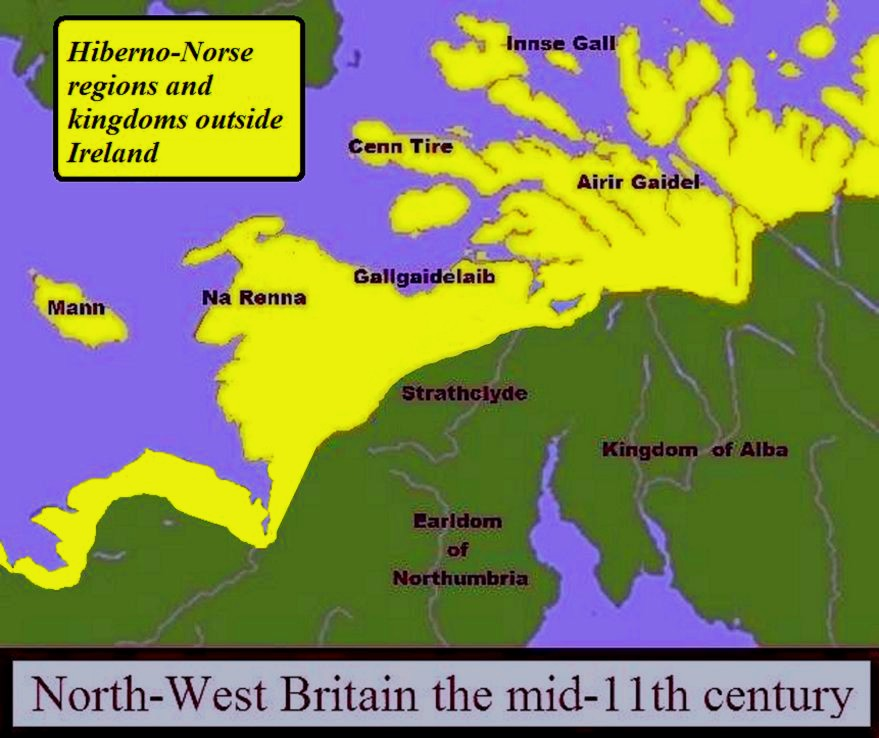
11th century

A Brythonic speaking kingdom dominated Galloway until the late 7th century when it was absorbed by the English kingdom of Bernicia.

English prevalence was supplanted by Britons and Norse-Gaelic (Gall-Ghàidheal) peoples between the 9th and the 11th century. This can be seen in the context of both the vacuum left by Northumbria being filled by the resurgent Cumbric Britons and the influx of the Norse into the Irish Sea, including settlement in the Isle of Man and in the now English region of western Cumbria immediately south of Galloway.

In 2014, a Viking hoard containing around 100 objects dating from the 9th or 10th century was discovered in Galloway. The hoard included objects from across Europe and from other cultures, providing evidence of the region's connections with the wider Viking world.

If it had not been for Fergus of Galloway who established himself in Galloway in the mid-twelfth century, the region would rapidly have been absorbed by Scotland. This did not happen because Fergus, his sons, grandsons and great-grandson Alan, Lord of Galloway, shifted their allegiance between Scottish and English kings. During a period of Scottish allegiance, a Galloway contingent followed David, King of Scots, in his invasion of England and led the attack in his defeat at the Battle of the Standard (1138).

Alan died in 1234, leaving three daughters and an illegitimate son, Thomas (Tomás mac Ailein). Alexander II of Scotland, Galloway's suzerain, planned to divide Galloway between Alan's three daughters and their husbands (all Norman noblemen) and to exclude Thomas under Norman feudal law. However, Thomas considered himself Alan's heir under the Gaelic system of tanistry. In the ensuing Galloway revolt of 1234–1235, an army of Galwegian rebels ambushed Alexander's royal army and nearly inflicted a defeat before relief forces arrived to support the king. The rebels retreated to Ireland, and Alexander left Walter Comyn, Lord of Badenoch to subdue Galloway; Comyn sacked its abbeys before fleeing when faced with the return of the rebels. The rebellion was eventually ended with the return of royal forces. The result was a partition of Galloway, serving to fragment it administratively, though some ecclesiastical (the bishopric) and judicial (the office of Justiciar of Galloway) offices survived further into the High Medieval period and beyond.

Alan's eldest daughter, Derbhorgail (Latinized as Dervorguilla), married John de Balliol, and their son (also John) became one of the candidates for the Scottish Crown. Consequently, Scotland's Wars of Independence were disproportionately fought in Galloway.

There were a large number of new Gaelic placenames being coined post 1320 (e.g. Balmaclellan), because Galloway retained a substantial Gaelic speaking population for several centuries more. Following the Wars of Independence, Galloway became the fief of Archibald the Grim, Earl of Douglas. In 1369, he received the part of Galloway east of the River Cree, where he appointed a steward to administer the area, which became known as the Stewartry of Kirkcudbright. The following year, he acquired the part of Galloway west of the Cree, which continued to be administered by the king's sheriff, and so became known as the Shire of Wigtown. The two parts of Galloway thereafter were administered separately, becoming separate counties.

The High Medieval period saw a gradual incorporation of Galloway into Scotland. Scotland's legal system was administered as a system of three provinces, each with a justiciar (high official). The Justiciar of Galloway was one of these, along with justiciars for Lothian and "Scotia" (lands north of the Forth and Clyde). Additionally, Whithorn remained an important cultural centre; medieval kings of Scots made pilgrimages there.

=== Reformation and Covenanters ===
Folklore holds that a copy of the Wycliffe Bible was circulating in Galloway around 1520, and secret groups (proto-conventicles) gathered to hear a man named Alexander Gordon preach from it. With the end of the monasteries, the large ecclesiastical landholdings created under the medieval Lordship of Galloway were broken up amongst hundreds of small landowners. In the case of Dundrennan Abbey, much of the abbey's lands came into the hands of the family of its last abbot, Edward Maxwell. Following the death of the pre-Reformation Bishop of Galloway in 1575, there were disputes over who would be bishop, and the see was vacant for a considerable period of time in the late 16th century due to opposition to episcopal polity by the Presbyterian faction within the Church of Scotland.

The Anglo-Scottish Union of the Crowns took place in 1603, leading to the supremacy of the Stuart dynasty in Britain and Ireland. James, the Stuart monarch of both Scotland and England, heavily policed the activities of the riding clans of the nearby Scottish Borders, leading to a large number of Borderers emigrating or being transported to Ireland or to the American colonies. The Plantation of Ulster began around this time.

Attempts beginning under James VI to enforce Caesaropapism, episcopal polity, high church Anglicanism, and Laudianism within the Church of Scotland, ultimately triggered the Presbyterian backlash of the 17th-century Bishops' Wars, which saw the appearance of the Covenanters as a religious, political, and military force. The Covenanters began as participants in conventicles, which, similarly to the use of Mass stones by the equally illegal Catholic Church in Scotland, were unsanctioned secret religious services that took place outdoors, in barns, or in granaries. The Covenanter movement was particularly popular in the southwest of Scotland. Covenanters had skirmishes with government troops in Galloway, some of which featured the "Galloway flail", a variant of the agriculturally-derived melee weapon.

=== Cattle trade ===
Galloway's agricultural economy was indirectly affected by the 17th-century Plantation of Ulster. Peasants in Galloway had, dating back to the Middle Ages, traditionally practiced a mixture of dairy-focused pastoral transhumance and intensive agriculture, with pockets of arable land being intensively cultivated by some peasants, while others migrated between upland and lowland pastures with their herds. Landowners such as Sir John Murray, the earl of Annandale, received large land grants in Ulster which were only suitable for pasture. In order for their tenants in Ireland to pay rent, an export market had to be created, which was soon sanctioned by the Scottish Privy Council, for Irish cattle to be exported to England via Galloway. Some landowners used the cattle trade in the 17th century as a way to grow their landholdings, as the system of a large number of small landholders began to consolidate into larger estates. The Irish cattle trade increased until up to 10,000 head of cattle per year were being exported through this route in the year 1667. It was in this year that the importation of Irish cattle to England was banned. However, the importation of Scottish cattle was not banned; this created a new opportunity for Galloway landowners to profit from illicit Irish cattle. By this time, a number of prominent individuals associated with the Stuart monarchy held lands in both Galloway and in Ulster, facilitating the illicit trade, which "may have been tolerated for political reasons". Many of these landowners were also Episcopalians.

Galwegian Gaelic seems to have lasted longer than Gaelic in other parts of Lowland Scotland, and Margaret McMurray (d. 1760) of Carrick (outside modern Galloway) appears to have been the last recorded speaker.

=== Modern history ===
In modern times, Stranraer was a major ferry port for Stena Line, but the company have now moved to Cairnryan.

== Galloway in literature ==
Galloway has been the setting of a number of novels, including Walter Scott's Guy Mannering. Other novels include the historical fiction trilogy by Liz Curtis Higgs, Thorn in My Heart, Fair is the Rose, and Whence Came a Prince. Richard Hannay flees London to lie low in Galloway in John Buchan's novel The Thirty-nine Steps. Five Red Herrings, a whodunit by Dorothy L. Sayers, initially published in the US as Suspicious Characters, sees Lord Peter Wimsey, on holiday in Kirkcudbright, investigating the death of an artist living at Gatehouse of Fleet; the book contains some remarkable descriptions of the countryside. S R Crockett, a bestselling writer of historical romances active before the First World War, set several novels in the region including The Raiders and Silver Sand.

Galloway is also the setting of several memoirs, including Devorgilla Days written by Wigtownshire author Kathleen Hart, an account of life in Wigtown, Scotland's national book town.

With regard to Scottish Gaelic literature, the only text known to survive in Galwegian Gaelic is a song called Òran Bagraidh, which was collected from a North Uist seanchaidh by Celticist Donald MacRury.

In Canadian literature, poet and playwright Watson Kirkconnell's visit to his ancestral village in the region inspired his original poem "Kirkconnell, Galloway, A.D. 600. Visited A.D. 1953". The poet pondered how much the culture of the region and the celebration of Christmas Day had changed since Kirkconnell Abbey was founded by St. Conal, a Culdee monk from Gaelic Ireland and missionary of the Celtic Church. The landscape, he commented, remained largely unchanged and called upon his readers to embrace the awe that their ancestors had once felt before the incarnation and birth of Jesus Christ.

== See also ==
- Galloway Association of Glasgow
- Galloway pony
