= Nuithones =

Germanic people

The Nuithones were one of the Nerthus-worshipping Germanic tribes mentioned by Tacitus in Germania. Schütte remarks that the name is probably corrupt and suggests that the correct forms were Teutones or Euthiones (Jutes).

(Original Latin) "Reudigni deinde et Aviones et Anglii et Varini et Eudoses et Suardones et Nuithones fluminibus aut silvis muniuntur. Nec quicquam notabile in singulis, nisi quod in commune Nerthum, id est Terram matrem, colunt eamque intervenire rebus hominum, invehi populis arbitrantur. ..." --Tacitus, Germania, 40.

(English translation) "There follow in order the Reudignians, and Aviones, and Angles, and Varinians, and Eudoses, and Suardones and Nuithones; all defended by rivers or forests. Nor in one of these nations does aught remarkable occur, only that they universally join in the worship of Herthum (Nerthus); that is to say, the Mother Earth."--Tacitus, Germania, 40, translated 1877 by Church and Brodribb.

== See also ==
- List of ancient Germanic peoples
