= Warini =

A Germanic people

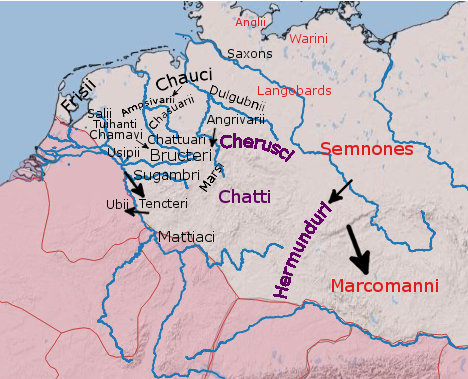
The approximate positions of some Germanic peoples reported by Graeco-Roman authors in the 1st century. Suevian peoples in red, and other Irminones in purple.

The Warini, Warni or Varni were one or more Germanic peoples who originally lived in what is now northern Germany, near the Baltic Sea and North Sea. In Old English they were apparently called Wærnas.

They were first mentioned by two Roman authors in the first century AD, one of whom specified that they lived east of the lower Elbe near the Baltic sea. Much later, a people with the same name were mentioned in the same area. The sixth-century Byzantine historian Procopius described them living in a large area that stretched from the area south of Denmark in the east to the Rhine delta in the west, and as far north as the ocean. The historian Matthias Springer believes the name was probably being used at this time to refer to groups who could also be referred to as Thuringians in this period, and also groups who would later be called Continental Saxons.

== Name and etymology ==
In the first century Tacitus spelled the name as Varini, and Pliny the Elder called them the Varinnae.

Whether Ptolemy referred to them is doubted, but he mentions three different peoples who may have reflected reports of the Varini: the Wiruni (Ούίρουνοι), Avarpi (Αὔαρποι), and the Abarini or Avarini (spelling variants Ἀβαρινοί, Αὐαρινοί).

In fifth and sixth century Greek and Latin sources such as Procopius and Jordanes they are normally called the Warni (Ancient Greek: Οὐάρνοι, Latin: Varni).

Later possible attestations include Wærne or Werne mentioned in the Old English Widsith, and Uuerini in the title given to one manuscript of the Lex Thuringorum.

The name supposedly meant either "defenders" or "living by the river" (from the Indo-European root *uer- "water, rain, river").

=== Similar names ===
The name of the Warni has been associated with several geographical names in Germany. However, placenames such as Uueringeuue, Werenfelt, and Hwerenofeld are believed to derive instead from the name of the rivers Wern and Querne, or the personal name Werinario (Werner). Springer also considers proposals that there is a connection to the Danish placename Varnæs to be untenable.

The name of the West Slavic tribe called the Warnabi has also been associated with the Warni.

== First century ==
The earliest mention of this tribe appears in Pliny the Elder's Natural History (published about 77 AD). He wrote that there were five Germanic races, and one of these were the Vandili (probably precursors of the Vandals). These included the Burgodiones, the Varinnae, the Charini (not known from any other record) and the Gutones (probably precursors of the Goths).

Tacitus (about AD 56 – 120) gave more information about the early Varini in his Germania. In contrast to Pliny he mentioned them as one of a group of remote Germani, living close to the "Ocean" (apparently the Baltic Sea), beyond the Semnones and Langobardi who lived near the Elbe. He did not mention that they were Vandili, but apparently considered them and their neighbouring tribes to be Suebian peoples, united by a particular cult which stretched to remote regions.

(English translation)	(Original Latin)
"Next come the Reudigni, the Aviones, the Anglii, the Varini, the Eudoses, the Suardones, and Nuithones who are fenced in by rivers or forests.	"Reudigni deinde et Aviones et Anglii et Varini et Eudoses et Suarines et [2] Nuitones fluminibus aut silvis muniuntur.
None of these tribes have any noteworthy feature, except their common worship of Ertha [the Latin says Nerthus], or mother-Earth, and their belief that she interposes in human affairs, and visits the nations in her car.	nec quicquam notabile in singulis, nisi quod in commune Nerthum, id est Terram matrem, colunt eamque intervenire rebus hominum, invehi populis arbitrantur.
In an island of the ocean there is a sacred grove, and within it a consecrated chariot, covered over with a garment. Only one priest is permitted to touch it.	est in insula Oceani castum nemus, dicatumque in eo vehiculum, veste contectum; [3] attingere uni sacerdoti concessum.
He can perceive the presence of the goddess in this sacred recess, and walks by her side with the utmost reverence as she is drawn along by heifers.	is adesse penetrali deam intellegit vectamque bubus feminis multa cum veneratione prosequitur.
It is a season of rejoicing, and festivity reigns wherever she deigns to go and be received.	laeti tunc dies, festa loca, quaecumque [4] adventu hospitioque dignatur.
They do not go to battle or wear arms; every weapon is under lock; peace and quiet are known and welcomed only at these times, till the goddess, weary of human intercourse, is at length restored by the same priest to her temple.	non bella ineunt, non arma sumunt; clausum omne ferrum; pax et quies tunc tantum nota, tunc tantum amata, donec idem sacerdos satiatam [5] conversatione mortalium deam templo reddat.
Afterwards the car, the vestments, and, if you like to believe it, the divinity herself, are purified in a secret lake. Slaves perform the rite, who are instantly swallowed up by its waters.	mox vehiculum et vestis et, si credere velis, numen ipsum secreto lacu abluitur. servi ministrant, quos statim idem lacus haurit.
Hence arises a mysterious terror and a pious ignorance concerning the nature of that which is seen only by men doomed to die.	arcanus hinc terror sanctaque ignorantia, quid sit illud quod tantum perituri vident.
This branch indeed of the Suevi stretches into the remoter regions of Germany."	Et haec quidem pars Sueborum in secretiora Germaniae porrigitur"

== Ptolemy ==
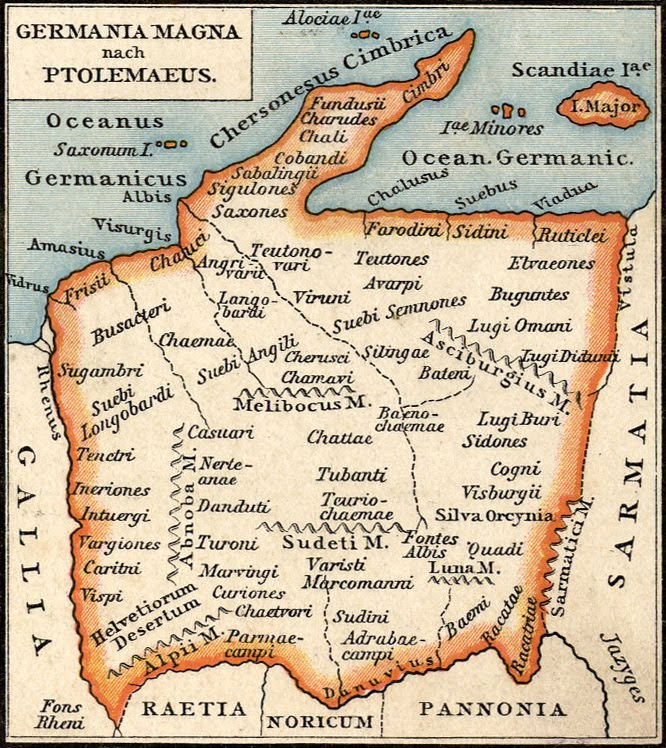
A map of Germania based upon the work of Ptolemy

Surviving versions of the second century Geography by Ptolemy do not definitely mention the Warni in any of the normal spelling forms, but there several candidates which scholars have considered.

Two of these candidates are described as neighbours living north of the Semnones. Ptolemy described them as living in an inland region stretching from the Elbe river to the "Suevus", which is probably the Oder river. In the region to their north Ptolemy described a river called the "Chalusos", possibly the Warnow, which empties into the Baltic between the Danish peninsula and the Suevus.

- To the west of the Chalusos lived the "Wiruni" (Ancient Greek: Ούίρουνοι) and the "Teutonoari". North of them live the Axones or Saxones (depending on the manuscript).
- To the east of the Chalusos lived the "Avarpi" (Ancient Greek: Αὔαρποι) and the "Teutones". North of them on the Baltic coast are the otherwise-unknown Farodini.

Gudmund Schütte suggested that the name of the Teutonoari was an error combining the Teutones and the Warni (Ouarni).

This description by Ptolemy is generally seen as consistent with the position of the Varini in Tacitus. The name of the Warnow river itself has sometimes been associated with the Warni.

Secondly, Ptolemy also plotted the position of a town named Virunum (Οὐιρουνον) at 40°30' longitude and 55° latitude using his system. This is however east of the Chalusus and Suevus rivers according to him.

Thirdly, and still further east past the Vistula and therefore in what he considered to be Sarmatia, Ptolemy mentions the Avarini or Abarini near the source of the Vistula river. At least one scholar, Ernst Schwarz, considered these to be Warini who had moved from the region near Jutland.

== Late antiquity ==
In 456-457, after the defeat of the Kingdom of the Suebi in northwest Iberia by the Visigoths, the Suebi were ruled for a while by Aioulf (or Agriwulf) who had been fighting for the Goths. Jordanes, the 6th-century historian of the Goths, describes him as being of Varni descent, using the Latin term stirpe to describe the Varni, implying that they were a clan or dynasty.

In the period 493-507 Theoderic the Great wrote a letter which is preserved in the Variae of Cassiodorus, addressed to the kings of the Warni (Guarni), Heruli and Thuringians. He urges them to join him in support of the Visigothic kingdom of Alaric II, who was under attack from the lawless aggression of Clovis I, which threatened all of them. He reminded the three kings that Alaric's father Euric (reigned 466-484) had once supported them, but he does not give details about how. Clovis conquered the Visigoths of Alaric II in 507 at the Battle of Vouillé.

The "Warni" (Ouárnoi) were also mentioned by Procopius in the 6th century, implying that they inhabited a very large territory in his time, which he describes as stretching from somewhere north of the Danube, to a border on the river Rhine, which separated them from the Franks and other Germanic peoples of the Rhine. Their territory also stretched to the ocean coast, somewhere on the North Sea. This has led to suggestions by some scholars that the Warni in this period encompassed the Thuringians. Scholars have also noted that Procopius surprisingly never refers to the Saxons at all, either in Britain or on the continent, despite being a well-informed and high ranking official, describing relatively recent events. As eastern neighbours of the Franks he also does mention the Thuringians when discussing the early Franks, before the Franks conquered them. This has been interpreted by some scholars as meaning that the Warni had been part of a large Thuringian empire, and that after the conquest of the main Thuringian kingdom by the Franks in 531, and before the Frankish victory over the Warni in 594, that the Warni and Thuringians outside Frankish control were not distinguished. Lanting and van der Plicht argued that Procopius was simply using the term Warni to refer to any of the old Germanic peoples of the Rhine who had not become Franks, and lived across the Rhine, outside the old Roman empire. According to them the Warni who Procopius describes living near the Rhine could for example have included the descendants of the Frisii and Chamavi.

In a passage concerning the period around 535, Procopius mentions that a claimant to the throne of the Lombards sought shelter with the Warni, but King Wacho bribed them to murder him, whereupon his surviving child fled to the Slavs.

In another passage concerning the events in the 540s, Procopius implied that the Warni country stretched to the east far enough to border upon land of the Danes to the north, with a barren land to their south separating them from Slavic lands north of the Danube. He described a group of Heruli who travelled from the Belgrade area to Scandinavia (which he called Thule) by crossing the Danube (Ister), travelling through lands of the Slavs (Sclaveni), and then a barren region, then the land of the Warni, and after these Warni they passed through the land of the Danes, before crossing the sea from there to Scandinavia.

According to the longest digression of Procopius about the Warni, the Warnian king Hermegisclus made a strategic alliance with the Frankish ruler Theudebert I (ruler Austrasia 533-547), marrying his sister Theudechild. However, in contrast he had engaged his son with the sister of the Anglian ruler. Before his death he expressed the wish to have his son married to his stepmother Theudechild instead. As a result when king Hermegisclus died, the Warni compelled his son Radigis to marry his stepmother. The maiden, who is not named in the story, did not accept this, and crossed the North Sea with an army of 400 ships and 100,000 men, seeking retaliation. After a battle won by the Anglians, Radigis was caught hiding in a wood not far from the mouth of the Rhine and had no other choice than to marry his fiancée.

In 552/3, the historian Agathias mentioned an outstanding warrior named Waccar of the Warni (Ouakkáros Ouárnos), whose son Theudebald, together with his Warni force, joined the Eastern Roman forces in Italy who were fighting the Ostrogoths under the command of Narses.

According to the chronicle of Fredegar the Varni or Warni rebelled against the Merovingian Franks in 594 and were bloodily defeated by Childebert II in 595 (the year he died) "so that few of them survived".

In the 8th century sources such as Bede and the Ravenna Cosmography use the term "Old Saxony" to refer to the apparent continental homeland of the British Saxons, and the Warini are no longer mentioned. The Cosmography ued older materials and describes the lands of the Saxons as lying on the Ocean coast between Frisia and the Danes. It also borders on Thuringia and contains the rivers "Lamizon", "Ipada", "Lippa" and "Limac" (generally interpreted as the Ems, Pader, Lippe and Leine).

== The Thuringian law code ==
The "Werini" also appear in the title of a 9th-century legal codex, Lex Angliorum et Uuerinorum hoc est Thuringorum (Law of the Angles and Werini, that is, of the Thuringians), which is one of several law codes assigned in this period to different parts of the Frankish Carolingian Empire.

The original title of the law code is not known, but some scholars argue that this title is consistent with the idea that there had been a Thuringian empire, which dominated Northern Germany from Attila's death in 453 until the 530s when they were conquered by the Franks. If this proposal of a large empire is correct then it would be understandable that people could be called both Thuringian and Warnian.

== Mention in the Old English Widsith ==
The Warini are mentioned in the Anglo-Saxon poem Widsith as the Wærne or Werne.

lines 24–27:
Þeodric weold Froncum, þyle Rondingum,	Theodric ruled the Franks, Thyle the Rondings,
Breoca Brondingum, Billing Wernum.	Breoca the Brondings, Billing the Werns.
Oswine weold Eowum ond Ytum Gefwulf,	Oswine ruled the Eow and Gefwulf the Jutes,
Fin Folcwalding Fresna cynne.	Finn Folcwalding the Frisian-kin.

The name Billing, mentioned in Widsith, might be related to the ancestors of the Saxon Billung-family.

== See also ==
- List of Germanic peoples
- Värend, possible Warnic homeland

== Sources ==
- Grahn-Hoek, Heike (2009), "Das Recht der Thüringer und die Frage ihrer ethnischen Identität. Mit einer Bemerkung zur Entstehung von Begriff und Institution ‚Adel'", in Castritius, Helmut; Geuenich, Dieter; Werner, Matthias (eds.), Die Frühzeit der Thüringer. Archäologie, Sprache, Geschichte, Reallexikon der Germanischen Altertumskunde - Ergänzungsbände, vol. 63, De Gruyter, pp. 415–456, ISBN 978-3-11-021454-3
- Jarnut, Jörg (2009), "Thüringer und Langobarden im 6. und beginnenden 7. Jahrhundert", in Castritius, Helmut; Geuenich, Dieter; Werner, Matthias (eds.), Die Frühzeit der Thüringer. Archäologie, Sprache, Geschichte, Reallexikon der Germanischen Altertumskunde - Ergänzungsbände, vol. 63, De Gruyter, pp. 279–290, ISBN 978-3-11-021454-3
- Kälble, Mathias (2009), "Ethnogenese und Herzogtum Thüringen im Frankenreich (6.–9. Jahrhundert)", in Castritius, Helmut; Geuenich, Dieter; Werner, Matthias (eds.), Die Frühzeit der Thüringer. Archäologie, Sprache, Geschichte, Reallexikon der Germanischen Altertumskunde - Ergänzungsbände, vol. 63, De Gruyter, pp. 329–413, ISBN 978-3-11-021454-3
- Lanting; van der Plicht (2010), "De ^{14}C-chronologie van de Nederlandse Pre- en Protohistorie VI: Romeinse tijd en Merovingische periode, deel A: historische bronnen en chronologische schema's", Palaeohistoria, vol. 51/52, p. 62, ISBN 978-90-77922-73-6
- Springer, Matthias (2004). Die Sachsen (in German). Kohlhammer Verlag. ISBN 978-3-17-023227-3.
- Springer, Matthias (2006), "Warnen", in Beck, Heinrich; Geuenich, Dieter; Steuer, Heiko (eds.), Reallexikon der Germanischen Altertumskunde, vol. 33 (2 ed.), de Gruyter, pp. 274–281, ISBN 978-3-11-018388-7
