= Reudigni =

Ancient Germanic tribe

The Reudigni were one of the Nerthus-worshipping Germanic tribes mentioned by Tacitus in Germania. Schütte suggests that the name should be read Rendingi or Randingi and then the name would be the same as the Rondings of Widsith. They have otherwise been lost to history, but they may have lived in Denmark prior to the arrival of the Danes recorded by Jordanes. Schütte suggests that their name lives on in the names Randers and Randers Fjord, Denmark.

(Original Latin) "Reudigni deinde et Aviones et Anglii et Varini et Eudoses et Suardones et Nuithones fluminibus aut silvis muniuntur. Nec quicquam notabile in singulis, nisi quod in commune Nerthum, id est Terram matrem, colunt eamque intervenire rebus hominum, invehi populis arbitrantur. ..." --Tacitus, Germania, 40.

(English translation) "There follow in order the Reudignians, and Aviones, and Angles, and Varinians, and Eudoses, and Suardones and Nuithones; all defended by rivers or forests. Nor in one of these nations does aught remarkable occur, only that they universally join in the worship of Herthum (Nerthus); that is to say, the Mother Earth."--Tacitus, Germania, 40, translated 1877 by Church and Brodribb.

== See also ==
- List of Germanic peoples
