= Suarines =

Ancient Germanic tribe

The Suarines or Suardones were one of the Nerthus-worshipping Germanic tribes mentioned by Tacitus in Germania. They have otherwise been lost to history, but Schütte suggests that their name lives on in the name of the town Schwerin.

== Literary attestation ==
=== Tacitus ===
Tacitus mentions them amongst a group of tribes defended by rivers and forests, that worshipped Nerthus:

(Original Latin) "Reudigni deinde et Aviones et Anglii et Varini et Eudoses et Suardones et Nuithones fluminibus aut silvis muniuntur. Nec quicquam notabile in singulis, nisi quod in commune Nerthum, id est Terram matrem, colunt eamque intervenire rebus hominum, invehi populis arbitrantur. ..." --Tacitus, Germania, 40.

(English translation) "There follow in order the Reudignians, and Aviones, and Angles, and Varinians, and Eudoses, and Suardones and Nuithones; all defended by rivers or forests. Nor in one of these nations does aught remarkable occur, only that they universally join in the worship of Herthum (Nerthus); that is to say, the Mother Earth."--Tacitus, Germania, 40, translated 1877 by Church and Brodribb.

=== Widsith ===
Neidorf suggests that the tribal name ”sweordwerum” in line 61 of Widsith might be a corrupted form of this name.

== Modern theories ==
According to some Italian scholars, there is trace of this tribe in a modern Lombard surname (Suardi) as well in the surname Lusuardi. Both surnames belong to the same genetic family - Haplogroup U152 Z36.

== See also ==
- List of Germanic peoples
