= Marco da Montegallo =

Italian Roman Catholic priest

Blessed Marco da Montegallo OFM
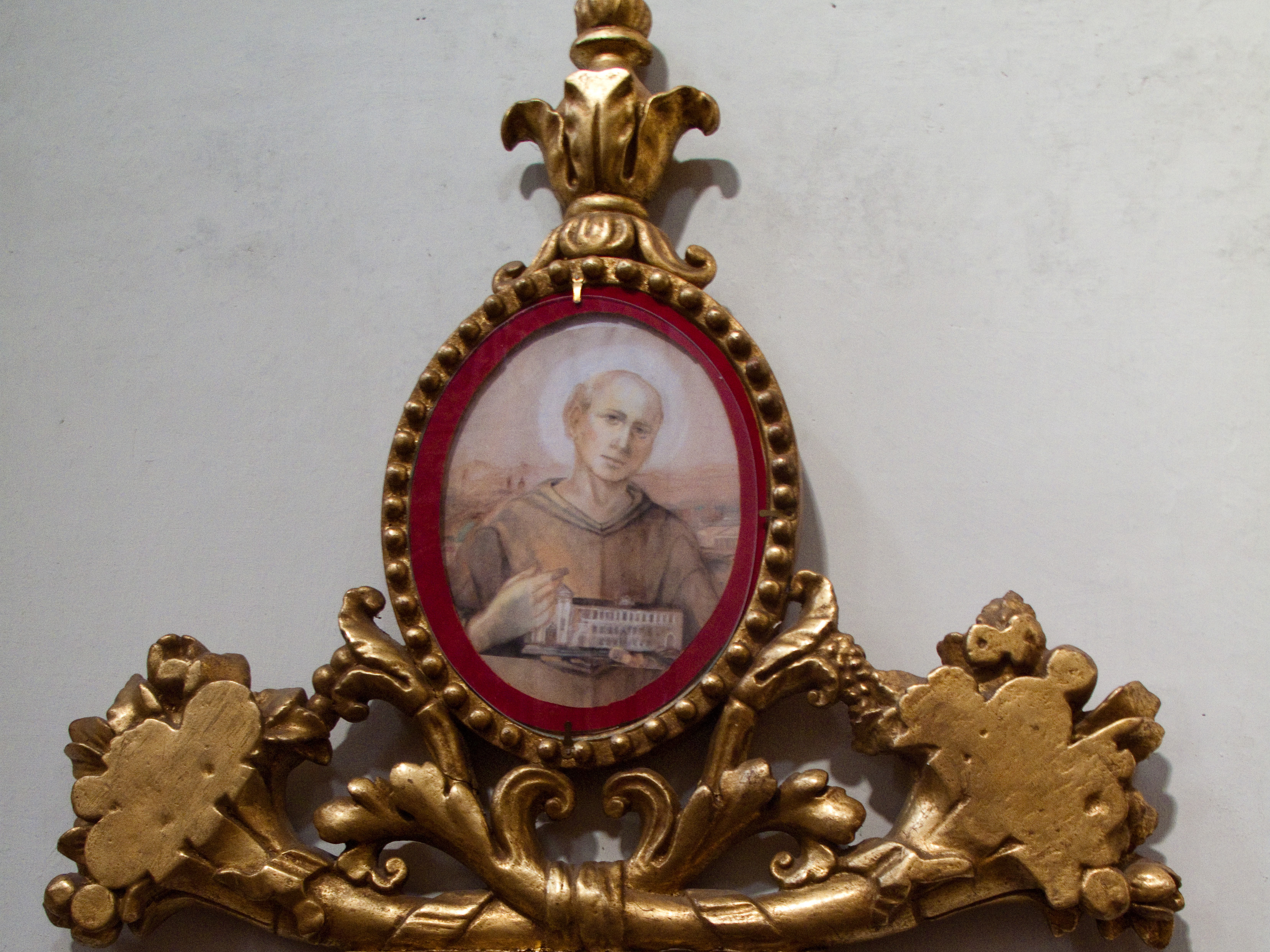
- Portrait of Marco da Montegallo in the church of San Giuliano in Vicenza, which preserves his relics
- Born: 1425; Montegallo, Ascoli Piceno, Papal States
- Died: 19 March 1496 (aged 71); Vicenza, Republic of Venice
- Venerated in: Roman Catholic Church
- Beatified: 20 September 1839, Saint Peter's Basilica, Papal States by Pope Gregory XVI
- Feast: 20 March
- Patronage: physicians, married couples, Montegallo

Marco da Montegallo (1425 - 19 March 1496) was an Italian religious priest from the Order of Friars Minor. He was born to a nobleman and served as a doctor in Ascoli Piceno before he was pressured into marriage in 1451 - the couple annulled their marriage after both entered the religious life. Father Marco is best known for establishing pawnshops for the poor across various Italian cities and for being a preacher of love.

His beatification received ratification on 20 September 1839 after Pope Gregory XVI confirmed the late priest's local 'cultus' - or a spontaneous and enduring popular devotion on the part of the faithful. His feast is celebrated on 20 March rather than his death date of 19 March due to it being the feast of Saint Joseph.

== Life ==
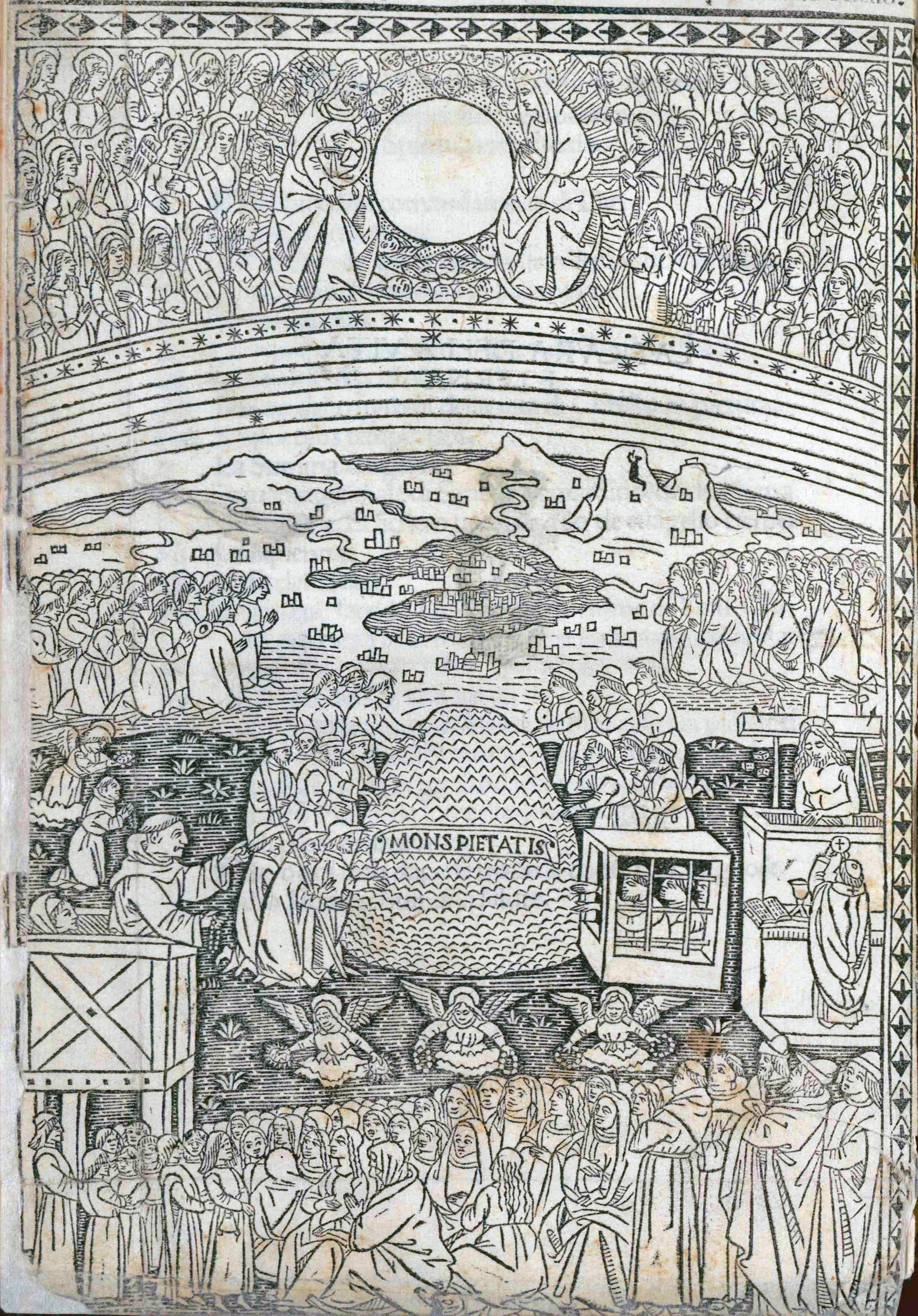
Tabula della salute, 1494

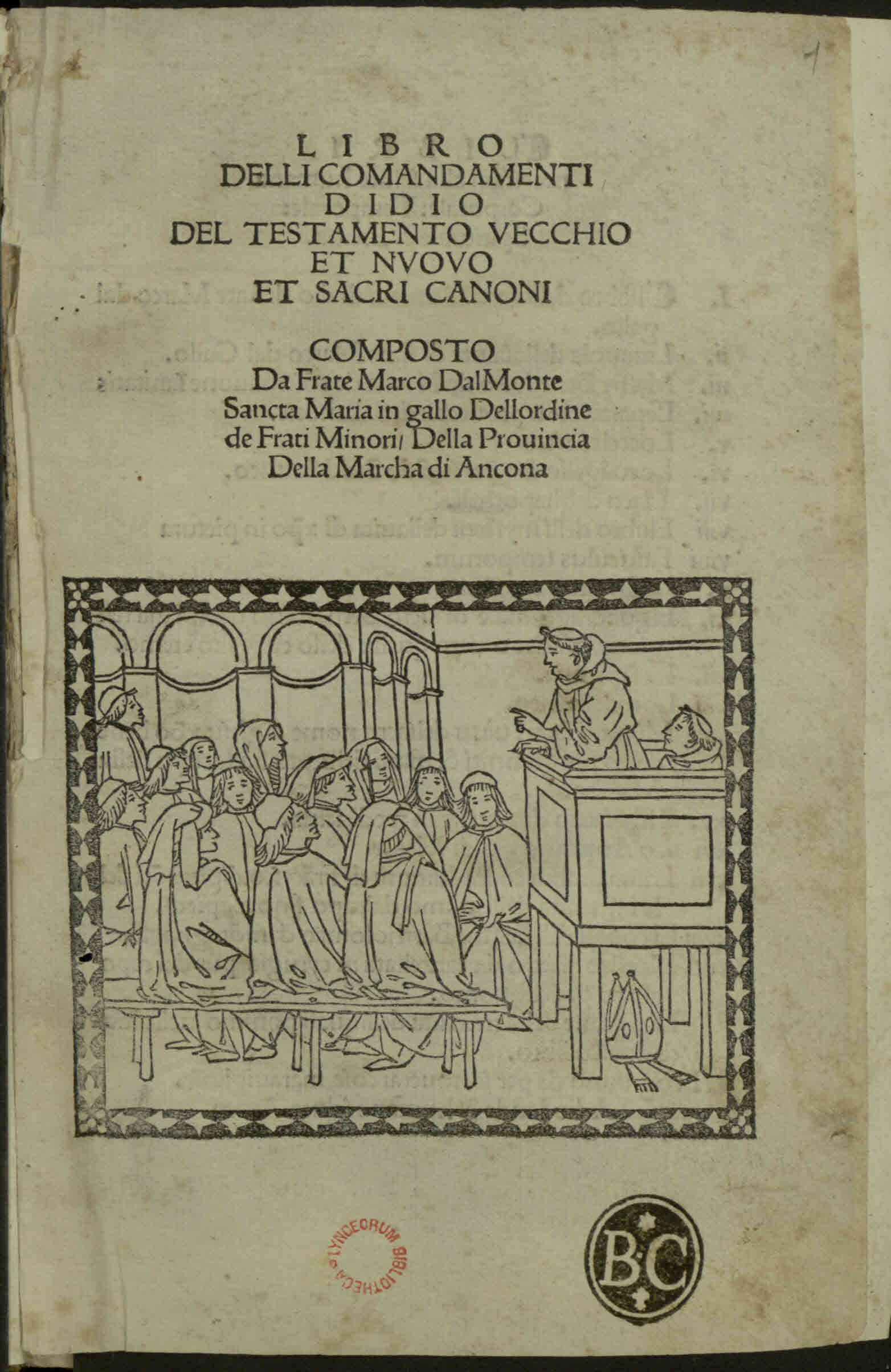
Libro dei comandamenti di Dio, 1494

Marco da Montegallo was born in 1425 in Montegallo - in the province of Ascoli Piceno - to a nobleman from the Marches of Ancona.

Marco studied under the humanist Enoch d'Ascoli and later studied at universities in both Perugia and Bologna where he received his doctorate in both law and medicine. From 1448 he worked as a doctor in his home province.

He married Chiara de Tibaldeschi in 1451 - with great reluctance - after his father pressured him to do so but his father later died in 1452 which prompted the couple to evaluate their marriage to discuss their true life callings. The pair later annulled their marriage and pursued their separate vocations into the Franciscans with him becoming a member of the Order of Friars Minor and she joining the Poor Clares as a nun. He joined the order in their branch in the convent of Santa Maria in Valle in Gallo at Fabriano and commenced his novitiate in 1452 - and concluded it in 1453 - at the convent of l'Eremita Valdisasso near Fabriano. Marco was ordained to the priesthood sometime in the 1450s and was at once made the superior of Santa Maria de San Severino and he held that position from 1454 to 1455. It was there that a voice said to him: "Go brother Marco and preach about love".

He - alongside Blessed Bernardine of Feltre - established a wide range of charitable pawnshops for the poor that became known as the "Monti di Pietà". To help the poor with loans he founded the Monte di Credito su Pegno di Vicenza, a bank in Vicenza which was completed in around twelve months after he received funds to establish it and next to the Franciscan's house in that town other banks and hospitals were established. A friend of his founded one in Fabriano and Saint James of the Marches co-established another Monte di Pietà in Perugia. Marco founded stores in Fano in 1471 and in Arcevia in 1483. He knew Blessed Domenico da Leonessa.

He preached across various Italian cities and in 1494 in Florence published a book while issuing another edition in Siena in 1495 while preaching for Lent. The plague ravaged Camerino and he assured the people that it would cease if all the people repented from their sins and confessed in a move that prompted them all to flock to him and confess - this caused the plague epidemic to stop. In 1480 he became a promoter and collector of tithes for the crusade against the Ottoman Empire after Pope Sixtus IV appointed him to that position.

The priest decided to fast in Lent in 1496 and in the middle of the Lenten season grew ill. On his deathbed he asked a companion to provide him with the sacraments for the final time and asked another to read him the words: "He bowed His head and gave up the ghost" at which point the ailing Marco died from his illness on 19 March 1496 in Vicenza.

His remains were interred though later relocated in 1522 in the church of Saint Biagio but were later interred in a chapel in the church of San Giuliano in 1797.

== Beatification ==
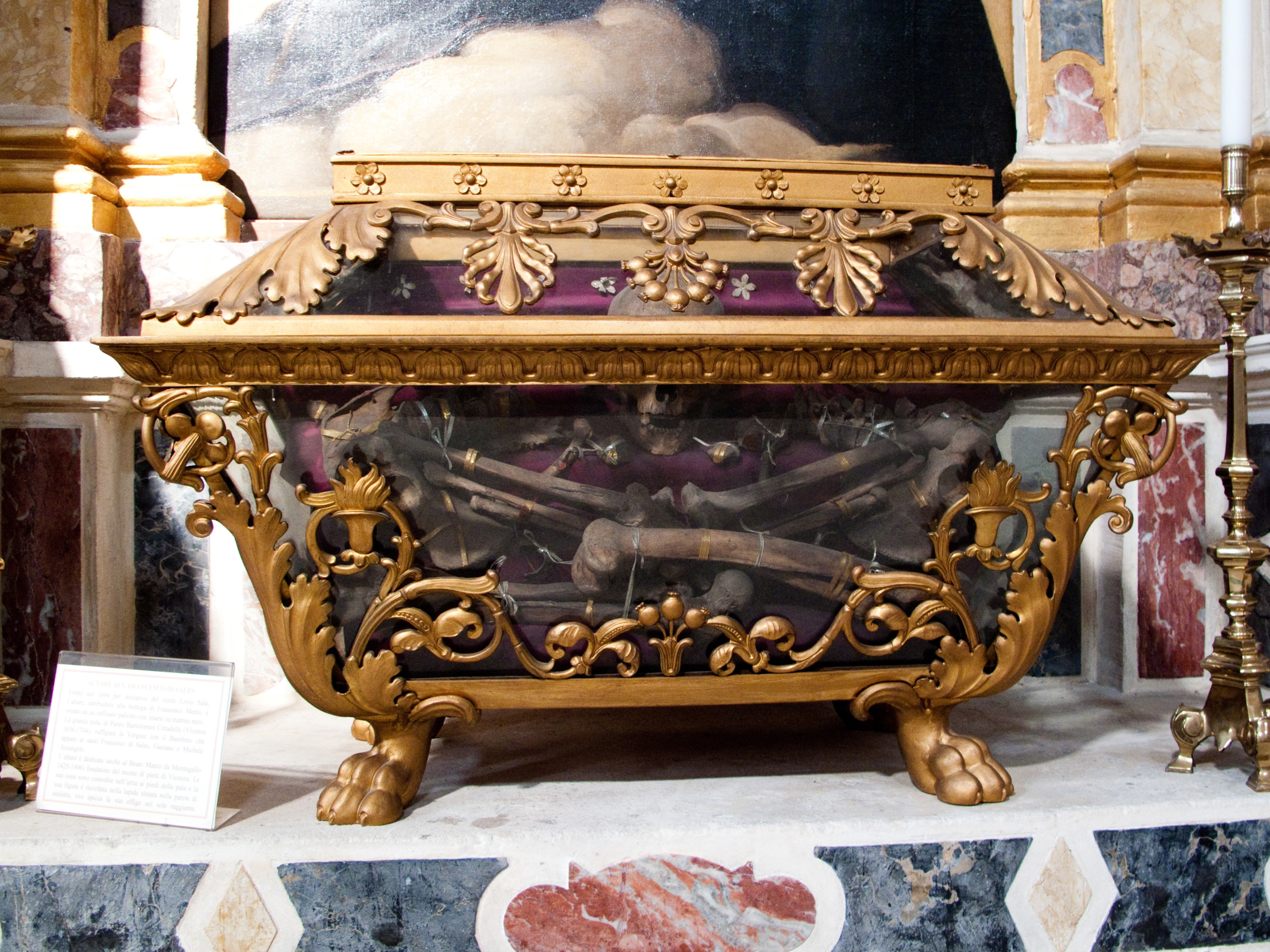
Relics in a reliquiary the parish of San Giuliano in Vicenza

The ratification for the late Franciscan's local 'cultus' - or popular devotion - allowed for Pope Gregory XVI to issue a decree that conferred beatification on the late friar on 20 September 1839. His feast is not celebrated on the date of his death as is the norm but rather on 20 March because 19 March is the feast of Saint Joseph.
