= Christopher Krebs =

Christopher Krebs may refer to:

- Christopher B. Krebs (fl. 2004–present), Associate Professor of Classics at Stanford University
- Christopher C. Krebs (born 1977), former Director of the U.S. Cybersecurity and Infrastructure Security Agency
