= Auiones =

1st century Germanic tribe

The Aviones or Auiones (*Awioniz meaning "island people") were one of the Nerthus-worshipping Germanic tribes of the 1st century mentioned by Tacitus in Germania, and they lived either in the southern Jutland Peninsula. The Aviones are also sometimes equated to the Chaibones mentioned in the late third century, and the Eowan mentioned in Widsith.

Tacitus wrote of the group as defended by rivers and forests, who lived east of the Elbe, and north of the Langobardi and Semnones:

(Original Latin) "Reudigni deinde et Aviones et Anglii et Varini et Eudoses et Suardones et Nuithones fluminibus aut silvis muniuntur. Nec quicquam notabile in singulis, nisi quod in commune Nerthum, id est Terram matrem, colunt eamque intervenire rebus hominum, invehi populis arbitrantur. ..." --Tacitus, Germania, 40.

(English translation) "There follow in order the Reudignians, and Aviones, and Angles, and Varinians, and Eudoses, and Suardones and Nuithones; all defended by rivers or forests. Nor in one of these nations does aught remarkable occur, only that they universally join in the worship of Herthum (Nerthus); that is to say, the Mother Earth."--Tacitus, Germania, 40, translated 1877 by Church and Brodribb.

Thus, according to Tacitus, the Aviones lived near the southern base of the Jutland Peninsula, near the Angles.

In the so-called catalogue of kings in the Old English Widsith, it is said that Oswine ruled over the Eowum. It is thought that the Varini and Eudoses named beside the Aviones in the list of Tacitus can be identified with the Wernum and Ytum whom the Widsith names in the immediate vicinity of the Eowan.

According to Kendrick, they probably lived on Öland. It is not only the meaning Island dwellers that connects them to the island Öland (meaning "Island land"), but also the Old English name for the island which is Eowland (mentioned by Wulfstan of Hedeby), "the land of the Eowan".

== See also ==
- List of Germanic peoples
