= Angles (tribe) =

Germanic tribe from present-day northern Germany

Angle / Engle
- The spread of Angles (orange) and Saxons (blue) to the British Isles around 500 AD

Regions with significant populations
- origin: southern Jutland: Schleswig (Angeln, Schwansen, Danish Wahld, North Frisia/North Frisian Islands); Holstein (Eiderstedt, Dithmarschen) destination: Heptarchy (England)

Languages
- Proto-English, later Old English

Religion
- Originally Germanic and Anglo-Saxon paganism, later Christianity

Related ethnic groups
- Anglo-Saxons, Anglo-Frisian, Anglo-Normans, English, Lowland Scots, Anglo, Saxons, Frisii, Jutes

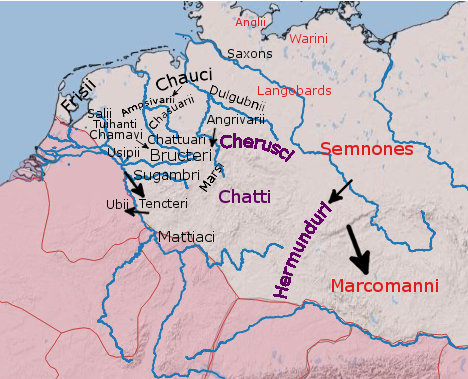
The approximate positions of some Germanic peoples reported by Graeco-Roman authors in the 1st century. Suevian peoples in red, and other Irminones in purple

The Angles (Old English: Engle, Latin: Anglii) were one of the main Germanic peoples who settled in Great Britain in the post-Roman period. They founded several kingdoms of the Heptarchy in Anglo-Saxon England. Their name, which probably derives from the Angeln peninsula, is the root of the names England ("Engla land", "Land of the Angles"), and English, for both its people and its language. According to Tacitus, writing around 100 AD, a people known as Angles (Anglii) lived beyond (apparently northeast of) the Langobards and Semnones, who lived near the River Elbe.

== Etymology ==
The name of the Angles may have been first recorded in Latinised form, as Anglii, in the Germania of Tacitus. It is thought to derive from the name of the area they originally inhabited, the Angeln peninsula, which is on the Baltic Sea coast of Schleswig-Holstein.

Two related theories have been advanced, which attempt to give the name a Germanic etymology:

1. It originated from the Germanic root for "narrow" (compare German and Dutch eng = "narrow"), meaning "the Narrow [Water]", i.e., the Schlei estuary; the root would be *h₂enǵʰ, "tight".
2. The name derives from "hook" (as in angling for fish), in reference to the shape of the peninsula where they lived; Indo-European linguist Julius Pokorny derives it from Proto-Indo-European *h₂enk-, "bend" (see ankle). Alternatively, the Angles may have been called such because they were a fishing people or were originally descended from such.

In Old English, the same term Engle refers to the Angles before and after the migration to Britain. As most Germanic settlers in Britain during this time were Angles, the settled area became referred to as England ("Engla land", "the land or country of the Angles"). While Latin and Celtic-speaking populations referred to the Germanic speakers in Britain in general by terms related to "Saxons", they came to refer to themselves as Engle ("Angles", "English people"). "Angle" and related terms therefore have some ambiguity in their scope. From Engle is also derived "English" (Old English: Englisc).

According to Gesta Danorum, the brothers Dan and Angul were made rulers by the consent of their people because of their bravery and the Danes and Angles are respectively named from them.

== Greco-Roman historiography ==
=== Tacitus ===
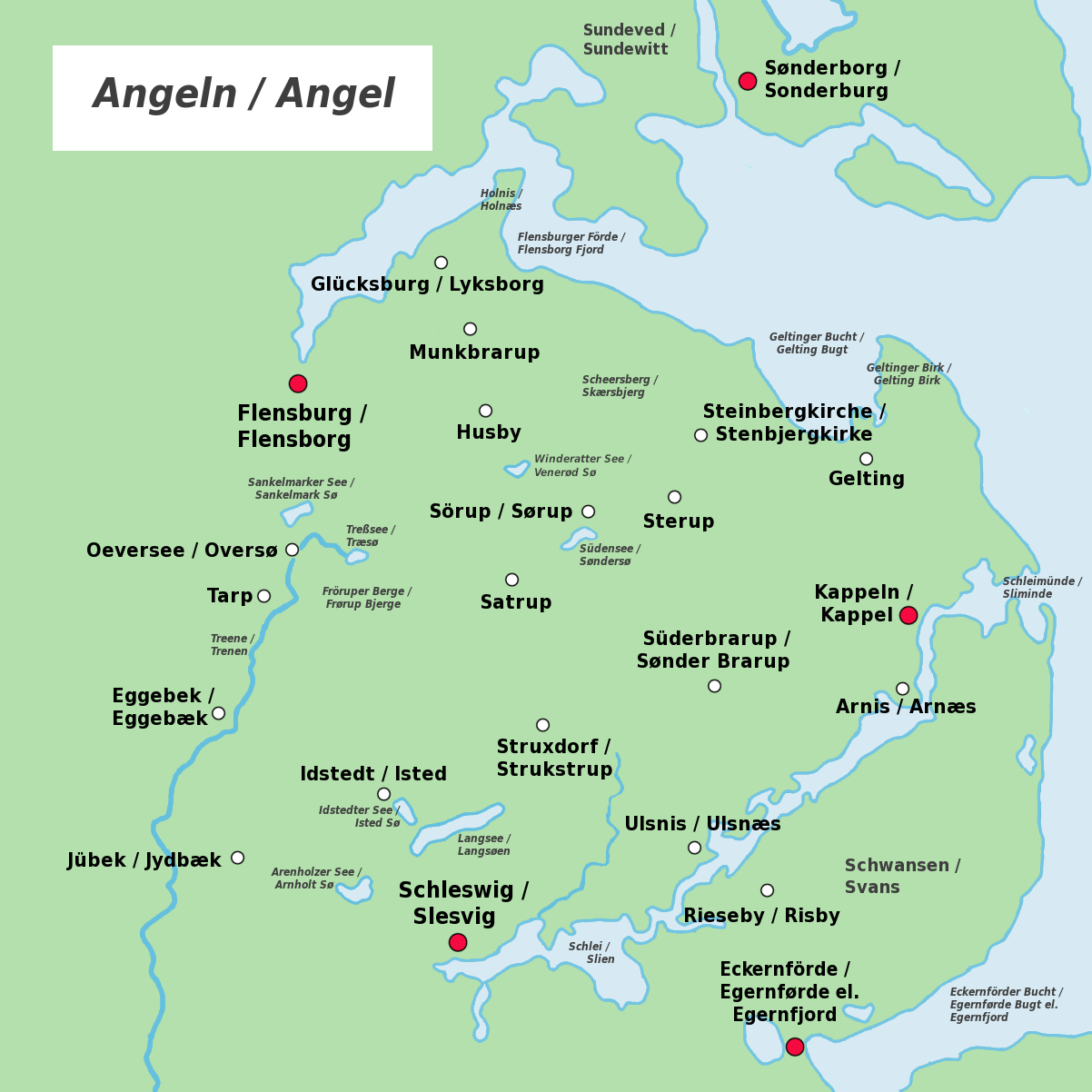
Angeln in northern Schleswig-Holstein.

The earliest surviving mention of the Angles is in chapter 40 of Tacitus's Germania written around AD 98. Tacitus describes the "Anglii" as one of the more remote Suebic tribes living beyond the Semnones and Langobardi, who lived near the lower Elbe, and were better known to the Romans. He grouped the Angles with several other tribes in that region, the Reudigni, Aviones, Varini, Eudoses, Suarines, and Nuithones. According to Tacitus, they were all living behind ramparts of rivers and woods, and therefore inaccessible to attack.

He gives no precise indication of their geographical situation but states that, together with the six other tribes, they worshipped Nerthus, or Mother Earth, whose sanctuary was located on "an island in the Ocean". The Eudoses are generally considered to be the Jutes and these names have been associated with localities in Jutland or on the Baltic coast. The coast contains sufficient estuaries, inlets, rivers, islands, swamps, and marshes to have been inaccessible to those not familiar with the terrain, such as the Romans, who considered it unknown and inaccessible.

The majority of scholars believe that the Anglii lived on the coasts of the Baltic Sea, probably in the southern part of the Jutland peninsula. This view is based partly on Old English and Danish traditions regarding persons and events of the fourth century, and partly because striking affinities to the cult of Nerthus as described by Tacitus are to be found in pre-Christian Scandinavian religion.

=== Ptolemy ===
Surviving versions of the work of Ptolemy, who wrote around AD 150, in his Geography (2.10), describe the Angles in a confusing manner. In one passage, the Sueboi Angeilloi (or Suevi Angili), are described as living inland between the northern Rhine and central Elbe, but apparently not touching either river, with the Suebic Langobardi on the Rhine to their west, and the Suebic Semnones on the Elbe stretching to their east, forming a band of Suebic peoples. This positioning of the Langobardi and Angli is unexpected, as are the positions of many of the peoples in this passage. The text is believed to result from the combining of different types of older texts. As pointed out by Gudmund Schütte, the neighbouring Langobards appear in two places, and the ones near the Rhine appears to be there by mistake. Schütte, in his analysis, believes that the Angles are placed correctly relative to the Langobardi to their west, but that these have been positioned in the wrong place. The Langobardi also appear in the expected position on the lower Elbe, and the Angles would be expected to their northeast, based upon Tacitus.

Another theory is that all or part of the Angles dwelt or moved among other coastal people, perhaps confederated up to the basin of the Saale (in the neighbourhood of the ancient canton of Engilin) on the Unstrut valleys below the Kyffhäuserkreis, from which region the Lex Anglorum et Werinorum hoc est Thuringorum is believed by many to have come. The ethnic names of Frisians and Warines are also attested in these Saxon districts. }

=== Procopius ===
An especially early reference to the Angli in Britain is by the 6th-century Byzantine historian Procopius (who however expressed doubts about the stories he had heard—apparently from Frankish diplomats—about events in the west). He does not mention the Saxons, but he states that an island called Brittia (which he says is separate and distinct from Britain itself) was settled by three nations, each ruled by its own king: the Angili, Frissones, and Brittones. Each nation was so prolific that it sent large numbers of individuals every year to the Franks, who:

allow them to settle in the part of their land which appears to be more deserted, and by this means they say [the Franks] are winning over the island. Thus it actually happened that not long ago the king of the Franks, in sending some of his intimates on an embassy to the Emperor Justinian in Byzantium, sent with them some of the Angili, thus seeking to establish his claim that this island was ruled by him.

According to the digression of Procopius about the Angli, the Warnian king Hermegisclus made a strategic alliance with the Frankish ruler of the neighbouring kingdom of Theudebert I (ruler Austrasia 533-547), marrying his sister Theudechild. However, in contrast he had engaged his son with the sister of the Anglian ruler who ruled on Brittia. Before his death he expressed the wish to have his son married to his stepmother Theudechild instead. As a result when king Hermegisclus died, the Warini compelled his son Radigis to marry his stepmother. The princess, who is not named in the story, did not accept this, and crossed the North Sea with an army of 400 ships and 100,000 men, seeking retaliation. After a battle won by the Anglians, Radigis was caught hiding in a wood not far from the mouth of the Rhine and had no other choice than to marry his fiancée.

== Medieval historiography ==
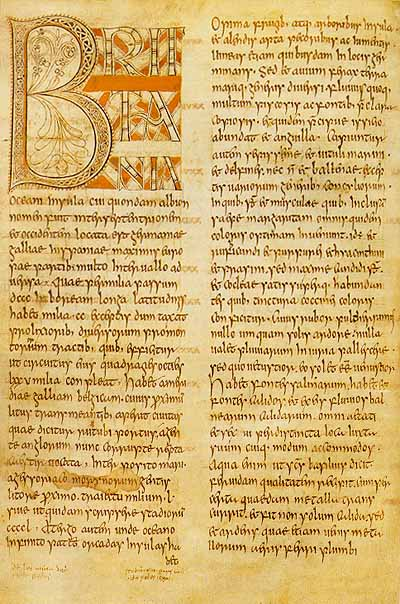
The Saint Petersburg Bede, 8th century

Bede (died 735) stated that the Anglii, before coming to Great Britain, dwelt in a land called Angulus, "which lies between the province of the Jutes and the Saxons, and remains unpopulated to this day." A similar account, possibly based on Bede's, is given by the 9th-century Historia Brittonum.

King Alfred the Great (died 899) also summarized an account by a Norwegian seafarer Ohthere of Hålogaland who described a voyage from Norway to Hedeby which he said lay between the Wends, Saxons and Angles. On the two days sailing south before he reached Hedeby the lands on his right were Jutland ("Gotland"), Zealand ("Sillende"), and many islands. The text notes that the "Engle" had lived "on these lands" (Jutland, Zealand and the islands) before they came to England. (Note: See the translation by Sweet, noted by Loyn) In Alfred's general geographical section he notes "Ongle", "Sillende", and a part of the Danish land, as all being to the "northwest" of the continental "Old Saxons" where their lands extended northwards, east of the mouth of the Elbe. (To the north and northeast of these Saxons were various Slavic peoples, with the most northerly being the Obotrites ("Afdrede").) A later part of the same passage simply describes the northern neighbours of these Saxons and Obotrites as all being in the land of the "South Danes".

The later chronicler Æthelweard (died about 1000) repeated Bede's account that the homeland "Anglia", lay between "Saxones" in Old Saxony, and Jutes ("Giotos"), but specified that its capital was itself called "Sleswic" in Old English, and "Haithaby" in Danish, thus equating the Anglian homeland to Schleswig and the area around Hedeby.

Confirmation is afforded by English and Danish traditions relating to two kings named Wermund and Offa of Angel, from whom the Mercian royal family claimed descent and whose exploits are connected with Angeln, Schleswig, and Rendsburg.

Danish tradition has preserved record of two governors of Schleswig, father and son, in their service, Frowinus (Freawine) and Wigo (Wig), from whom the royal family of Wessex claimed descent. During the fifth century, the Anglii invaded Great Britain, after which time their name does not recur on the continent except in the title of the legal code issued to the Thuringians: Lex Angliorum et Werinorum hoc est Thuringorum.

The Angles are the subject of a legend about Pope Gregory I (died 604), who happened to see a group of Angle children from Deira for sale as slaves in the Roman market. As the story was told by Bede, Gregory was struck by the unusual appearance of the slaves and asked about their background. When told they were called Anglii (Angles), he replied with a Latin pun that translates well into English: "Bene, nam et angelicam habent faciem, et tales angelorum in caelis decet esse coheredes" (It is well, for they have an angelic face, and such people ought to be co-heirs of the angels in heaven). Supposedly, this encounter inspired the pope to launch a mission to bring Christianity to their countrymen.

== Archaeology ==
The province of Schleswig has proved rich in prehistoric antiquities that date apparently from the fourth and fifth centuries. A large cremation cemetery has been found at Borgstedt, between Rendsburg and Eckernförde, and it has yielded many urns and brooches closely resembling those found in pagan graves in England. Of still greater importance are the great deposits at Thorsberg moor (in Angeln) and Nydam, which contained large quantities of arms, ornaments, articles of clothing, agricultural implements, etc., and in Nydam, even ships. By the help of these discoveries, Angle culture in the age preceding the migration into Britannia can be pieced together.

== Anglian kingdoms in England ==
Angles, Saxons, and Jutes throughout England

According to sources such as the History of Bede, after the invasion of Britannia, the Angles split up and founded the kingdoms of Northumbria, East Anglia, and Mercia. H. R. Loyn has observed in this context that "a sea voyage is perilous to tribal institutions", and the apparently tribe-based kingdoms were formed in England. Early times had two northern kingdoms (Bernicia and Deira) and two midland ones (Middle Anglia and Mercia), which had by the seventh century resolved themselves into two Angle kingdoms, viz., Northumbria and Mercia.

Northumbria held suzerainty amidst the Germanic presence in the British Isles in the 7th century, but was eclipsed by the rise of Mercia in the 8th century. Both kingdoms fell in the great assaults of the Danish Viking armies in the 9th century. Their royal houses were effectively destroyed in the fighting, and their Angle populations came under the Danelaw. Further south, the Saxon kings of Wessex withstood the Danish assaults. Then in the late 9th and early 10th centuries, the kings of Wessex defeated the Danes and took control of areas inhabited by Angles that were formerly in the Danelaw.

They united their house in marriage with the surviving Angle royalty and were accepted by the Angles as their kings, ultimately resulting in the Kingdom of England. The regions of East Anglia and Northumbria are still known by their original titles. Northumbria once stretched as far north as what is now southeast Scotland, including Edinburgh, and as far south as the Humber Estuary and even the River Witham.

The rest of that people stayed at the centre of the Angle homeland in the northeastern portion of the modern German Bundesland of Schleswig-Holstein, on the Jutland Peninsula. There, a small peninsular area is still called Angeln today and is formed as a triangle drawn roughly from modern Flensburg on the Flensburger Fjord to the City of Schleswig and then to Maasholm, on the Schlei inlet.

== Bibliography ==
- "Angles" , Encyclopædia Britannica, vol. 2 (9th ed.), 1878, p. 30
- Bede (731). Historia ecclesiastica gentis Anglorum [Ecclesiastical History of the English People] (in Latin).
- Chadwick, Hector Munro (1911). "Angli" . In Chisholm, Hugh (ed.). Encyclopædia Britannica. Vol. 2 (11th ed.). Cambridge University Press. pp. 18–19.
- Jane, Lionel Cecil, ed. (1910). Ecclesiastical History of the English Nation . Translated by John Stevens.
- Tacitus, Publius Cornelius. De origine et situ Germanorum [On the Origin and Situation of the Germans] (in Latin).
- Germania. Translated by Church, Alfred John; Brodribb, William Jackson. 1876.
- Schütte, Gudmund (1917). Ptolemy's Maps of Northern Europe: A Reconstruction of the Prototypes. Copenhagen: Græbe for H. Hagerup for the Royal Danish Geographical Society.
- Sweet, Henry (1883). King Alfred's Orosius. Oxford: E. Pickard Hall & J. H. Stacy for N. Trübner & Co. for the Early English Text Society.
- Loyn, Henry Royston (1991). A Social and Economic History of England: Anglo-Saxon England and the Norman Conquest (2nd ed.). London: Longman Group. ISBN 978-0582072978.
