= Enoch of Ascoli =

Enoch of Ascoli (c. 1400 – c. 1457) was a humanist and agent of Nicholas V in charge of collecting manuscripts around Europe for the newly founded library of the pope.

He is notably responsible for the finding and retrieval, from Hersfeld Abbey, the only existing manuscript of Tacitus's minor books including the Agricola and the Germania.
