= Monte di Credito su Pegno di Vicenza =

Italian bank

Fondazione Monte di Pietà di Vicenza
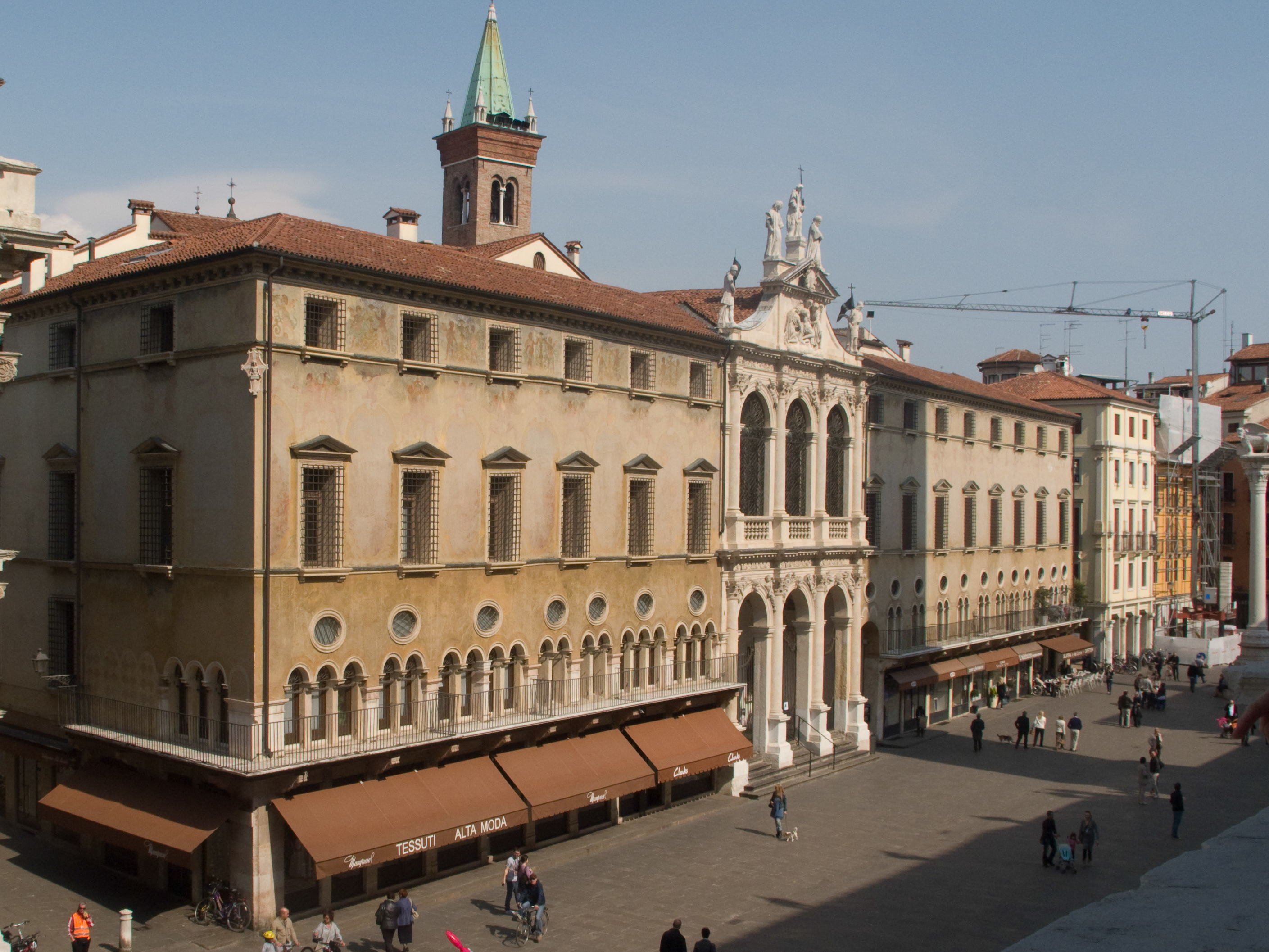
- The mount (left and right wing) and the Chiesa (middle)
- Formerly: Monte di Pietà di Vicenza; Monte di Credito su Pegno di Vicenza
- Type: Statutory corporation
- Industry: Financial services (former)
- Founded: 1486
- Founder: Marco da Montegallo
- Fate: Ceased as bank in 1996; continued as a local charity in the same year
- Headquarters: Palazzo del Monte di Pietà, Vicenza, Italy
- Key people: Giuseppe Nardin (chairman)
Services
Pawnbroker	(discontinued)
mount of piety	(discontinued)
- Total assets: €1.96 million (2016)
- Total equity: €1.81 million (2016)
- Subsidiaries: Palazzo del Monte S.p.A. (100%)
- Website: www.fondazionemontedipietadivicenza.it

Monte di Credito su Pegno di Vicenza was an Italian bank based in Vicenza. It was originated as a mount of piety known as Monte di Pietà di Vicenza. Due to Legge Amato, the legal person of the bank spin off its banking business as a società per azioni in 1995, and sold the business to Cariverona Banca in 1996; the original legal person of the bank became Fondazione Monte di Pietà di Vicenza. The bank was known for its headquarters, Palazzo del Monte di Pietà in the Piazza dei Signori.

== History ==
Monte di Pietà di Vicenza was founded in 1486 as a mount of piety (Italian: monte di pietà), by Franciscan Marco da Montegallo in the Republic of Venice, 24 years after the first recorded mount of Italy was founded in Perugia, by other Franciscans, Bernardine of Feltre and Michele Carcano, in the Papal States. The Chiesa di San Vincenzo was also owned by the mount.

In 1822 the mount also founded Cassa di Risparmio di Vicenza, the local savings bank of the city, at that time part of the Kingdom of Lombardy–Venetia, in the Austrian Empire. It was closed in 1838 and re-open in 1913; in 1924 the savings bank was independent from the mount, but merged with Cassa di Risparmio di Verona in 1927−28.

In 1930s, the mount changed the name to Monte di Credito su Pegno di Vicenza, due to an enactment of a law regarding the denomination of the mounts of piety of Italy.

Due to Legge Amato, the mount closed its banking activities by selling the business to Cariverona Banca (Cassa di Risparmio di Verona, Vicenza, Belluno e Ancona) in 1996, the successor of Cassa di Risparmio di Verona e Vicenza of 1927−28 merger, after the incorporation of the banking business as a subsidiary in società per azioni legal form on 24 November 1995, as Monte di Credito su Pegno di Vicenza S.p.A. The S.p.A. had a share capital of 2.6 billion lire, around ECU 1.2 million, the predecessor of euro, in 1995 average exchange rate; since the introduction of euro, the share capital was set at €1,341,600, divided by €5.16 per share.

According to Italian law TUB (literally joint-law of bank and credit), the mount was classified as a second category mount, which had to cease its banking (lending) activities before 1 January 1996.

== Banking foundation ==
The original legal person of the bank was also renamed to Fondazione Monte di Pietà di Vicenza in 1995, which continued the charity function of the mount, as a banking foundation. As of 31 December 2016, the major assets of the banking foundation, was a subsidiary called Palazzo del Monte S.p.A., for a book value of €1.6 million. The S.p.A. was formerly known as Monte di Credito su Pegno di Vicenza S.p.A., which changed to current name circa 2004.

The foundation was 1 of the 86 member banking foundations of the trade association Associazione di Fondazioni e di Casse di Risparmio S.p.A.

== Palazzo del Monte di Pietà ==
Palazzo del Monte di Pietà is the historical headquarters of the bank. Nowadays, it is a tourist attraction.

== See also ==
- List of banks in Italy
