= Codex Hersfeldensis =

9th-century manuscript

The Codex Hersfeldensis was a manuscript from the Early Middle Ages. Written between 830 and 850, the codex was found in Hersfeld Abbey in Germany in the first half of the 15th century. The codex was brought to Italy by Enoch of Ascoli in 1455, where it was divided up and copied. The original has since been lost. The Codex Hersfeldensis is considered to be the original source for the surviving manuscripts of the Opera Minora – the shorter works of Tacitus, including the Germania.

In 1425, Heinrich von Grebenstein, a Hersfeld monk visiting Rome, informed the apostolic secretary, humanist, and collector of Latin manuscripts, Poggio Bracciolini, of the discovery of copies of ancient works at the abbey. Grebenstein sent a list of the works to Poggio who recognized the value of the finds and sent his agent Niccolò Niccoli to Hersfeld to obtain a detailed inventory. In 1431, Niccoli identified three writings of Tacitus as works contained within the codex (Germania, Agricola, Dialogus de oratoribus), as well as a fragment of Suetonius's De grammaticis et rhetoribus from De viris illustribus with their incipit and volume in folia:

- Cornelii Taciti De origine et situ Germanorum liber, […] xii folia
- Cornelii Taciti De vita Iulii Agricolae, […] xiiii folia
- Dialogus de oratoribus, […] xviii folia
- Suetonii Tranquilli De grammaticis et rhetoribus, […] folia vii

Though Poggio tried to obtain it for himself, the codex was not brought to Rome until Enoch of Ascoli acquired it as part of Pope Nicholas V's search for books in Germany and Northern Europe. After a few copies were made of the individual works, the manuscript disappeared without a trace.

The only existing manuscript that is considered a direct copy of the Codex Hersfeldensis is the Codex Aesinas Latinus 8, discovered in 1908 (catalogued as Codex Vittorio Emanuele 1631 in the Biblioteca Nazionale Centrale di Roma). The humanist Stefano Guarnieri created the Aesinas in the period after Pietro Candido Decembrio described the Codex Hersfeldensis, no later than 1474. It contains parts of the Agricola, the full Germania, as well as other writings. Eight folia written in Carolingian minuscule are included in the Agricola section. This Agricola fragment is generally considered to be the only original piece of the Codex Hersfeldensis that has survived to the present day.
