= Codex Aesinas =

15th-century composite manuscript

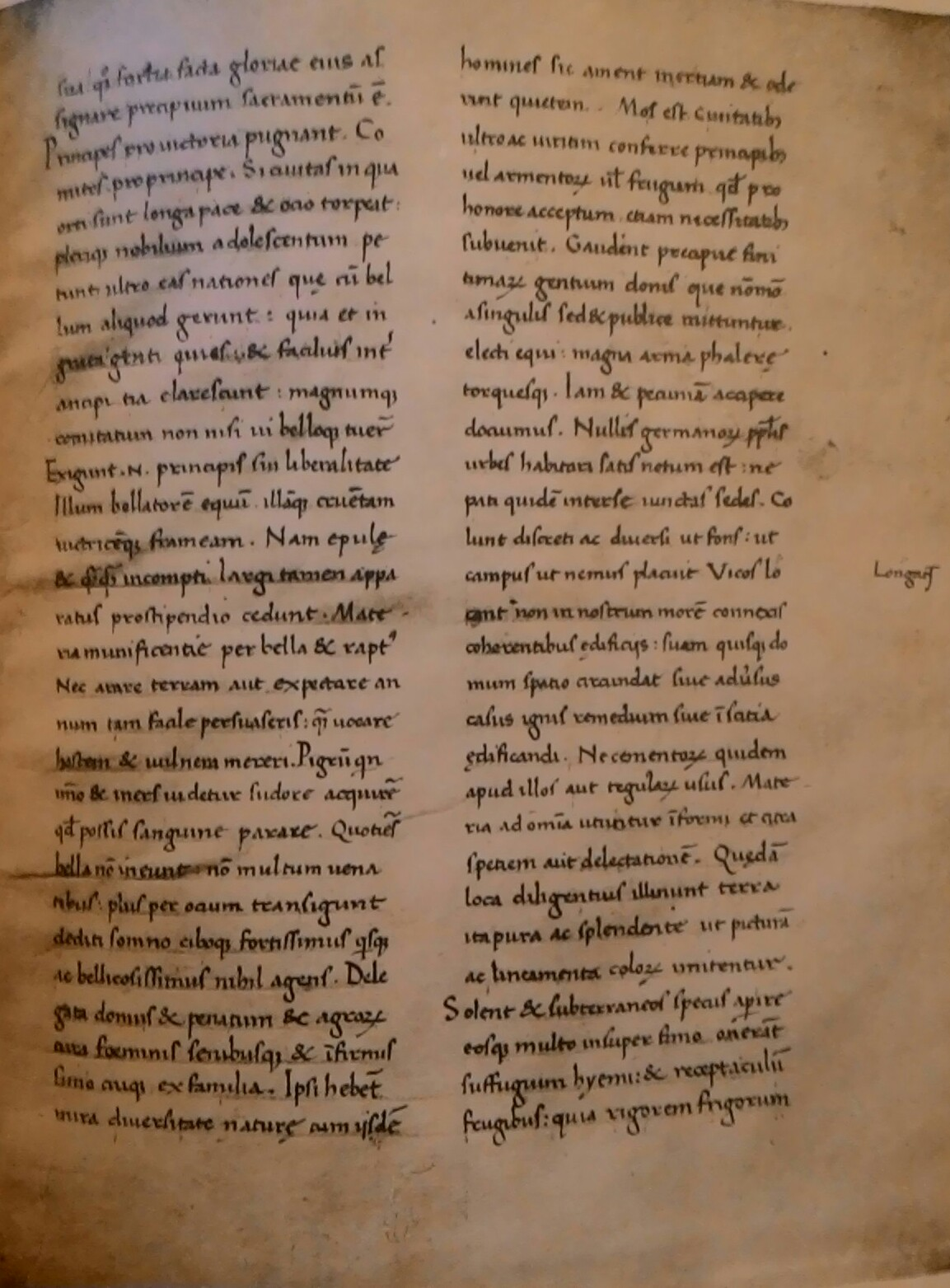
Codex Aesinas

The Codex Aesinas (Codex Aesinas Latinus 8) is a 15th-century composite manuscript. It was discovered by chance in 1902 at the former private estate of the Count Baldeschi Balleani family located in Jesi, in the province of Ancona, Italy. The manuscript is considered especially valuable because it contains the Opera Minora (shorter works) of the Roman historian Tacitus, including the Agricola and the Germania. Due to the inclusion of eight folia written in Carolingian minuscule script within the Agricola, the Tacitus portion of the Codex is generally regarded as a direct copy of the missing Codex Hersfeldensis (H), a 9th-century manuscript that contained a copy of the original Opera Minora by Tacitus. The Carolingian folia are thought to be originals taken from the lost codex. In 1994, the Baldeschi Balleani family sold the codex to the Biblioteca Nazionale Centrale di Roma where it is now known as the Codex Vittorio Emanuele 1631.

== Discovery and Fate ==
In 1902, Count Aurelio Guglielmi Balleani commissioned Cesare Annibaldi, a local philologist and professor, to examine some manuscripts collected in the count's private library.

The manuscripts dated to the second half of the 15th century, and had belonged to the library of the humanist Stefano Guarnieri (1425–1493), a chancellor and diplomat in Perugia, which he had built with his brother Francesco. The Guarnieris were born in Osimo, only 15 km from Jesi, and came from an educated family of landowners that had been members of the nobility since the 12th century. This library was inherited by the Balleani family through the marriage of Gaetano Balleani to Sperandia Guarnieri, a descendant of Francesco, in 1793. It remained in the family's possession until 1994.

Annibaldi discovered the works of Tacitus in one of Guarnieri's manuscripts, and in the Agricola quaternion found eight folia consisting of sixteen pages written in Carolingian minuscule script from the early 9th century (fl. 56 – 63). The manuscript also contained a Latin version of the Dictys Cretensis, which according to the incipit, came from an L. Septimius, also written almost entirely in Carolingian minuscule from the 9th century. Since the lettering of the quaternion matched exactly Pier Candido Decembrio's description of the Agricola in the Hersfeldensis from the year 1455, Annibaldi concluded that this was a fragment of the lost original document. Guarnieri must have acquired the Agricola section from the Hersfeldensis and copied the missing parts as well as the Germania from H. As a result, he published his findings: in 1907, a facsimile of the Agricola with collations of the Dictys and the Germania, and in 1910 a facsimile of the Germania with a diplomatically edited text.

In 1929 the family tried to auction the codex through Sotheby's in London without success and it was taken off the market. In the 1930s the codex drew attention from Nazi ideologues who regarded the included Germania as a foundational document of "germanic-German" history and ethnicity. In 1936, during Mussolini's state visit to Berlin, Hitler personally requested that the codex be given over to the German Reich, a request that Mussolini initially approved. He later changed his mind, however, due to widespread opposition among Italians, who considered the document to be an important part of their own national heritage. Through diplomatic mediation and Himmler's influence, the Italian government permitted Rudolf Till and Paul Lehmann of the Research Association of German Ahnenerbe to examine the codex in 1939. In 1943 the results of this examination were released along with photographic illustrations of the Agricola and Germania folia produced by the Istituto di Patologia del Libro in Rome. After the war, in 1947, a set of the photographs was transferred to the Widener Library at Harvard University through the U.S. Embassy in Italy.

Following the Allied invasion of Italy and the coup of June 1943 against Mussolini, Himmler ordered an SS command to Jesi in the autumn of that year to seize the codex. The command raided all three of the count's palazzi, but the search was unsuccessful. The anti-fascist family had been previously warned and had gone into hiding. The Aesinas had been concealed in a chest, which the SS command had overlooked. In the post-war period, the owners secured the manuscript in their own Florentine bank, where it suffered water damage from the flood of the Arno in 1966. In the following years, it was restored by a specialized laboratory in Grottaferrata, where it was also re-bound.

The Herzog August Library approached the Baldeschi Balleani family in 1987 to acquire the codex, but ultimately abandoned the purchase due to the damage. In 1993 the Italian Ministry of Culture expressed interest in purchasing the manuscript from the family's private library. As part of this effort, an official examined the Aesinas and two other manuscripts containing works by Cicero. The Italian government made an offer for all three, and the purchase was completed in June 1994. The three manuscripts were added to the collection of the Biblioteca Nazionale Centrale di Roma, where the Aesinas is catalogued as Vittorio Emanuele 1631.

As part of the 2000th anniversary of the Battle of the Teutoburg Forest in 2009, the Aesinas was presented to a wide audience for the first time in the three-part exhibition: "Imperium, Conflict, Myth" at the Lippisches Landesmuseum in Detmold, North Rhine-Westphalia.

== Description and Composition ==
The Aesinas includes 76 parchment folia in quarto format (27.3 × 22.0 cm; after restoration and rebinding 26.4 × 21.1 cm) with text in two columns of thirty lines each, their heights and widths varying slightly between 20.3 and 6.2 cm.

The parts from the 9th century have the introductory words written in all capital letters—prominent in the folia of the incipit—which are executed in alternating rows of red, gold and green. The incipit is red and gold, written in uncial script. In folio 40v a tree is drawn in red ink at the end of the text. Furthermore, the lettering of the Carolingian parts show rubrications throughout.

The parts that Stefano Guarnieri added in the 15th century deliberately reflect the appearance of the older 9th century manuscript. They have rubricated titles and alternating red and black rubricated capital lettering in the introductory text. Annibaldi was able to determine that Guarnieri was the author of the 15th-century sections by comparing them with his other surviving writings. Guarnieri had probably compiled the codex in the 1460s and had most likely copied the Tacitus parts either directly or indirectly from the Hersfeldensis. When copying he tried to match his writing to the Carolingian minuscule script of the original.

The codex is structured as follows:

- Folio 1 to 51 contains the Dictys Cretensis
  - Folia 2v to 4, 9, 10 and 51 written by Guarnieri
  - Folia 5 to 8 and 11–50 of Carolingian origin
- Folio 52 to 65 contains the Agricola
  - Folio 52 to 55, 64 and 65 written by Guarnieri
  - Folio 56 to 63 of the Carolingian quaternion with glosses and corrigenda by a contemporary proofreader from the first half of the 9th century. They contain the text from Chapter 14.1 munia to 40.2 missum. Bernhard Bischoff dated these folia to the middle of the 9th century. He suspected a West Fraconian origin from the Loire region.
- Folio 66 to 75 contain the Germania, written entirely by Guarnieri.

There are also palimpsest folia which Guarnieri initially copied, but then shaved in order to rewrite. They include the Carolingian folia, among others, traces of which remain recognizable. The palimpsests are in the following sections:

- Dictys Cretensis:
  - Folio 1 contains the prologue and I 1–2 (transmissum)
  - Folio 2 contains Dictys I 22 (cunctis) – II 2 (secundo)
  - Folio 2v overwritten by Guarnieri with the Prologue of the Dictys
- Agricola:
  - Folia 69 and 76 contain the Agricola, chapter 40.2 to 46.4
- Germania:
  - Folio 69 overwritten by Guarnieri with Germania chapter 14.1 to 19.1
  - Folio 76 Carolingian, erased double-size sheet, used as an endpaper

== Notes ==
––
