= Drumtroddan standing stones =

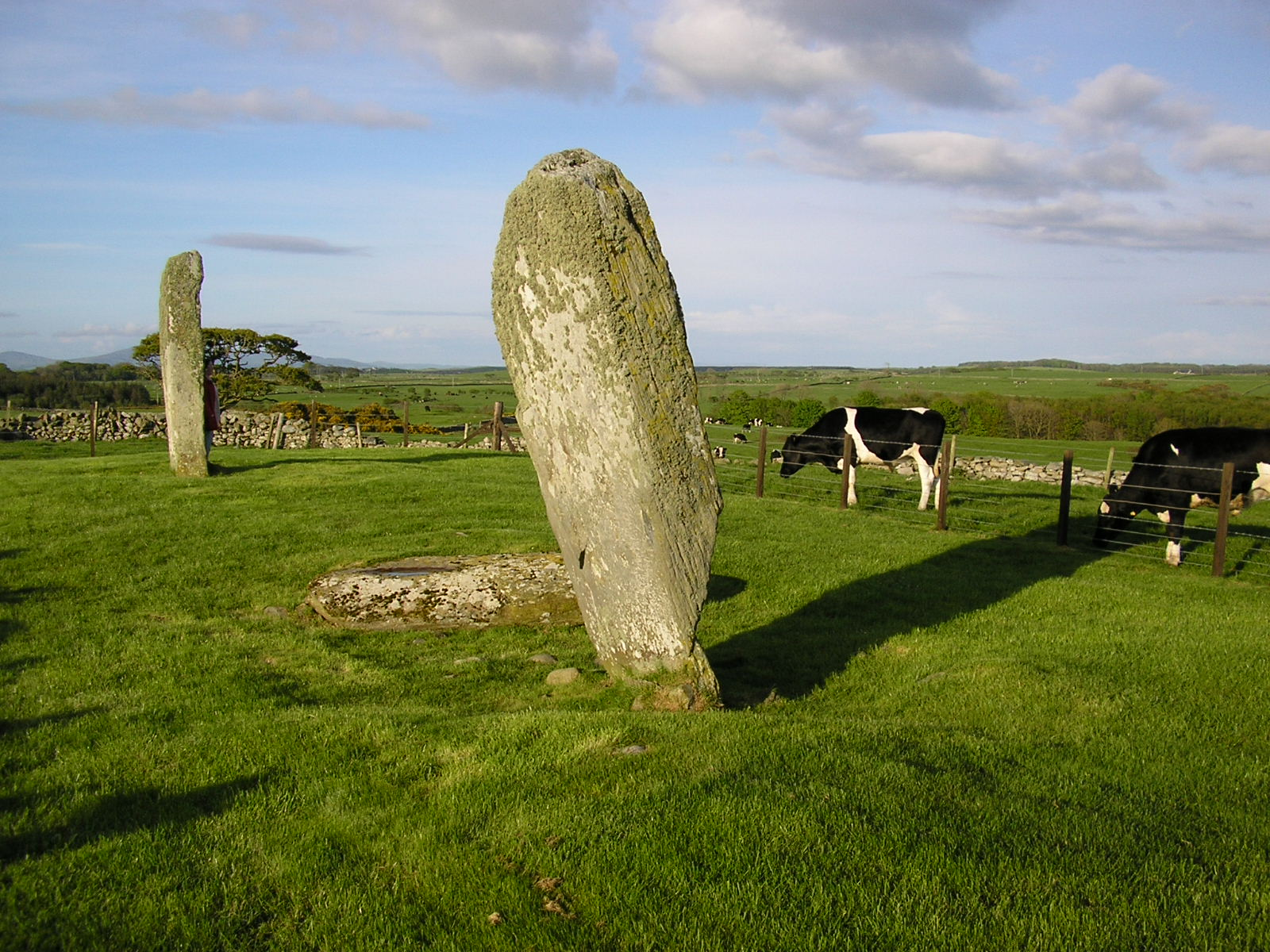
- The site in 2005 before the second stone fell.

- Location within Dumfries and Galloway
- 54.766910°N 4.5437526°W

Scheduled monument
- Designated: 31 December 1921
- Reference no.: SM90102

The Drumtroddan standing stones (grid reference NX 36449 44300) are a small Neolithic or Bronze Age stone alignment in the parish of Mochrum, Wigtownshire, Dumfries and Galloway.

== Etymology ==
Drumtroddan is a Gaelic name meaning 'ridge of the quarrel' from Gaelic druim 'ridge' and trodan 'quarrel, contention'.

== Composition ==
The monument comprises three stones, only one of which is now standing, aligned northeast-southwest. The two end stones are 3m in length; the middle stone is roughly 2.7m long. The stones were likely set up in the 3rd or 2nd millennium BCE but sites of this type are difficult to date. Short stone row alignments are considered to be relatively late constructions; however, the height of the stones in this monument may indicate that it dates from an earlier period.

== Purpose ==
The original purpose of the monument is unclear. It has been suggested that it may have been used in observations of the sun or moon.

== Location ==
Monuments of this type are found in concentrations in south-west Ireland, south-west Scotland, and the western seaboards of Scotland. The standing stones are part of larger landscape of prehistoric sites which includes the nearby Drumtroddan cup and ring marked rocks and the Big Balcraig cup and ring marked rocks.
