= Christopher B. Krebs =

American academic

Christopher B. Krebs is the Gesue and Helen Spogli Professor of Italian Studies, Professor of Classics, and, by courtesy, of German Studies and Comparative Literature Stanford University. Krebs' principal research interests are Greek and Roman Historiography, Latin Lexicography and the Classical tradition.

== Life ==
Christopher B. Krebs studied classics and philosophy at Berlin, Oxford (M. St. 2002) and Kiel (1st Staatsexamen 2000, Ph. D. 2003). He was a lecturer at University College, Oxford before being appointed as Assistant Professor of Classics at Harvard in 2004. While Assistant Professor at Harvard, he was Professeur Invité at the École Normale Supérieure in Paris in 2007 and the APA fellow at the Thesaurus Linguae Latinae in Munich in 2008/09. In 2009 he was appointed Associate Professor of Classics at Harvard before becoming Associate Professor of Classics at Stanford in 2012.

Krebs has written two academic monographs on the reception of Tacitus' Germania; the first, Negotiatio Germaniae: Tacitus’ Germania und Enea Silvio Piccolomini, Giannantonio Campano, Conrad Celtis und Heinrich Bebelm, appeared in 2005 while the second, A Most Dangerous Book: Tacitus’s Germania from the Roman Empire to the Third Reich, was published in 2011, has been translated into seven languages (including German, Spanish and Chinese) and won Phi Beta Kappa society's Christian Gauss Award. In addition, he is co-editor of Time and Narrative in Ancient Historiography: The ‘Plupast’ from Herodotus to Appian, published in 2012, a contributor to the Thesaurus Linguae Latinae and Der Neue Pauly, and the author of over 20 journal articles. He is currently working on a variety of projects which include studies of Caesar, Latin Historiography, Posidonius and Annio di Viterbo.

He has also taught the Stanford Humanities Institute summer course on Rome, which discusses renowned Roman leaders and orators such as Tacitus.

== Works ==
- Negotiatio Germaniae: Tacitus’ Germania und Enea Silvio Piccolomini, Giannantonio Campano, Conrad Celtis und Heinrich Bebel, Hypomnemata 158, Göttingen: Vandenhoeck & Ruprecht, 2005. ISBN 3-525-25257-9
- A Most Dangerous Book: Tacitus’s Germania from the Roman Empire to the Third Reich, New York: W. W. Norton, 2011 ISBN 978-0393342925
- Time and Narrative in Ancient Historiography: The ‘Plupast’ from Herodotus to Appian, Cambridge: Cambridge University Press, 2012 (co-editor with Jonas Grethlein) ISBN 978-1107007406
- The Cambridge Companion to the writings of Julius Caesar, Cambridge: Cambridge University Press, 2018 (co-editor with Luca Grillo) ISBN 978-1107670495
