= Gudmund Schütte =

Danish philologist, historian and writer (1872-1958)

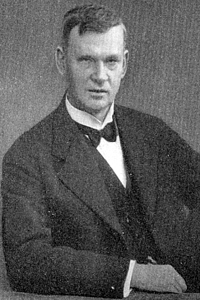
- Born: 17 January 1872; Eskjær, Salling, Denmark
- Died: 12 July 1958 (aged 86); Grinderslev, Skive, Denmark
- Spouse: Elsa Margrethe Sidonie Magdalene Johanna Pichler (m. 1909)
- Awards: Order of the Dannebrog; Dannebrogsmændenes Hæderstegn

Academic background
- Education: University of Copenhagen
- Thesis: Oldsagn om Godtjod (1907)

Academic work
- Discipline: Philology
- Sub-discipline: Germanic philology
- Institutions: Aarhus University

Gudmund Schütte (17 January 1872– 12 July 1958) was a Danish philologist, historian and writer who specialized in Germanic studies.

== Biography ==
Gudmund Schütte was born at Eskjær, Salling, Denmark on 17 January 1872, the son of landowner Theodor Schütte (1835–1915) and Thilia Augusta Marie Cathrine Petersen (1837–96). His paternal grandfather, the landowner August Theodor Schütte, was a German immigrant from Perleberg, Germany. In addition to Eskjær, his father also owned the Bygholm estate, and the Sankt Andrä estate in Austria.

Schütte enrolled at Horsens Statsskole in 1889. While studying German at the University of Copenhagen, Schütte won a university gold medal for a 1897 dissertation on Old English. The same year, Schütte established the Society for Germanic Philology (Danish: Selskabet for germansk filologi). He earned an MA in German philology in 1898, and a PhD in 1907 with the dissertation Oldsagn om Godtjod.

From 1909 to 1913, Schütte lectured at universities in Berlin and at Aarhus University. In 1915, Schütte inheritated the estate of his father. With his financial independence secured, Schütte was free to pursue his scientific pursuits without being affiliated with any university or spending time on lecturing. In subsequent years, Schütte wrote a number of important works on the early culture and history of the Germanic peoples. His magnum opus, The Gothonic Nations (1929–1933), was published in English in two volumes by Cambridge University Press. He also wrote a number of books and articles on Danish history intended for a popular audience.

In addition to his scholarly pursuits, Schütte was an active participant in public debate. He was strongly critical of Pan-German aggression towards Denmark, and advocated Danish reclamation of Danish territory annexed by Germany in the Second Schleswig War. Despite opposition from German scholars, Schütte confirmed conclusively that the Jutlandic dialect is a dialect of Danish. He was forceful advocate not only for the rights of the Danish minority in Germany, but also for several other ethnic minorities and stateless nations in Europe.

Schütte was made a Knight of the Order of the Dannebrog in 1928, and received Dannebrogsmændenes Hæderstegn in 1942. Schütte died in Grinderslev, Denmark on 12 July 1958.

== Personal life ==
Schütte married Elsa Margrethe Sidonie Magdalene Johanna Pichler (1880–1953), in Prague on 21 January 1909. She was Bohemian, the daughter of architect Hans P. Pichler (1830–1908) and Sidonia Moritsch (1854–1936). The two were introduced to each other in Prague while Schütte was visiting the Czech Germanist Arnošt Kraus. Gudmund and Johanna had a close relationship, and her death in 1953 was a heavy blow.

== Selected ==
- Schütte, Gudmund. Primaeval Astronomy in Scandinavia.
- Schütte, Gudmund (1906). Esperanto or English? : II: The case for English.
- Schütte, Gudmund (1913). The cult of Nerthus. p. 15. Archived from the original on 2010-05-30.
- Schütte, Gudmund (1917). Ptolemy's maps of northern Europe : a reconstruction of the prototypes. Royal Danish Geographical Society. p. 184.
- Schütte, Gudmund (1929–33). Our forefathers : The Gothonic nations : A manual of the ethnography of the Gothic, German, Dutch, Anglo-Saxon, Frisian and Scandinavian peoples. University Press.
- Schütte, Gudmund (1945). Die Angeln und ihr Land (in German). Sydslesvigsk Udvalg af 5/5 1945. p. 23.
- Schütte, Gudmund (1952). A ptolemaic riddle solved. p. 168.
- Schütte, Gudmund (1952). Ptolemy's maps and life. p. 168.
- Schütte, Gudmund (1956). Sønderjyllands Modstandssaga : en Gennemgang af den slesvigske Kamp mod tysk Fremtrængen (in Danish). p. 23.

== See also ==
- Birger Nerman
- Sophus Bugge
- Magnus Olsen
- Jan de Vries (philologist)
- Rudolf Much
- Hector Munro Chadwick
- Vilhelm Grønbech

== Sources ==
- Hammerich, L. L. (1959). "Gudmund Schütte" (PDF). Danske Studier (in Danish). Copenhagen: J. H. Schultz Forlag: 107–114. Archived from the original (PDF) on 19 August 2018.
- Larsen, Helge; Kristensen, Marius (11 July 2011). "Gudmund Schütte". Dansk Biografisk Leksikon (in Danish).
