= Germania (book) =

Book by Publius Cornelius Tacitus

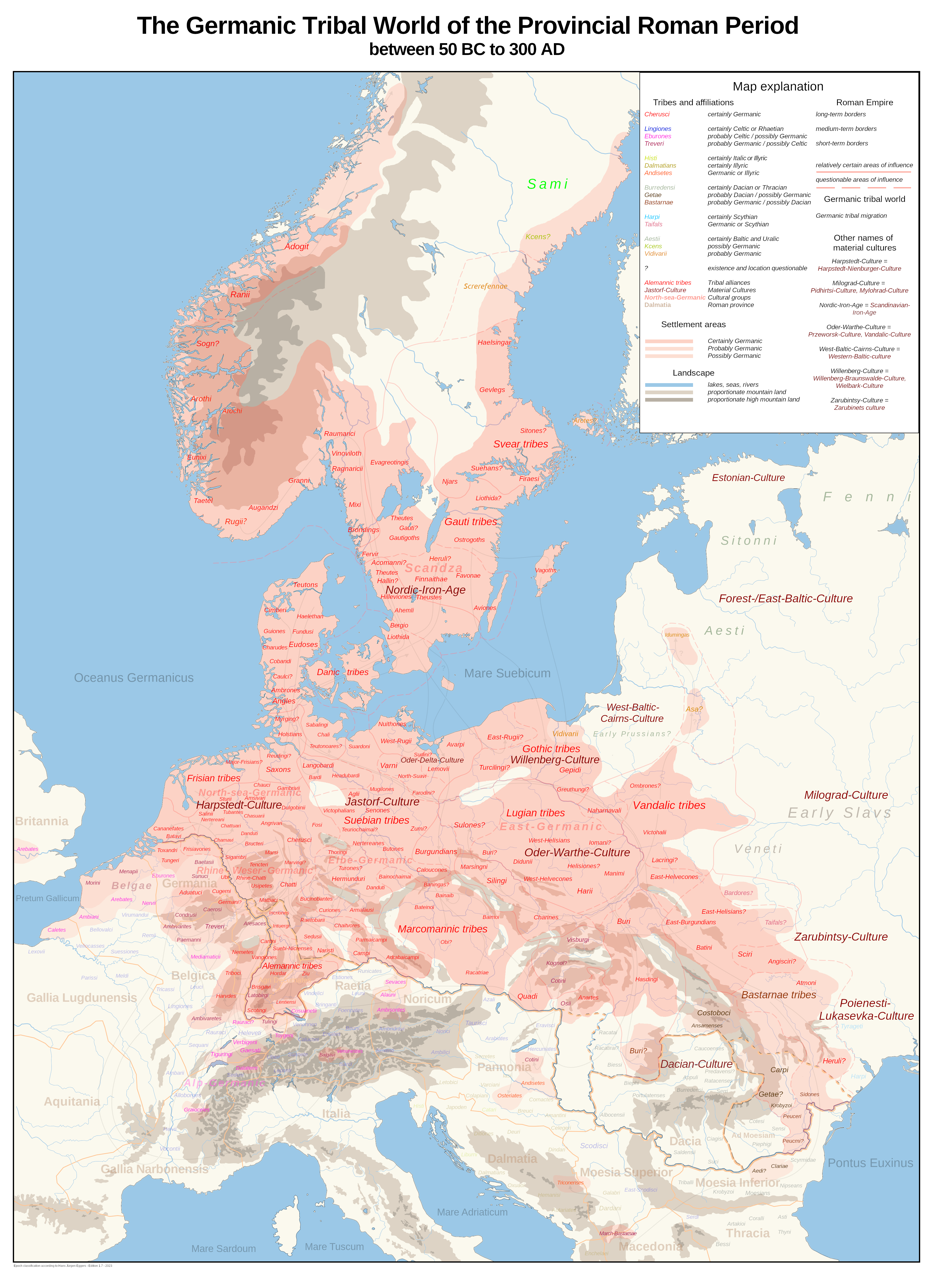
- Map of Germania in the Roman Imperial Period, with the possible locations of some peoples described by Tacitus as Germanic
- Author: Publius Cornelius Tacitus
- Language: Latin
- Published: AD 98
- Publication place: Roman Empire

The Germania, written by the Roman historian Publius Cornelius Tacitus around 98 AD and originally titled On the Origin and Situation of the Germans (Latin: De origine et situ Germanorum), is a historical and ethnographic work on the Germanic peoples outside the Roman Empire.

== Contents ==
The Germania begins with a description of the lands, laws, and customs of the Germanic people (chapters 1–27); it then describes individual peoples, beginning with those dwelling closest to Roman lands and ending on the uttermost shores of the Baltic, among the amber-gathering Aesti, the Fenni, and the unknown peoples beyond them.

Tacitus says (chapter 2) that physically, the Germanic peoples appear to be a distinct nation, not an admixture of their neighbours, since nobody would desire to migrate to a climate as horrid as that of Germania. They are divided into three large branches, the Ingaevones, the Irminones, and the Istaevones, deriving their ancestry from three sons of Mannus, son of Tuisto, their common forefather.

In chapter 4, he mentions that they all have common physical characteristics, blue eyes (truces et caerulei oculi = "sky-coloured, azure, dark blue, dark green"), reddish hair (rutilae comae = "red, golden-red, reddish yellow"), and large bodies, vigorous at the first onset but not tolerant of exhausting labour, tolerant of hunger and cold, but not of heat or thirst.

In chapter 7, Tacitus describes their government and leadership as somewhat merit-based and egalitarian, with leadership by example rather than authority, and punishments are carried out by the priests. He mentions (chapter 8) that the opinions of women are given respect. In chapter 11, Tacitus describes a form of folk assembly rather similar to the public things recorded in later Germanic sources: in these public deliberations, the final decision rests with the men of the group as a whole.

Tacitus further discusses the role of women in chapters 7 and 8, mentioning that they often accompany the men to battle and offer encouragement. He says that the men are often motivated to fight for the women because of an extreme fear of losing them to captivity. Tacitus says (chapter 18) that the Germanic peoples are mainly content with one wife, except for a few political marriages, and specifically and explicitly compares this practice favorably to other cultures. He also records (chapter 19) that adultery is very rare, and that an adulterous woman is shunned afterward by the community regardless of her beauty. In chapter 45, Tacitus mentions that the people to the north of the Germanic peoples, the Sitones, "resemble [the Suevi Scandinavians] in all respects but one - woman is the ruling sex." "This," Tacitus comments, "is the measure of their decline, I will not say below freedom, but even below decent slavery."

== Purpose and sources ==
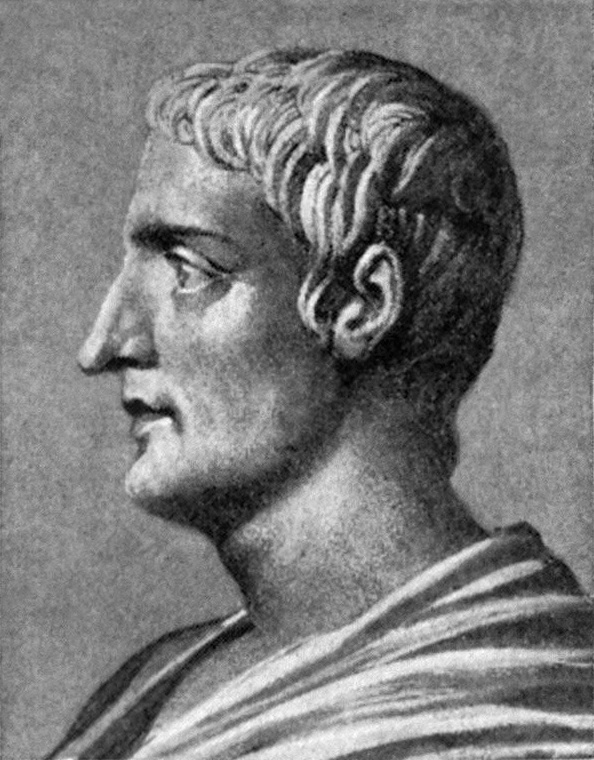
Tacitus (1920 illustration)

Ethnography had a long and distinguished heritage in classical literature, and the Germania fits squarely within the tradition established by authors from Herodotus to Julius Caesar. Tacitus himself had already written a similar—albeit shorter—essay on the lands and peoples of Britannia in his Agricola (chapters 10–13).

Tacitus himself is thought to have never travelled to Germania, thus his information is second-hand at best. Ronald Syme supposed that Tacitus closely copied the lost Bella Germaniae of Pliny the Elder, since the Germania is in some places outdated: in its description of Danubian groups, says Syme, "they are loyal clients of the Empire ... Which is peculiar. The defection of these peoples in the year 89 during Domitian's war against the Dacians modified the whole frontier policy of the Empire." While Pliny may have been the primary source, scholars have identified others; among them are Caesar's Gallic War, Strabo, Diodorus Siculus, Posidonius, Aufidius Bassus, and numerous nonliterary sources, presumably based on interviews with traders and soldiers who had ventured beyond the Rhine and Danube borders, and Germanic mercenaries in Rome.

== Reception ==
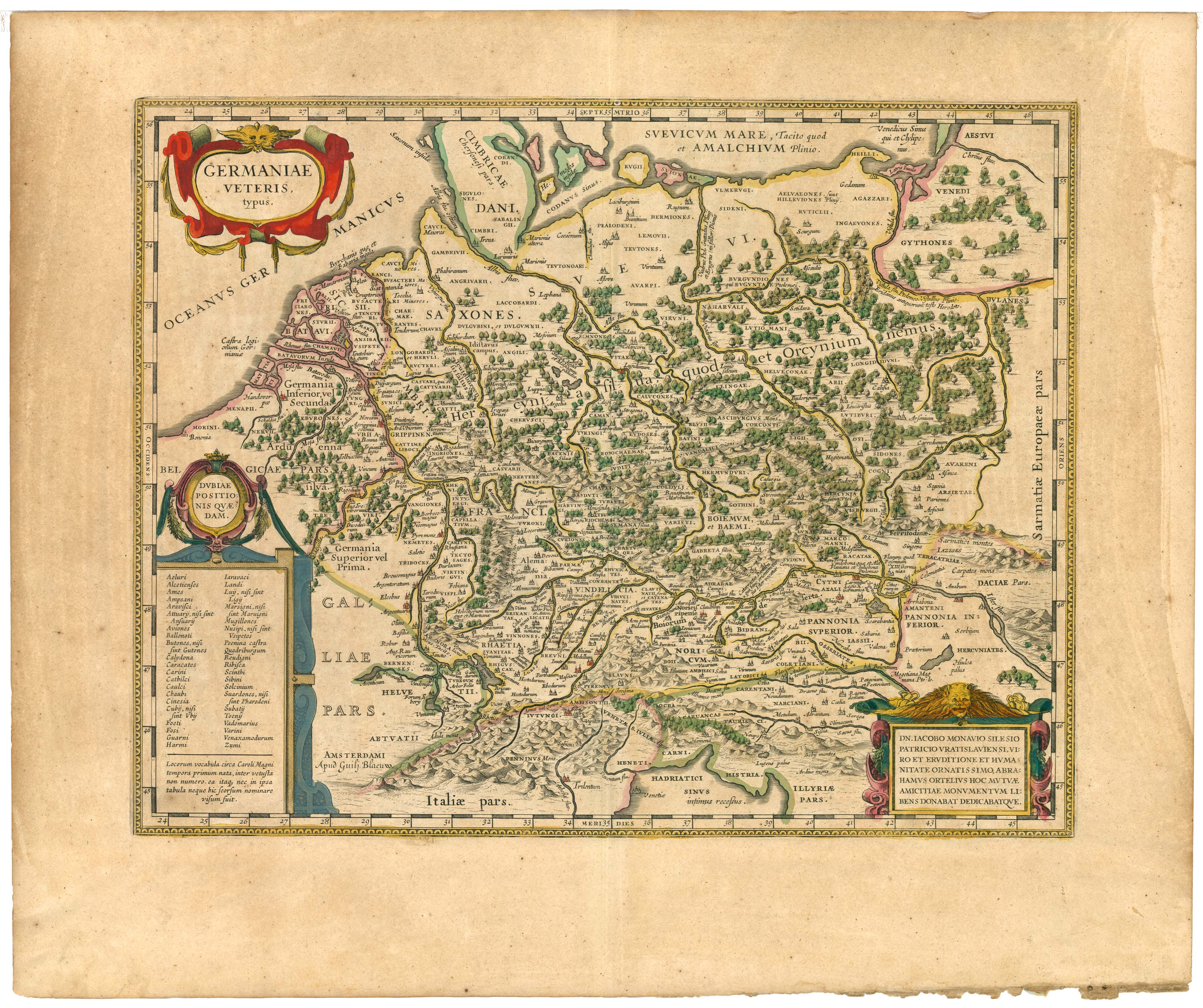
Germaniae veteris typus (Old Germany) edited by Willem and Joan Blaeu), 1645, based on information from Tacitus and Pliny

One of the minor works of Tacitus, Germania was not widely cited or used before the Renaissance. In antiquity, Lucian appears to imitate a sentence from it. It was largely forgotten during the Middle Ages. In the West, it was cited by Cassiodorus in the sixth century and used more extensively by Rudolf of Fulda in the ninth. In the East, it was used by the anonymous author of the Frankish Table of Nations in the early sixth century and possibly by the Emperor Maurice in his Strategikon later that century. In the ninth century, the Frankish Table was incorporated into the Historia Brittonum, which ensured a wide diffusion to at least some of the Germania's information. Guibert of Nogent, writing his autobiography around 1115, quotes Germania.

Germania survives in a single manuscript that was found in Hersfeld Abbey (Codex Hersfeldensis) in 1425. This was brought to Italy, where Enea Silvio Piccolomini, later Pope Pius II, first examined and analyzed the book. This sparked interest among German humanists, including Conrad Celtes, Johannes Aventinus, and Ulrich von Hutten and beyond.

The peoples of medieval Germany (the Kingdom of Germany in the Holy Roman Empire) were heterogenous, separated in distinct kingdoms, such as the Bavarians, Franconians, and Swabians, distinctions which remain evident in the German language and culture after the unification of Germany in 1871 (aside from Austria) and the establishment of modern Austria and Germany. During the medieval period, a self-designation of "Germani" was virtually never used; the name was only revived in 1471, inspired by the rediscovered text of Germania, to invoke the warlike qualities of the ancient Germans in a crusade against the Turks. Ever since its discovery, treatment of the text regarding the culture of the early Germanic peoples in ancient Germany remains strong, especially in German history, philology, and ethnology studies, and to a lesser degree in Scandinavian countries, as well. Beginning in 16th-century German humanism, German interest in Germanic antiquity remained acute throughout the period of Romanticism and nationalism. A scientific angle was introduced with the development of Germanic philology by Jacob Grimm. Because of its influence on the ideologies of Pan-Germanism and Nordicism, Jewish-Italian historian Arnaldo Momigliano in 1956 described Germania and the Iliad as "among the most dangerous books ever written". Christopher Krebs, a professor at Stanford University, claims in a 2012 study that Germania played a major role in the formation of the core concepts of Nazi ideology. The mainstream German reception is much less sensationalist and sees Tacitus's description as more patronizing than laudatory, a predecessor of the classical noble savage concept which started in the 17th and 18th centuries in western European literature.

== Codex Aesinas ==
The Codex Aesinas is believed to be portions of the Codex Hersfeldensis – the lost Germania manuscript brought to Rome from Hersfeld Abbey. It was rediscovered in 1902 by priest-philologist Cesare Annibaldi in the possession of Count Aurelio Balleani of Iesi.

Temporarily transferred to Florence for the controls at the state body of the fine arts, the manuscript was severely damaged during the 1966 flood. It was later restored and brought back to Iesi, and in 1994, the Codex Aesinas was given to the National Library in Rome, catalogued as Cod. Vitt. Em. 1631.

== Editions and translations ==
- Greenwey, Richard (trans.) The Annales of Cornelius Tacitus. The Description of Germanie. 1598.
- Gordon, Thomas. (trans.), before 1750.
- Murphy, Arthur. (trans.), before 1805.
- Church, Alfred John and Brodribb, William Jackson (trans.), 1877.
- Furneaux, Henry (ed.), 1900.
- Anderson, J.G.C., ed. (1938). Germania. Oxford: Clarendon Press.
- Mattingly, H. (trans.) The Agricola and The Germania. Harmondsworth: Penguin, 1948
- Syme, Ronald. (ed.), Tacitus, vol. 1 Oxford: Clarendon Press, 1958
- Önnerfors, Alf. (ed.) De origine et situ Germanorum liber. Teubner, Stuttgart: 1983, ISBN 3-519-01838-1 (P. Cornelii Taciti libri qui supersunt, T. 2,2)
- Rives, J. B. (trans.) Tacitus: Germania. Oxford: 1999

== See also ==
- Category:Early Germanic tribes
- Germanic paganism
- Noble savage
- Regnator omnium deus
