= Elbe Germanic peoples =

Proposed category of peoples speaking dialects ancestral to High German

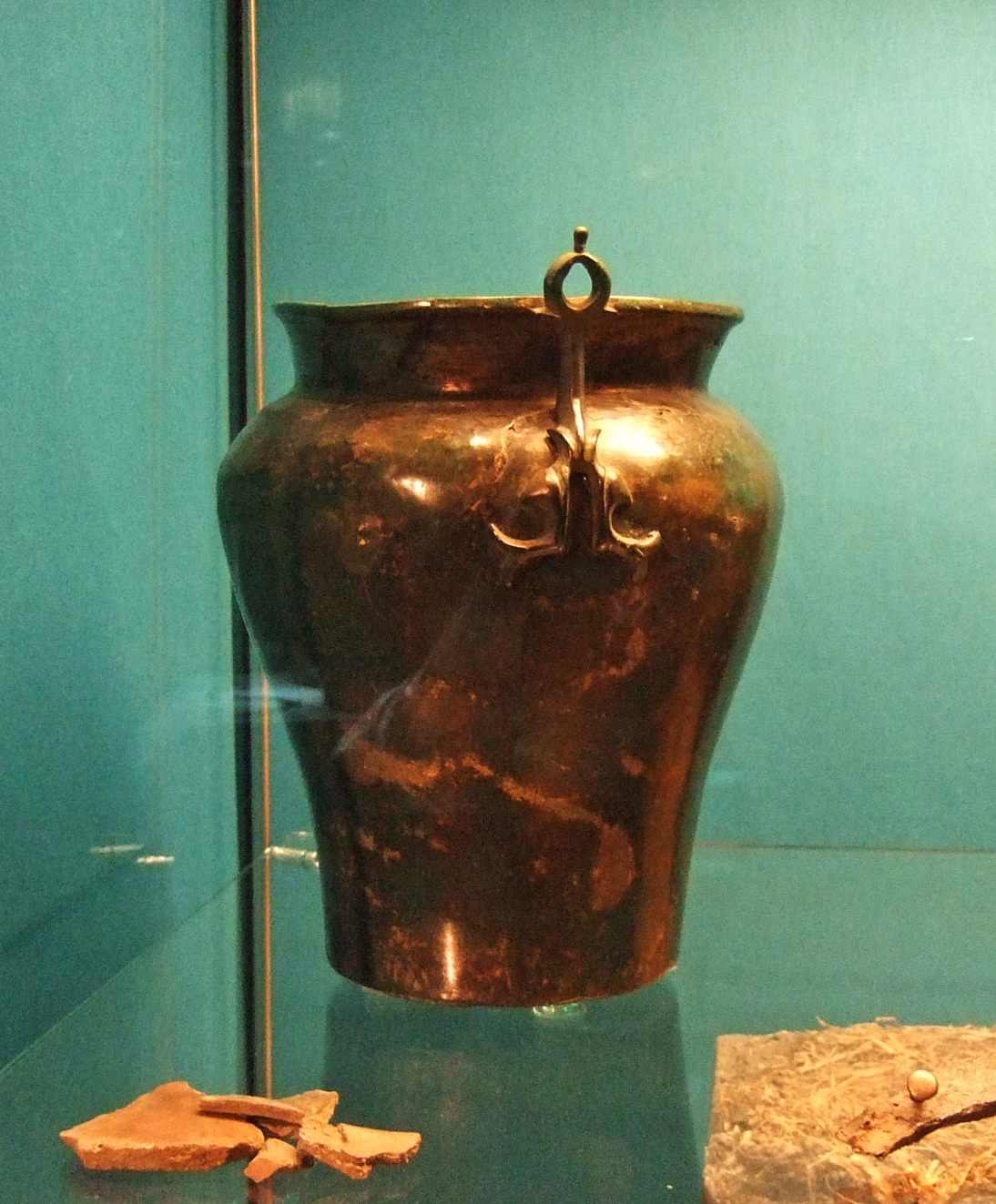
Urn from a large Lombard cremation grave field at Putensen, near Harburg, Germany, from the period of 50-375 AD, belonging to the Elbe Germanic culture. This rare metal urn was probably a Roman import.

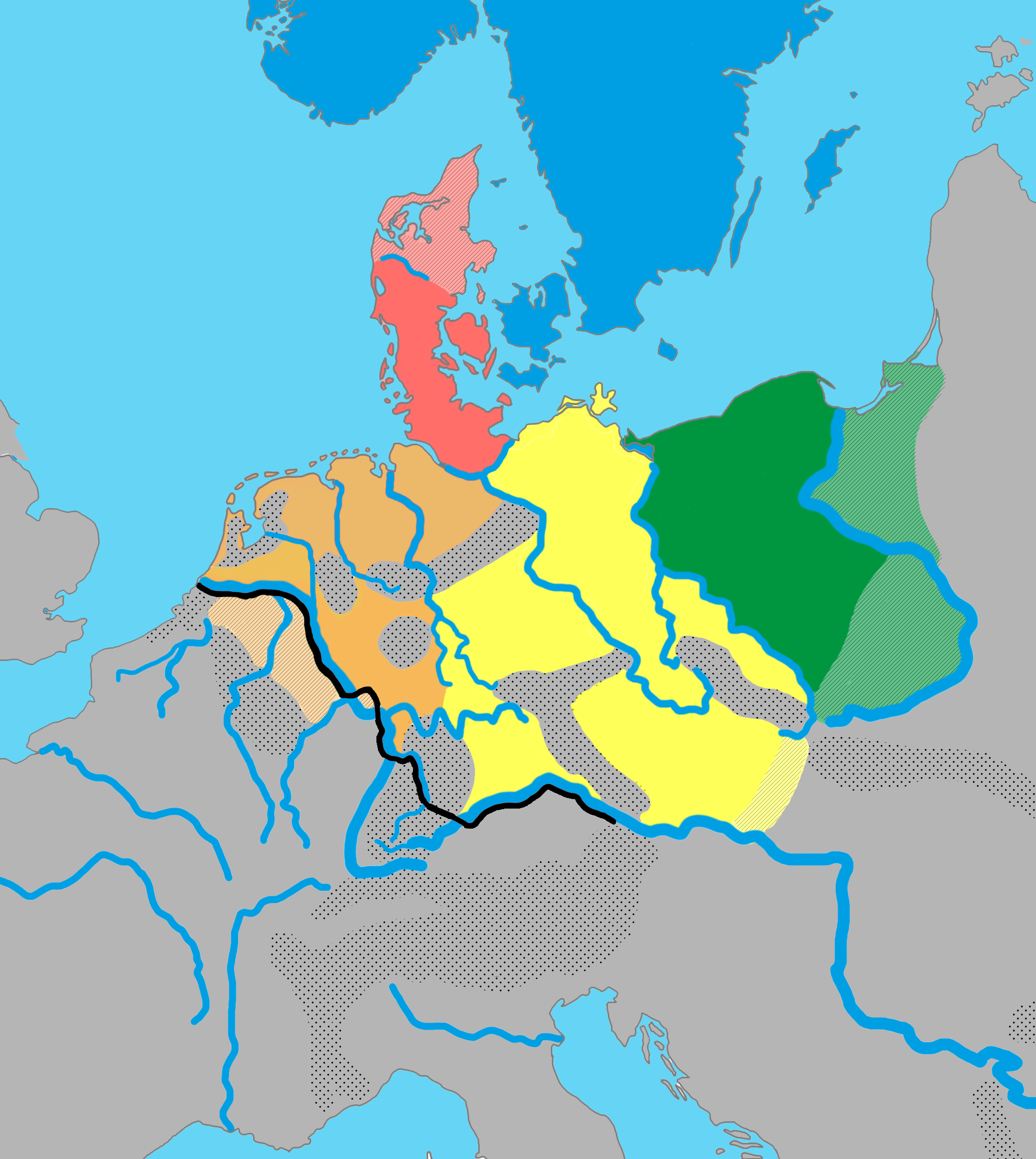
The distribution of the primary Germanic dialect groups in Europe in around AD 1: North Germanic North Sea Germanic, or Ingvaeonic Weser–Rhine Germanic, or Istvaeonic Elbe Germanic, or Irminonic East Germanic

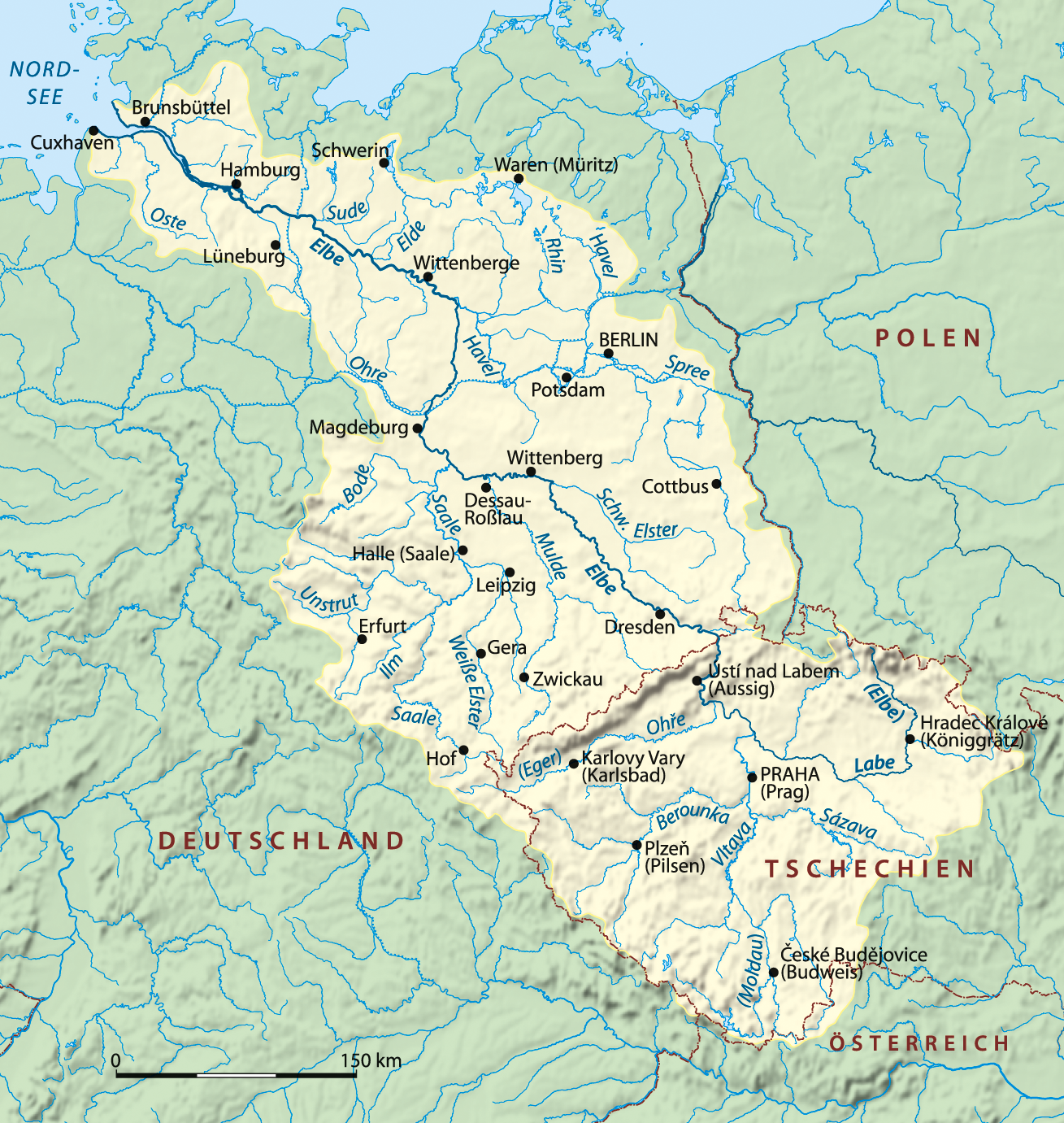
The catchment of the River Elbe

The Elbe Germanic peoples (German: Elbgermanen) are a category of Roman-era Germanic tribes (Latin: Germani) identified through archaeological finds. They originally lived on both side of the Elbe river, in the area where the earlier Jastorf culture is found, but their material culture spread south to the Danube, and west to the Rhine.

The expansion of the Elbe Germanic material culture during the Roman era is generally understood to have involved migrations and conquests which correspond to Roman accounts of the Suebian peoples. In terms of languages, they are believed to have been speakers of an early predecessor of the West Germanic languages.

== Tribal affiliation ==
The Elbe Germans included the tribes of the Semnones, Hermunduri, Quadi, Marcomanni and the Lombards. Historically they are possibly the same as the Irminones or Herminones mentioned by classical authors such as Tacitus, Pliny the Elder and Pomponius Mela. The most notable of these were the Suebic tribes.

All or most of the modern languages thought to derive from the languages of these historical peoples are in the High German group of the West Germanic language family.

By contrast with the settlement areas of the North Sea, Oder-Vistula and Rhine-Weser Germans (from which the Franks descended), there was a relatively uniform development in the economic and social spheres. This can be seen, for example, in the clear consistencies of material and intellectual culture (ceramics, appliances, weapons, jewellery, religious customs, etc.). This was due to the intensive contact between the Elbe Germanic tribes, as well as contact with other, more distant, Germanic tribes.

Links with the Jastorf culture have been made.

Based on the Roman sources, this cultural area was briefly united under Maroboduus (c. 30 BC—AD 37), a Romanized king of the Germanic Suebi.

== History of research ==
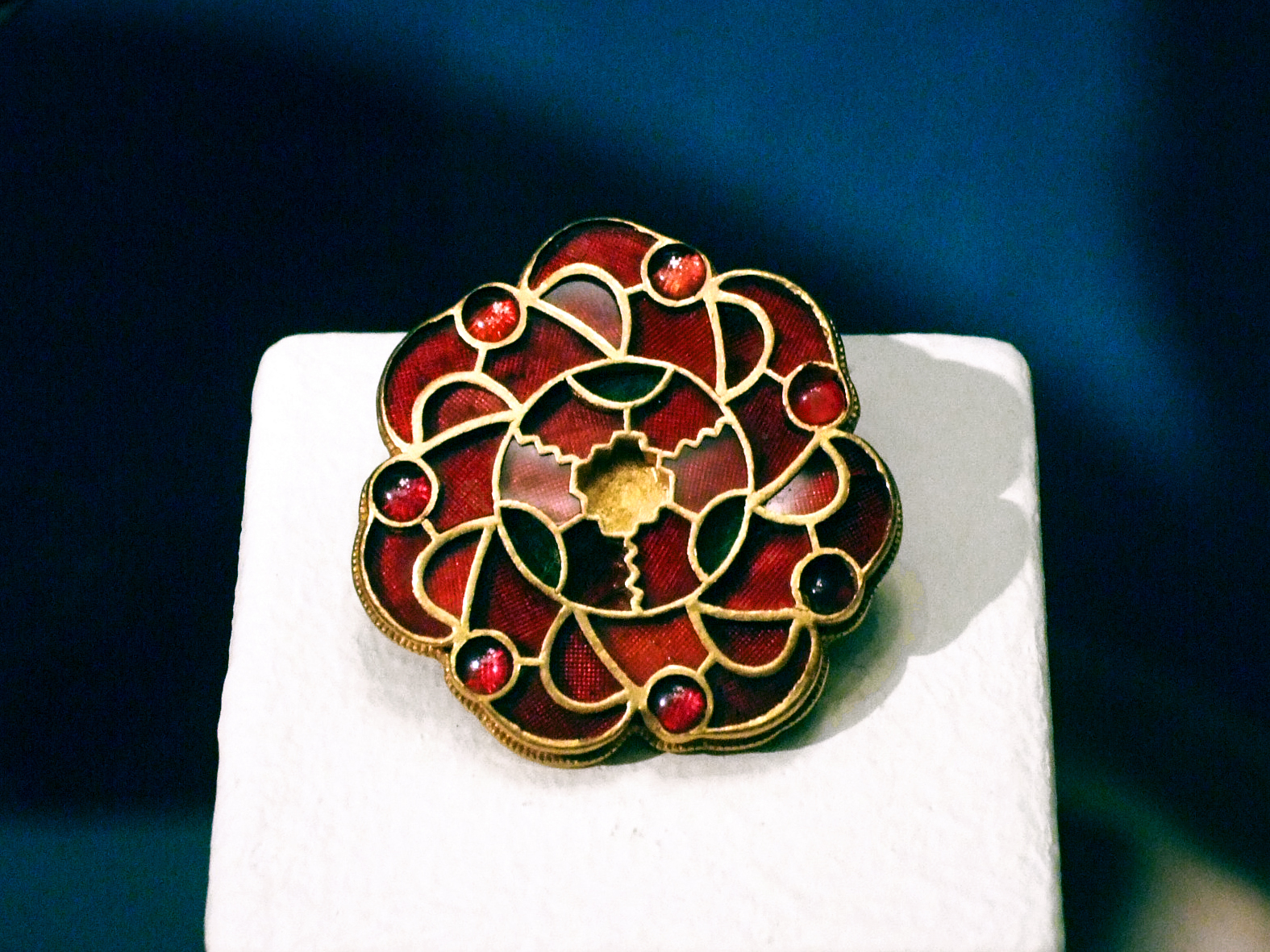
Elbe Germanic disc fibula from Schwanbeck, Mecklenburg-Vorpommern, Germany

The term 'Elbe Germanic' (German: Elbgermanen) was first used in 1868 by Paul Gustav Wislicenus (1847–1917), but it was especially popularized by the German prehistorian de:Walther Matthes in 1931. The term was based initially on partially speculative derivations from ancient Roman sources.

For example, numerous Roman authors mentioned the tribes such as the Suebi and the Irminones, and some other Germanic tribes of the late antiquity on the Danube limes of the Roman Empire.

In the second half of the 20th century, more archeological evidence has emerged. In 1963, the Czech archaeologist Bedřich Svoboda took up the term and postulated an Elbe Germanic connection with the finds in Bohemia and Bavaria, which was later confirmed.

Archaeological finds make it possible to differentiate between the different settlement areas of the Elbe Germanic tribes. There is a northern group around the mouth of the Elbe and in Mecklenburg-Vorpommern, a middle group in central Germany that reaches as far as the Oder, and a southern group in Bohemia, an area that was entirely Elbe-Germanic during the time of the Roman Empire.

Based on the linguistic and archaeological evidence, it is believed that the major Germanic tribes of the Alemanni, Thuringii, and the Bavarii mainly developed from the smaller Suebic groups that were part of the Elbe Germanic peoples.

== Elbe Germanic protolanguage ==
"Elbe Germanic", also called Irminonic, is a term introduced by the German linguist Friedrich Maurer in his 1942 book, Nordgermanen und Alemanen, to describe the unattested proto-language, or dialectal grouping, ancestral to the later Alemannic, Lombardic, Thuringian and Bavarian dialects.

However, Maurer's key proposal, that the Frankish dialects of West Germanic ancestral to Dutch, Franconian and Rhineland German, had a distinct linguistic ancestor from Elbe Germanic dialects, is now largely rejected.

== See also ==
- Irminones
- South Germanic
- Germanic peoples

== Literature ==
- Heinrich Beck, Gerhard Mildenberger: Elbgermanen. In the Lexicon of Germanic Antiquity Studies (Reallexikon der Germanischen Altertumskunde) (RGA). 2nd edition, Vol. 7, Walter de Gruyter, Berlin/New York 1989, p(p). 107–115.
