= South Germanic =

Proposed Language Dialect and Peoples Grouping

South Germanic is a term used for a number of proposed groupings of the Germanic tribes or dialects. However, it is not widely used and has no agreed definition.

== Uses ==
The following uses of the term "South Germanic" are found:

- As a straightforward synonym for West Germanic (generally excluding British Isles). This usage is particularly found in the study of Germanic mythology and culture, where it covers continental German sources in contrast to those from Scandinavia, which are termed North Germanic. However, this usage is also found occasionally in the work of linguists — for example, Stefan Sonderegger. (The East Germanic are generally ignored because there are no pre-Christian texts.)
- As a term in Ernst Schwarz's theory of the Germanic dialects. He divides Germanic into a North Germanic and a South Germanic (or Continental Germanic) group, with the Scandinavian (or Nordic) languages and the extinct East Germanic (Gothic and Crimean Gothic) languages in the former. A feature of his grouping is the intermediate position of two other groups, Elbe Germanic and North Sea Germanic (Anglo-Frisian and Old Saxon), with the latter viewed "floating" being initially part of North Germanic (in the 2nd century BC), but moving closer to the more southerly dialects in the subsequent five centuries. This view has received some support, although a number of those who share Schwarz's view, such as Lehmann, use instead the terms Northeast Germanic (for Schwarz's North Germanic) and Southwest Germanic (for Schwarz's South Germanic).
- As a synonym for High German. This usage seems to be exclusive to Claus Jürgen Hutterer, who groups North Sea Germanic separately from the Weser-Rhine Germanic and Elbe Germanic groups which give rise to (among others) the High German varieties. Although it can be seen as a development of Schwarz's theory, it implies that North Sea Germanic and South Germanic did not form any sort of larger West Germanic grouping. The German term Binnengermanisch (Inland Germanic) is also used informally in a similar sense to distinguish between the coastal West Germanic dialects and the rest, though it does not imply that they are not all part of West Germanic.

== Bibliography ==
- Hutterer, Claus Jürgen (1999). Die germanischen Sprachen. Wiesbaden: Albus. pp. 251–360. ISBN 3-928127-57-8.
- H.L. Kufner, "The grouping and separation of the Germanic languages" in F. van Coetsem & H.L. Kufner (eds.), Toward a Grammar of Proto Germanic (Niemeyer, 1972)
- H. Kuhn, "Zur Gliedering der germanischen Sprachen", in Zeitschrift für deutsches Altertum 86 (1955), 1-47.
- Lehmann, Winfred P. (1966). "The Grouping of the Germanic Languages". In Birnbaum, Henrik; Puhvel, Jaan (eds.). Ancient Indo-European Dialects. Berkeley, Los Angeles: University of California. pp. 13–27.
- Marchand, James M. (2016). "Mythology". In Jeep, John M. (ed.). Medieval Germany: An Encyclopedia. Abingdon, New York: Routledge. pp. 553–555. ISBN 9781138062658.
- Nielsen, Hans Frede (1989). The Germanic Languages. Origins and Early Dialectal Interrelations. Tuscaloosa, London: University of Alabama. ISBN 0-8173-0423-1.
- Schwarz, Ernst (1951). Goten, Nordgermanen, Angelsachsen : Studien zur Ausgliederung der germanischen Sprachen. Bern: Francke.
- Schwarz, Ernst (1956). Germanische Stammeskunde. Heidelberg: Winter.
- Sonderegger, Stefan (1979). Grundzüge deutscher Sprachgeschichte. Vol. I. Berlin, New York: Walter de Gruyter. ISBN 3-11-003570-7.
