= Ingvaeonic nasal spirant law =

Sound change law in some West Germanic languages

In historical linguistics, the Ingvaeonic nasal spirant law (also called the Anglo-Frisian or North Sea Germanic nasal spirant law) is a description of a phonological development that occurred in the Ingvaeonic dialects of the West Germanic languages. This includes Old English, Old Frisian, and Old Saxon, and to a lesser degree Old Dutch (Old Low Franconian).

== Overview ==
The sound change affected sequences of vowel + nasal consonant + fricative consonant. (Spirant is an older term for 'fricative'.) The sequences in question are -ns-, -mf-, and -nþ-, preceded by any vowel. The nasal consonant disappeared, sometimes causing nasalization and compensatory lengthening of the vowel before it. The nasalization disappeared relatively soon after in many dialects along the coast, but it was retained long enough to prevent Anglo-Frisian brightening of /ɑː/ to /æː/. The resulting long nasalized vowel /ɑ̃ː/ was rounded to /oː/ in most languages under various circumstances.

In Old Saxon on the other hand, the nasal consonant is later restored in all but a small handful of forms, so that Old Saxon /fĩːf/ ('five') appears as /fiːf/ in all Middle Low German dialects, while Old Saxon /mũːθ/ ('mouth') appears as /mʊnd/ in all Middle Low German dialects. The Old Saxon words /ɣɑ̃ːs/ ('goose') and /ũːs/ ('us') appear variably with and without a restored consonant, an example being the combination of /ɣoːs/ and /ʊns/ on the Baltic coast.

The sequence -nh- had already undergone a similar change in late Proto-Germanic several hundred years earlier, and affected all Germanic languages, not only the Ingvaeonic subgroup (see Germanic spirant law). The result of this earlier change was the same: a long nasal vowel. However, the nasalization in this earlier case did not cause rounding of nasal /ɑ̃ː/ in Old Saxon, which instead became simple /ɑː/, while the later Ingvaeonic spirant law resulted in /oː/. In Old English and Old Frisian, rounding occurred here as well, giving /oː/ in both cases. It was this earlier shift that created the n/∅ in think/thought and bring/brought.

== Examples ==
Compare the first person plural pronoun "us" in various old Germanic languages:

Gothic uns Old High German uns (dative) or unsih (accusative) Old Dutch uns	Old English ūs Old Frisian ūs Old Saxon ūs (accusative also ūsik)

Gothic represents East Germanic, and its correspondence to German and Standard Dutch shows it retains the more conservative form. The /n/ has disappeared in English, Frisian, Old Saxon (New Low German has both us and uns), and dialectal Dutch with compensatory lengthening of the /u/. This phenomenon is therefore observable throughout the "Ingvaeonic" languages. It does not affect High German, East Germanic or North Germanic.

Likewise:

- Proto-Germanic *tanþs > English tooth, North Frisian tôs, toss (vs. Low German Tähn, Dutch, Danish, and Swedish tand, German Zahn, Icelandic tönn).
- Proto-Germanic *anþeraz > English other, Icelandic aðrir, West Frisian oar, West Flemish (Frans-Vlaams) aajer, Old Saxon ōðar, āthar (vs. Low German anner [nd > nn], German/Dutch ander [þ > d], Icelandic: annað/annar/önnur, Swedish annat/annan/andre/andra, Danish anden/andet/andre).
- Proto-Germanic *gans > English goose, West Frisian goes, guos, Low German Goos (vs. Dutch gans, German Gans).
- Proto-Germanic *fimf > English five, West Frisian fiif, East Frisian fieuw, Dutch vijf, Low German fiew, fiev, fief (vs. German fünf, Icelandic fimm, Danish and Swedish fem).
- Proto-Germanic *samftō, *-ijaz > English soft, West Frisian sêft, Low German sacht [ft > xt], Dutch zacht [ft > xt] (vs. German sanft).

== English ==
English shows the results of the shift consistently throughout its repertoire of native lexemes. One consequence of this is that English has very few words ending in -nth; those that exist must have entered the vocabulary subsequent to the productive period of the nasal spirant law:

- month – derives from Old English monaþ (compare German Monat); the intervening vowel rendered the law inapplicable here.
- tenth – from Middle English tenthe. The original Germanic *tehundô, which was regularised to *tehunþô in early Ingvaeonic, was affected by the law, producing Old English teogoþa, tēoþa (Modern English tithe). But the force of analogy with the cardinal number ten caused Middle English speakers to recreate the regular ordinal and re-insert the nasal consonant.
- plinth – a loanword in Modern English from Greek (πλίνθος 'brick, tile').
- amaranth – a double loanword from Greek ἀμάραντος : amárantos 'undying' + ἄνθος : ánthos 'flower'.

Likewise, the rare occurrences of the combinations -nf-, -mf- and -ns- have similar explanations.

- answer – originally had an intervening stop: Old English andswaru, cf. Dutch antwoord, German Antwort.
- unfair – the prefix un- is still productive.

== Dutch ==
Although Dutch is based mostly on the Hollandic dialects, which in turn were influenced by Frisian, it was also heavily influenced by the Brabantian dialect which tends not to show a shift. As a result, the shift is generally not applied but is still applied to some words. For example, Dutch vijf vs. German fünf, zacht vs. sanft. Coastal dialects of Dutch tend to have more examples, e.g. standard Dutch mond 'mouth' vs. Hollandic mui (earlier muide) "slit between sandbanks where tidal streams flow into". Brabantian dialects tend to have fewer examples, having unshifted examples in a few cases where standard Dutch has the shift, as in the toponyms Zonderwijk (Veldhoven), Zondereigen (Baarle-Hertog), etc. cognate to standard Dutch zuid 'south'.

Met uitzondering van brocht > bracht kan mogelijke invloed van de noordoostelijke dialecten hier niet ingeroepen worden, want die vertoonden ook vrij veel ingweoonse trekken. Gedacht dient te worden aan een gebied zonder ingweoonse kenmerken en in het licht van de immigratiestromen in die tijd ligt dan veeleer Brabantse invloed voor de hand.

Except for brocht > bracht "brought", the possible influence of the northeastern dialects [Low Saxon] cannot be cited as evidence, since they also show quite a lot of ingvaeonic traits. One must instead think of a region without ingvaeonic traits, and given the direction of immigration of that time [into Holland's larger southern cities following the fall of Antwerp in 1585], Brabantine influence is a straightforward explanation.

— Johan Taeldeman, "De opbouw van het AN: meer zuidelijke dan oostelijke impulsen", Tijdschrift voor de Nederlandse Taal- en Letterkunde, volume 123 (2007), issue 2, p. 104.

== German ==
The spirant law was originally active in Central Franconian dialects of High German, which is proof that it was not entirely restricted to Ingvaeonic. Compare for example Luxembourgish eis 'us', Gaus ('goose', now archaic). Modern Standard German is based more on eastern varieties which are not affected by the shift. The standard language does, however, contain a number of Low German borrowings with it. For example Süden ('south', ousting Old High German sundan), or sacht ('soft, gentle', alongside native sanft).

In some High and Highest Alemannic German dialects, there is a similar phenomenon called Staub's law, for example üüs ('us', Standard German uns), füüf ('five', Standard German fünf), or treiche ('drink', Standard German trinken).

== See also ==
- Glossary of sound laws in the Indo-European languages

== Sources ==
- Bremmer, Rolf H. (2009). An Introduction to Old Frisian. History, Grammar, Reader, Glossary. Amsterdam and Philadelphia: John Benjamins Publishing. ISBN 978-90-272-3255-7.
- Markey, Thomas L. Germanic dialect grouping and the position of Ingvæonic.(Inst. f. Sprachwissenschaft d. Univ. Innsbruck, 1976.) ISBN 3-85124-529-6
- Ringe, Donald; Taylor, Ann (2014). The Development of Old English – A Linguistic History of English, vol. II. United States of America: Oxford University Press.
- Ringe, Donald A. (2017). From Proto-Indo-European to Proto-Germanic. Linguistic history of English, v. 1 (2nd ed.). Oxford: Oxford University Press. ISBN 978-0-19-955229-0.
