= Rhine-Weser Germanic peoples =

Roman era archaeological culture between Rhine and Weser

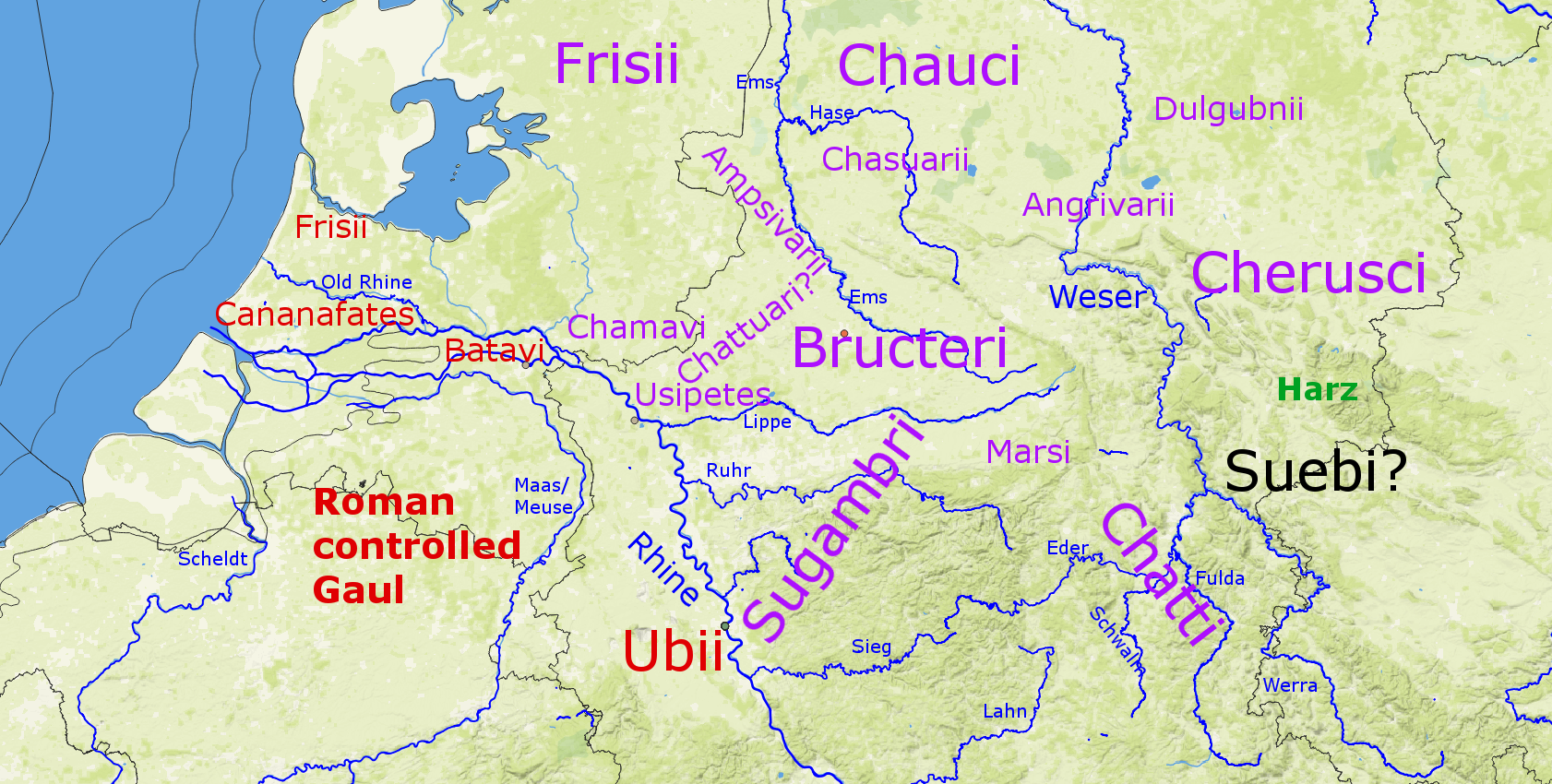
The approximate locations of the Sicambri and Bructeri in about 10 BC

In archaeology, the Rhine-Weser Germanic peoples (German: Rhein-Weser-Germanen) were the Germanic peoples who shared an identifiable set of identifiable technologies and material goods which appeared during the Roman era, and existed in a region encompassed approximately by the Rhine, Weser, Werra and Main rivers in what is now western Germany. Traditionally the changes in this archaeological culture have been associated with the spread of Germanic languages from the Elbe river region to its east, during the period in which the Roman Empire dominated the region from the west.

In archaeology the concept of a Roman era Rhine-Weser zone of related cultures has been influential since 1938, but it has remained difficult to define the limits of this zone, and distinguish them clearly from both their neighbours to the north, east and south, and their precursors. In the early first century AD the region was dominated by the La Tène culture which is associated with Celtic languages in regions to the south and west of the Rhine-Weser region, including pre-Roman Iron Age regions now in France and southern Germany. Evidence of later cultural influences from the Elbe during the Roman era are clear, but they are also clear in neighbouring regions to the north and south.

Scholars have long speculated about the extent to which this archaeological culture can be equated to distinct language groups, or peoples known from historical records, such as the Franks. It has also been proposed, most notably by Friedrich Maurer that there was linguistic and cultural continuity between this Germanic-speaking group and the earlier Istvaeones, who were reported in roughly this region by Pliny the Elder and Tacitus in the 1st century AD. In linguistics, the archaeological concept has led to proposals of a Roman era Weser-Rhine Germanic language, which would be ancestral to later Frankish languages.

== History of the idea ==
Raphael von Uslar originated the concept in a 1938 study, Westgermanische Bodenfunde des 1.-3. Jh. n. Chr. aus Mittel- und W-Deutschland, which aimed to distinguish a West Germanic cultural area distinct from an Elbe-Germanic area to the east, and also from Germanic areas to the north and south. Already von Uslar noted strong “Elbe-Germanic” influences in the earliest period, which could against a clear separation of Elbe-Germanic and Rhine–Weser–Germanic ceramics. More recent research has tended to confirm that the distinctness of Rhine-Weser Germanic ceramic materials increased over time and becomes clear only after about 150 AD.

Germanic archaeological cultures continue to be divided into five provinces: North Germanic, Oder–Vistula Germanic, North Sea Germanic, Elbe Germanic, and Rhine–Weser Germanic. This division is still heavily influenced by the proposals of Friedrich Maurer, who understood archaeological cultural provinces as ethnic units, and regions with distinct languages. Although this equation is no longer widely accepted, archaeology has retained these labels and they are still used on many maps, although scholars express concern that this can easily lead to circular reasoning. On the other hand, it has been convenient to continue to use these terms to refer to rough geographical patterns, even though the geographical boundaries of the Rhine-Weser culture are unclear. Furthermore, attempts to define smaller archaeological provinces are complicated by the fact that there was a lot of overlap between neighbouring Germanic material cultures.

== Interdisciplinary debate ==
Proposals have been made that there was also a Roman-era Weser–Rhine Germanic language or dialect group in this same region, which was clearly distinct from the Germanic languages to the north, south and east. These proposals have partly been based on the idea of a clear Rhine-Weser archaeological culture. Notably, according to such proposals, these dialects would have represented a Frankish language that later evolved into dialects of Dutch and German. However, when the medieval Germanic dialects of what is now Germany, Belgium, Luxembourg and the Netherlands finally appeared in the earliest surviving written records they were in one single relatively continuous "West Germanic" dialect continuum, There is therefore very little linguistic evidence for this position. In 21st century historical linguistics it is commonly agreed that language evidence on its own points to a single West Germanic proto-language, that somehow spread through the whole region between the Rhine and Elbe before the Middle Ages.

In the 20th century Friedrich Maurer made influential proposals which united the interdisciplinary evidence for a Rhine-Weser archaeological region, and a proto-Frankish Germanic language, and a brief 1st-century account by Tacitus which indicated that the early 1st-century Germanic peoples between the Rhine and Elbe divided themselves into three groups: Ingvaeones near the North Sea coast, Istvaeones near the Rhine, and Herminones deeper inland. Even though they probably spoke a Celtic language, Maurer saw the Istvaeones as the precursors of the Roman era Rhine-Elbe archaeological group, and the medieval Franks.

== Biography ==
- Beck, Heinrich (2003), "Rhein-Weser-Germanen § 1. Sprachgeschichtliches", in Beck, Heinrich; Geuenich, Dieter; Steuer, Heiko (eds.), Reallexikon der Germanischen Altertumskunde, vol. 24, De Gruyter, pp. 532–533, doi:10.1515/9783110906141, ISBN 3-11-017163-5
- Maurer, Friedrich (1952) [First edition 1942]. Nordgermanen und Alemannen: Studien zur germanische und frühdeutschen Sprachgeschichte, Stammes- und Volkskunde. Bibliotheca Germanica, 3 (3rd, revised, extended ed.). Bern, Munich: Francke.
- Müller, Rosemarie (2003), "Rhein-Weser-Germanen § 2. Archäologisches", in Beck, Heinrich; Geuenich, Dieter; Steuer, Heiko (eds.), Reallexikon der Germanischen Altertumskunde, vol. 24, De Gruyter, pp. 532–533, doi:10.1515/9783110906141, ISBN 3-11-017163-5
- Steuer, Heiko (2021), Germanen aus Sicht der Archäologie: Neue Thesen zu einem alten Thema, de Gruyter, doi:10.1515/9783110702675
