= North Sea Germanic =

Group of West Germanic languages

- Ingvaeonic
- Geographic distribution: Originally the North Sea coast from Friesland to Jutland; today, worldwide
- Linguistic classification: Indo-European: Germanic; West Germanic; North Sea Germanic
- Subdivisions: Anglo-Frisian; Low German

Language codes
- ISO 639-6: nsea
- Glottolog: nort3175
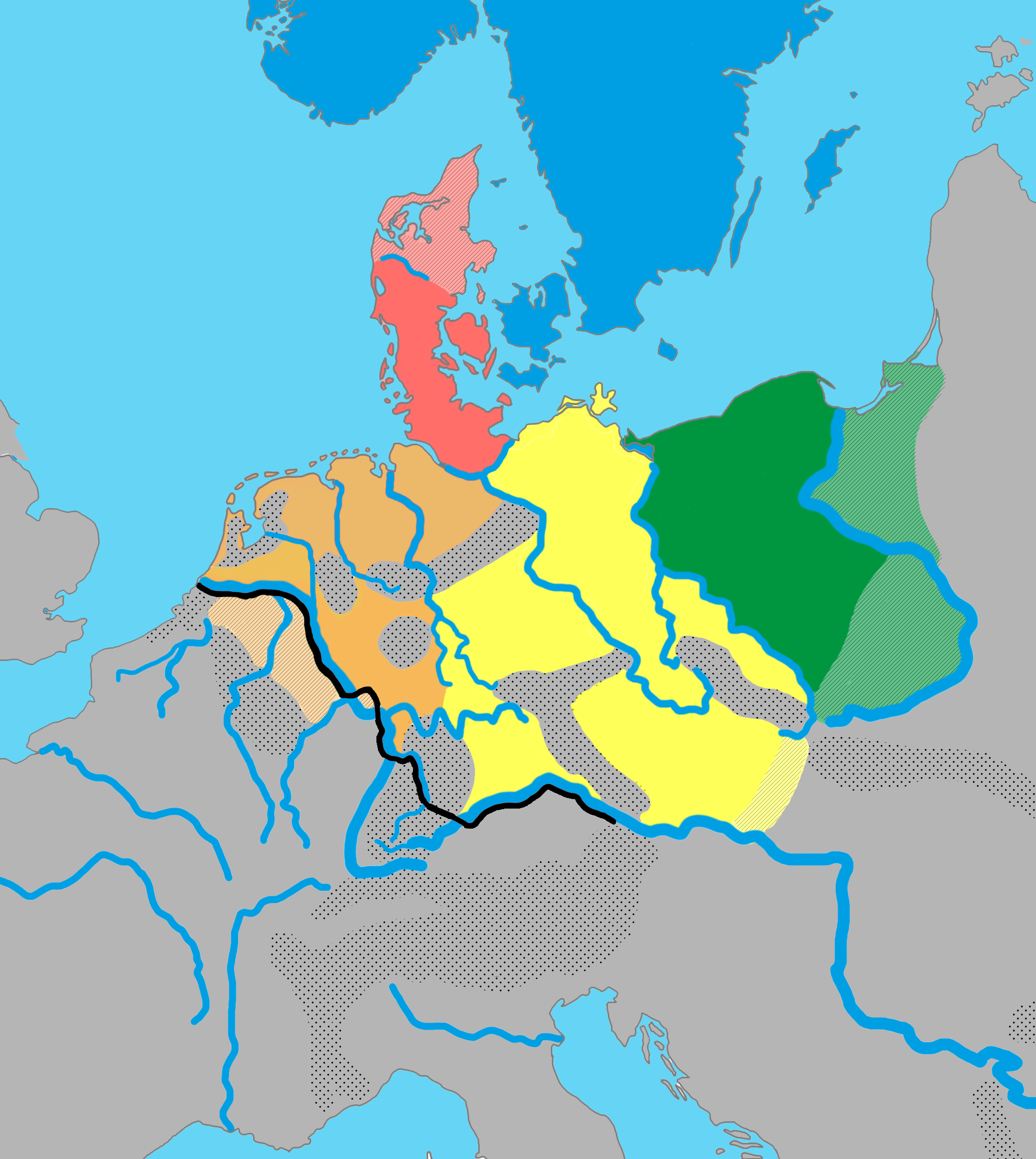
- Friedrich Maurer's proposed division of the Germanic languages in Europe c. AD 1: North Germanic North Sea Germanic, or Ingvaeonic Weser–Rhine Germanic, or Istvaeonic Elbe Germanic, or Irminonic East Germanic †

North Sea Germanic, also known as Ingvaeonic (/ˌɪŋviːˈɒnɪk/ ING-vee-ON-ik), is a subgrouping of West Germanic languages that consists of Old Frisian, Old English, and Old Saxon, and their descendants. These languages share a number of commonalities, such as a single plural ending for all persons of the verb, the Ingvaeonic nasal spirant law, common changes to the Germanic vowel *a, a plural form -as, and a number of other features which make scholars believe they form a distinct group within West Germanic.

It is debated whether the shared features of North Sea Germanic are inherited from a common proto-language or formed through later contact and influence. Additionally, the membership of the group is sometimes debated. Some scholars exclude Low German for lacking a number of features associated with North Sea Germanic. Other scholars include Dutch for sharing some features with the group.

== Name ==
The name Ingvaeonic derives from ancient Roman sources such as Tacitus, who describes a tribal group called the Ingvaeones. In current scholarship, the term "North Sea Germanic" is often preferred, as it is more descriptive of where these languages are spoken and also more neutral as to whether any connection exists to the Ingvaeones. Other names used include "Coastal Germanic" and "North Sea West Germanic."

== Membership ==
The North Sea Germanic languages are usually defined as consisting of the Anglo-Frisian languages (English and Frisian) and Low German. Scholars debate whether these languages shared a single proto-language, or whether their common features are the result of contact and influence—some of them are also shared with the North Germanic languages. Some features may be common inherited features and others are likely areal features.

Examples of the distribution of some early North Sea Germanic sound shifts across Northwestern Germanic according to Norton & Sapp 2021, p. 541
Feature	Old High German	Old Low Franconian	Western Old Saxon	Eastern Old Saxon	Old English	Old Frisian	Old Norse
loss of nasal before a fricative	No	part	Yes	Yes	Yes	Yes	part
aN > oN	No	No	No	Yes	Yes	Yes	No
a > e	No	No	No	part	Yes	Yes	No

The status of Low German in the group is sometimes questioned, but most scholars believe that its oldest attested form, Old Saxon, shows clear North Sea Germanic features. Low German has been steadily influenced by High German, causing it to lose some of its North Sea Germanic features and become a linguistic "hybrid". Other scholars have argued that Old Saxon was always variable and represents a transitional dialect between North Sea Germanic and "Franconian". Much variation between North Sea Germanic and Franconian features in the language is dialectal; generally, eastern dialects show more Ingvaeonic phonetic features whereas western ones show more "Franconian" features.

Some scholars have argued that Dutch belongs to the North Sea Germanic languages, as it shares some characteristics with the others. On the other hand, there are arguments for grouping Old Saxon and Old Low Franconian (the ancestor of Dutch) together, as they also share features that are lacking in Anglo-Frisian. Within Dutch, forms that resemble those of the North Sea Germanic languages are called "Ingvaeonisms". These can be further divided into older Ingvaeonisms, which are found throughout Low Franconian, and younger Ingvaeonisms, which are only found in the coastal areas.

== Characteristic phonetic changes ==
=== lowering of *u ===
Throughout Northwest Germanic (North Germanic and West Germanic), stressed *u lowered to *o when *a was found in the next syllable:

- Proto-West Germanic *fulką > Old Norse, Old Saxon, Old High German folk, Old English folc "troop, tribe"

However, *u was not lowered before a nasal consonant and a following consonant:

- Proto-Germanic *pundą > Old Norse, Old English, Old Saxon pund, Old High German pfunt "pound"

In the North Sea Germanic languages and North Germanic, however, *u was not lowered before a single nasal consonant, whereas in Old High German, lowering occurred:

- Proto-Germanic *numanaz > Old English numen, Old Saxon ginuman, but Old High German ginoman "taken"

Unlowered *u is also found in some other environments in northern West Germanic as opposed to Old High German.

=== Loss of unstressed and syllable final *z ===
All West Germanic languages lost final -z in unstressed final syllables (Proto-Germanic *hundaz > Proto-West Germanic *hund). However, all North Sea Germanic languages and Old Low Franconian also lost syllable-final z in unstressed prefixes, whereas High German retained and rhoticized them, thus Old High German er-bitten vs. Old Saxon a-biddian "to ask for".

In northern West Germanic dialects, Germanic word final -z was also lost in monosyllables and caused compensatory lengthening of the preceding vowel, whereas in southern West Germanic, it became -r:

- Proto-Germanic *hiz > Old English hē, Old Frisian/Old Saxon hī "he" (cf. German er with final r)

This same change is attested for most Low Franconian dialects as well (Dutch hij); in modern Low Franconian, enclitic forms with a final -r are still found in South Low Franconian. Similar enclitic forms are also found in Old Frisian.

=== Ingvaeonic nasal spirant law ===
Old English, Old Frisian, and Old Saxon all share the Ingvaeonic nasal spirant law, in which a nasal is lost before a fricative consonant and the preceding vowel is first nasalized and then lengthened: (Note: Old Norse shows a similar rule, but only before s, e.g. Old Norse oss "us" vs. German uns.)

- Proto-West Germanic *fimf > *fįf > Old English, Old Saxon, Old Frisian fīf "five"
- Proto-West Germanic *gans > *gąs > Old English, Middle Low German, Old Frisian gōs "goose"

Although Old Saxon consistently shows the Ingvaeonic nasal spirant law, Middle Low German dialects restore many nasal consonants lost through the spirant law, giving forms such as ander rather than Old Saxon ōthar ("other"). In some words, the presence or absence of the nasal fluctuates by dialect, with modern West Low German mostly having us ("us") while modern East Low German mostly has uns. Some of these changes may be due to leveling of forms with and without the nasal, while others point to High German influence. High German influence on Low German vocabulary is already visible in the Old Saxon period, as Old Saxon attests words such as kind and urkundeo that do not follow the nasal spirant law.

Low Franconian shows some cases of the nasal spirant law through its whole dialect area, most frequently before f, e.g. vijf "five". Other instances are restricted to coastal dialects, such as mui(den), used for river mouths in place names and cognate with standard Dutch mond "mouth".

Among High German dialects, Central German Ripuarian, Moselle Franconian, and Lorraine Franconian all feature the pronominal form ūs via Ingvaeonic influence. Other n-less forms are also found in these dialects, such as islands where the word Gans lacks an n (e.g. horregeise "wild geese"). Upper Hessian likewise shows gās. However, most cases have been replaced by forms featuring n. The standard German word for south, Süd(en), represents an early expansion of a word featuring the nasal spirant law into High German (Old High German sund vs. North Sea Germanic sûþ).

=== Nasalization and Rounding ===
Throughout North Sea Germanic, *a was nasalized in unstressed positions when before a nasal consonant. Additionally, West Germanic *a became rounded before a nasal when in stressed position:

- Proto-North West Germanic *mānō > Old English/Old Frisian mōna "moon"
- Proto-West Germanic *langaz > Old English/Old Frisian long "long"

Long *ā was more regularly affected than short *a. Many forms in Old English show variants with both a and o, e.g. dranc ~ dronc ("drank").

This change is only occasionally attested in Old Saxon with forms such as hond "hand". Ringe and Taylor suggest that the lack of consistency with which the rule is either applied or not applied in Old Saxon points to High German dialect influence. By Middle Low German, forms with a have come to dominate. However, in cases where the nasal consonant has been lost before a spirant and the o lengthened, the o remained: Middle Low German gōs "goose" (see e.g. modern Eastphalian gous). (Note: The form Gans is found in the East Low German dialects.)

Forms with a > o are also found in Western Dutch dialects of Hollandic, Flemish, and Zealandic in some cases, e.g. sochte "soft" in medieval Flemish (modern standard Dutch zacht). These forms appear connected to the related change in Anglo-Frisian and Old Saxon.

=== Fronting ===
Proto-West Germanic *a was frequently fronted in the ancestor of Old English, less frequently in the ancestor of Old Frisian:

- Proto-West-Germanic dag > Old English dæg, Old Frisian dei "day"

While this change is exceptionless in Old English (all stressed examples of *a became *æ except those that were rounded or nasalized), subsequent developments mean that it is difficult to tell if it was as exceptionless in Old Frisian.

In Old Saxon, the change is only partially attested, producing doublets of words with a/e in Old Saxon. In Middle Low German, most of these doublets were eliminated in favor of the a version. Of the Old Saxon variants glas and gles ("glass") only glas is found in Middle Low German.

Some Dutch dialects also show signs of palatalization of a to e, most often before sp and sk (e.g. modern standard Dutch fles, cf. High German Flasche). This has sometimes been claimed to be an Ingvaeonism, although other factors, such as i-umlaut or analogy, can be used to explain most instances.

=== Palatalization of velars ===
The North Sea Germanic languages show a tendency toward palatalizing velar consonants before front vowels. Old English and Frisian both palatalize the velar consonants k and g before the front vowels i and e in many or all cases:

- Proto-West Germanic *kirika > Old English circe (modern English church), Old Frisian tzierka

Fulk argues that this change occurred early and possibly in Proto-Anglo-Frisian or even Proto-North Sea Germanic, given evidence of palatalization in Old Saxon. Ringe and Taylor, however, argue that Frisian palatalization differs from the Old English pattern, meaning that the two languages likely experienced palatalization as a parallel development.

Palatalization of k and g is also common in Old Saxon and Middle Low German. Palatalized k is indicated in the orthography by ⟨ki⟩ (e.g. kiennen, cf. High German kennen) or in some cases by ⟨z⟩ (e.g. zind, cf. High German Kind), while palatalized g is indicated by ⟨i(j)⟩ or sometimes ⟨gi⟩ (e.g. ielden, cf. High German gelten). The palatalization of /k/ probably occurred over a wide area and to differing amounts in different dialects; in modern Low German, it has in most but not all cases been reversed to k. Outside of many place names, one modern survival is the word sever ("beetle"), still used in many Low German dialects and equivalent to High German Käfer. Earlier ɡ, on the other hand, often alternates with j or is a palatal fricative in modern Low German German dialects, often including in the environment of back vowels.

=== r-metathesis ===
Metathesis of sequence of vowel, /r/, and a following consonant has traditionally been considered a North Sea Germanic trait:

- Proto-West Germanic *brinnen > Old English beornen, Middle Low German bernen, Old Frisian berna "burn"

Metathesis of r clusters can be traced in Old English from the 8th century and infrequently in Old Saxon (hors "horse" vs. Old High German hross) from the 9th century onward. However, metathesis is not frequent in Old Saxon compared to later periods. Among the modern languages it is most frequent in Frisian. From Low German, r-metathesis spread south into the High German area, a process that is seen through the presence of place names with the element -born rather than -bron/brunn(en) "spring".

R-metathesis is also common in Dutch (cf. Dutch bernen "burn"); however, it appears to have begun in the Flemish area in the 11th century and is thus unconnected to the r-metathesis in Old Saxon or Anglo-Frisian.

=== Monophthongization of *au and *ai ===
The monophthongization of the Proto-Germanic diphthongs *au and ai has sometimes been considered a North Sea Germanic trait. A. Campbell regarded the monophthongization of Proto-Germanic au to ā as one of the chief characteristics of the North Sea Germanic languages, though he also noted that Old Saxon instead has the usual outcome ō. However, the reflexes of this diphthong also differs in Old English and Old Frisian: au becomes ēa in most Old English dialects, via an intermediate stage ǣo. ā is thus only attested as an outcome in Old Frisian. ai becomes ā in Old English, but ē (probably æː) in Old Frisian except under certain phonological circumstances where it became ā. Old Saxon again differs, having ē, but forms with reflexes similar to those in Frisian and Old English are also found in some early Old Saxon texts, namely ā and ǣ. Scholars disagree whether Anglo-Frisian originally monophthongized ai to ā, with Frisian later fronting ā to ǣ, or whether both languages underwent separate monophthongizations.

Old Saxon always monophthongizes au and ai to ō and ē, while most Old Low Franconian also does so unless when there was i/j in the following syllable, in which case ai is retained as a diphthong ei. This situation has sometimes been attributed to North Sea Germanic influence. Monophthongization of au and ai forms an important isogloss within Low Franconian between Low German and most Low Franconian on the one hand, and High German and South Low Franconian on the other. In those latter dialects, au and ai were instead raised to ou and ei in most situations. The different dialects thus show the following characteristic differences:

- Proto-Germanic *augō > Old English ēage, Old Frisian āge, Old Saxon/Old Low Franconian ōga "eye"; cf. Old High German ouga
- Proto-Germanic *raipaz > Old Frisian/Old English rāp, Old Saxon rēp (Middle Dutch reep) "band"; cf. Old High German reif

=== i-mutation and syncope of -i after heavy syllables ===
Throughout West Germanic, unstressed final short -i is lost after heavy syllables (those with long vowels or two consonants). In the North Sea Germanic languages, final -i is retained after light syllables, but in Old High German (and Old Norse and Gothic), final -i is always lost (with a few exceptions), irrespective of the weight of the previous syllable. This leads to differences between North Sea German forms such as stedi and more southern stad in different dialects of Old Saxon.

In North Sea Germanic languages, the syncope of final -i occurs after i-mutation (Germanic umlaut), the fronting of vowels before -j/i (e.g. a > e, o > œ, u > y). This leads to forms such as Proto-West-Germanic *gasti > Old English giest, Old Frisian iest vs. Old High German gast without i-mutation. Old Saxon takes an intermediate position between Anglo-Frisian and Old High German and Old Low Franconian: in Eastern dialects, it sometimes shows i-mutation in such cases (e.g. Old West Germanic *krafti > Old Saxon creft "strength [genitive]", Proto-West Germanic *manni > menn "men"). In Western Old Saxon dialects, however, i-mutation is only found when -i has not been syncopated (thus Old Saxon gast "guest" and mann "men", agreeing with Old High German). Additionally, in Old Saxon only short a is affected (as in Old High German and Old Low Franconian), whereas in Anglo-Frisian, long a and long and short o and u are also affected. (Note: High German and Low German - but not Low Franconian - display umlaut of these other vowels in later stages, often after the triggering -i has been lost, meaning that some form of umlaut of these vowels must have developed in earlier stages as well.)

== Shared grammatical characteristics ==
=== Verbs ===
==== Unitary plural ====
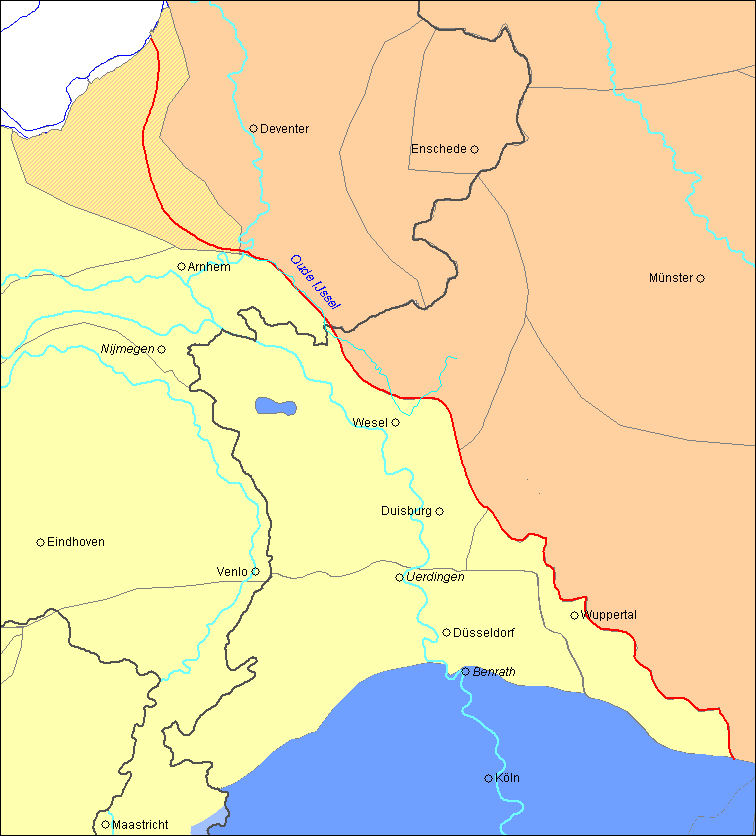
The modern Einheitsplural line (red), dividing Low Saxon/Low German (orange) from Low Franconian (yellow)

North Sea Germanic languages have generalized the 3rd person plural ending to the 1st and 2nd person in all moods and tenses, developing what is called "unitary plural" (German Einheitsplural, Dutch Eenheidspluralis):

- Present indicative: Old High German werdumēs "we become", werdet "you become", werdent "they become" vs. Old English weorþað, Old Frisian werthath, Old Saxon werđađ "we/you/they become"
- Present subjunctive: Old High German werdēm "may we become", werdēt "may you become", werdēn "may they become" vs. Old English weorþen, Old Frisian werthe, Old Saxon werđen "may we/you/they become"

The indicative unitary plural form is generally thought to derive from the nasal spirant law's effect on the older 3rd person plural ending: *-anþ > -*ąþ > -*aþ. This meant that there was very little difference between the third and second person plural ending (originally -*iþ), and led to their merger and then the replacement of the former first person plural ending via leveling.

In continental West Germanic, the presence or absence of the unitary plural is used to determine whether a dialect belongs to Low German/Low Saxon or to Low Franconian. (Note: In many Low Franconian varieties (including standard Dutch), the historical second person plural form has acquired a singular function (e.g. standard Dutch jij maakt 'you (sg.) make'), and a new plural has formed, taking the ending -en. This change has produced a secondary unitary plural that is historically unrelated to the Low Saxon unitary plural.) In Low German, the form of the unitary plural varies by dialect: West Low German retains the indicative ending -(e)t, using it rather than the earlier subjunctive ending -en, whereas East Low German has generalized the subjunctive ending -en to the indicative. Modern Frisian languages likewise maintain a distinct plural ending, but in most varieties it has been reduced to only a vowel. On the other hand, whereas early Middle English still retained a distinct plural ending (-eth, -en, or -es depending on tense and/or dialect), changes in the 14th and 15th centuries resulted in the modern English system without any distinct ending.

==== Class III stative weak verbs ====
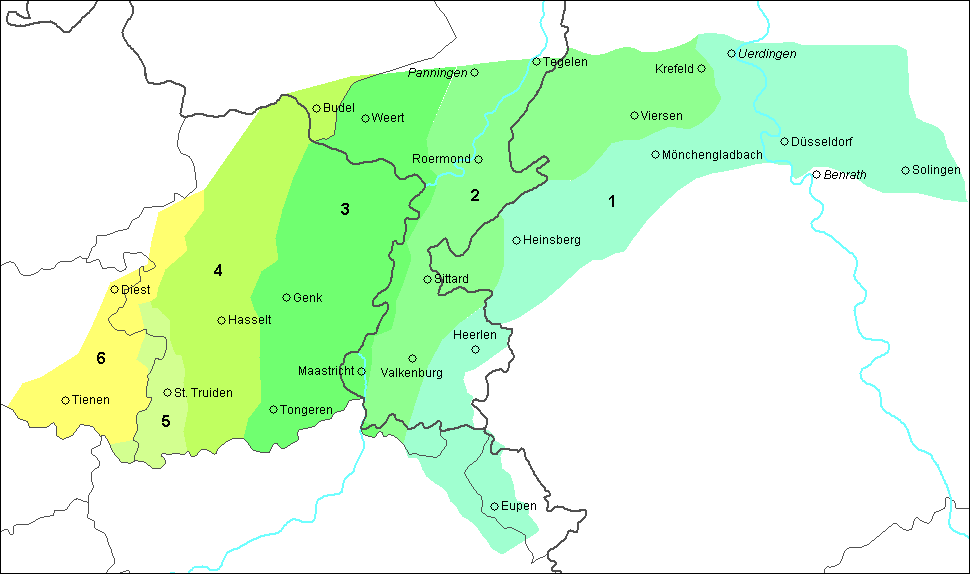
The South Low Franconian dialect area. The East Limburgish–Ripuarian transitional area which features forms of 'have' and 'say' that pattern with High German is labelled "1".

The North Sea Germanic languages have transferred most class III stative weak verbs into class II (-ō-), e.g. Old Saxon ērōn, Old English ārian, vs. Old High German ērēn "to honor", where the class III statives have been maintained but their conjugation simplified. However, the North Sea Germanic languages also retain a relic class of three stative class III Germanic weak verbs, namely 'have' (Old Saxon hebbian), 'say' (Old Saxon seggian) and 'live' (Old Saxon libbian). These feature an alternation in their present stems between a final -ja- and -ē- (< -*ai-). The forms with -j- have undergone West Germanic gemination and Germanic umlaut, whereas those without -j- have not. In High German, however, the alternation has been leveled to -ē- in all forms, and these verbs thus lack umlaut or gemination (habēn, sagēn, lebēn). Low Franconian includes only 'say' (zeggen) and 'have' (hebben) in this class, but not 'live', which patterns with High German as leven. The divide between the High German and the North Sea Germanic forms runs through South Low Franconian and is referred to as the "sagen/seggen-line".

==== Changes to class II weak verbs ====
In the North Sea Germanic languages, class II Germanic weak verbs (with the thematic vowel ō) were altered so that the infinitive, 1st and 2nd person singular, and unitary plural were based on a form -ōj(a)-:

- Proto-West-Germanic *lōkōn > Old Saxon luokoian, Old English lôcian "to look" (-ōj- contracted to -i- in Old English and Old Frisian)

This innovation is always attested in Old English and Old Frisian, but is in competition with the original form in Old Saxon; most likely, Old Saxon originally had the change but it was suppressed under High German influence.

=== Nominals ===
==== Masculine a-stem plurals (plural -s) ====
The North Sea Germanic languages developed a new plural form for the a-stem masculine nouns, -*ōs. This is reconstructable from Old English -as ,Old Saxon -os/-as, and Old Frisian -ar (from a voiced variant -*-ōz with rhoticism). As other West Germanic languages seem to attest a plural ending -ō (< Proto-Germanic -ōz), the precise origins of this new ending are uncertain. Several theories have been advanced, including that it represents a double plural ending -ōsis, that it is a Verner variation of final -*z (attested in the other languages) caused by secondary stress on the ending, and that it is the result of a cliticized demonstrative s- fusing with the ending.

The three North Germanic languages differ in the extent to which the -ōs plural is present. Old English had -ās as the sole pluralization strategy for a-stems, and in the Middle English period, this plural (as -(e)s) would come to replace other regular pluralization strategies. Old Saxon attests variants -os/-as and -a. It appears to have originally only had a plural form -os, but adopted the alternative ending -a under either High German or Low Franconian influence. In the Middle Low German period, -(e)s became rare, but is today the most common strategy of pluralization in Low German. Old Frisian had not only -ar but also variants -a and -an. In Old West Frisian, -ar was replaced by -an/-en over the course of the 13th-15th centuries, but -ar (as -er) remains in East Frisian and in the insular dialects of North Frisian (it was lost in mainland North Frisian).

The origins of the frequent s-plural in modern Dutch are disputed; the ending became common in the Middle Dutch period. In minor Old Low Franconian sources, -as plurals such as nestas ("nests") are attested alongside -a plurals, but it is possible that the s-plurals derive from Frisian, Anglo-Saxon, or even Latin influence on the manuscripts: the main sources in Old Low Franconian only attest -a plurals. It has variously been argued that the frequent -s ending in Middle Dutch originated in language contact with Old French, spreading from the area of Calais into other dialects; that the form originated in coastal dialects and is a native Ingvaeonic feature; or that it originated in eastern dialects under the influence of Old Saxon.

==== s/z-stem plurals (plural -er) ====
The Germanic z-stem originates with the Proto-Indo-European -s stem nouns; in West Germanic the original ending has been lost in the singular and rhoticized to -r in the plural. In Proto-West Germanic and Proto-Germanic, these words formed a very small class of exclusively neuter nouns that were mostly terms for young animals such as *lamb/lamberu "lamb/lambs". In most High German dialects and part of Low Franconian, the ending -eru experienced umlaut of the e to i, giving an Old High German ending -ir that caused i-umlaut (kalb, kelbir "calf, calves") whereas in the other West Germanic languages (including the High German Central Franconian dialects), this did not happen: Old English (West Saxon) cealf, cealfru, Middle Low German, Middle Dutch, Middle Franconian calf, kalvere. The absence of umlaut for this plural can thus be considered a North Sea Germanic feature.

Low German and Dutch experienced an expansion of the number of words that take the -er plural ending during the Middle Ages, with Low German experiencing a further expansion in the early modern period. In most cases, the words that have joined the plural declension are shared with High German. West Low German -er plurals do not show umlaut (e.g. kalver "calves", lammer "lambs"), but East Low German has generally adopted umlauted forms from High German influence. In Dutch, on the other hand, only 15 -er plurals (in the double-plural form -eren) still exist. These plurals do not show umlaut except in South Low Franconian (Limburgish). In West Frisian, the ending was lost entirely during the High Middle Ages; Saterland Frisian has extended the use of the ending to a larger class of nouns, probably partially under Low German influence, whereas other dialects have lost it. English, meanwhile has lost the ending entirely except in the double-plural children.

==== n-stem declension ====
Old Norse, Anglo-Frisian and some Old Saxon forms show a common innovation in the genitive/dative ending for n-stem nouns, agreeing with Old Norse:

- Old English honan, Old Saxon hanan "chicken" (cf. Old Frisian skelta "magistrate") vs. Old High German hanen, -in (cf. Old Low Franconian namin "name"), Old Saxon hanen

In those languages with the innovation, it is assumed that the ending -an was extended from the accusative to the dative/genitive.

Stiles explains the fact that Old Saxon has both forms as the -en ending coming via Old High German influence, whereas Ringe and Taylor argue that the -en form is usual in Old Saxon and that both it and Old High German pattern together in innovating the n-stem declension in a different way than Anglo-Frisian. Kroghe further notes that whereas Anglo-Frisian shows an accusative ending -a(n) for the n-stems, Old High German, Old Low Franconian, and most Old Saxon agree in having an ending -on.

==== Dative plurals ====
North Sea Germanic and the North Germanic languages have reduced the dative plural ending of numerous noun classes to -um/-un, whereas Old High German and Old Low Franconian have retained the older forms:

- Proto-Germanic *-am, *-ōm, *-um, *-im, *-aim > North Sea Germanic and Old Norse -um

==== Strong adjective endings ====
The North Sea Germanic languages and Old Low Franconian have a zero ending for the nominative singular masculine, feminine, and neuter of strong adjectives (Old English/Old Saxon gōd "good"). This is opposed to Old High German, which had optional endings differentiating gender (Old High German guotêr (m.), guotiu (f.), and guotaz (n.) - the neuter ending reflects a Proto-West Germanic -at with the High German consonant shift). Additionally, in North Sea Germanic the neuter plural has no ending, whereas in Old High German, it has an ending -iu. It is unclear whether these endings in Old High German, which agree with Old Norse and Gothic, represent a shared innovation in those languages or whether North Sea Germanic languages have lost the endings.

Beginning in Middle Low German, the masculine strong adjective ending -er is sometimes imported into Low German; additionally, a few neuter pronouns such as allet, "everything", show an equivalent of the High German -az ending, -et: under High German influence, this ending has spread to adjectives as well. Dutch also has some neuter modifiers or pronouns with the ending -et (e.g. allet "everything", dialectal gent "no" (n.)). Additionally, some southern Low Franconian dialects such as Brabantine have an ending -t on some monosyllabic adjectives that could come from the old -at ending (e.g. blaut "blue"); however, as Brabantine-based Middle Dutch records no such endings, it is more likely that they have been influenced by forms of the word oud "old" (pronounced with a final -t). Limburgish South Low Franconian, on the other hand, has an ending -t that is found on some neuter adjectives in predicate and substantivized use and is probably a survival of the original -at ending.

==== Non-feminine dative singular prononimal/adjectival endings ====
In North Sea Germanic, the dative singular strong adjectival and pronominal ending shows a short form ending in -m (Old English þǣm~þām, Old Frisian thām, Old Saxon thēm. This ending is probably via analogy with the corresponding ending in the dative plural (-um). In Old High German, on the other hand, the dative neuter/masculine singular has a final -mu (dëmu). Old Saxon shows both the short and long endings, e.g. OS them ~ themu.

=== Pronouns ===
==== 3rd person pronouns with h- ====
The North Sea Germanic languages and Old Low Franconian share the innovation of using at least some third person singular pronouns that begin with h-, Old Frisian, Old Saxon, Old Low Franconian hī, Old English hē "he" (cf. Old High German er). (Note: Old Norse also has third person pronouns beginning with h-, but with a different second element than the North Sea Germanic languages.) Outside of the nominative masculine singular, however, the degree to which h- has spread throughout the paradigm varies by language. In Old English, all person and numbers feature initial h-, including the creation of a new feminine pronoun heo "she" and a nominative/accusative plural form hī "they". Frisian shows the same extension except that it uses a possessive form sīn for the masculine and neuter singular. In Old Saxon and Old Low Franconian, however, only the masculine nominative features h-: hī, accusative ina "him". (Note: In Dutch, h- has subsequently spread from the masculine subject form hij to the object form hem as well as the feminine/plural object/possessive form haer (attested in Old Low Franconian as iro). Both it and het/hit "it" are attested in Middle Dutch.) Masculine nominative forms with initial h- are also found in the West Central German dialects bordering Low German and Low Franconian, including transitional forms between he and German er such as her.

==== Loss of the 3rd person reflexive pronoun ====
Old English, Old Frisian, Old Saxon, and Old Low Franconian (Old Dutch) have lost the original Proto-Germanic 3rd person reflexive pronoun *sik, instead using the same pronouns to mean, e.g. him and himself. However, the High German reflexive pronoun sich has subsequently been imported into both Low German and standard Dutch. Southwestern, Northwestern, and most Eastern Low Franconian dialects continue to use the same pronoun for both "him" and "himself". English innovated a new reflexive pronoun using -self, whereas Frisian continues to allow the use of the same forms for both personal and reflexive pronouns.

Although they lost the reflexive *sik, Old Low Franconian, Old Frisian, and Old Saxon retained the reflexive possessive adjective sīn in the more general meaning "his", possibly under High German influence. In Old English, sīn is attested in its original meaning "his own", but only rarely.

==== Shared accusative-dative pronominal forms ====
The North Sea Germanic languages and Old Franconian share a tendency to replace the accusative forms of the first and second person singular pronouns with their dative equivalents: Old English mē, ðē, Old Frisian/Old Saxon mī, thī. The same tendency is found in Middle Dutch. (Note: Howe connects the change to the loss of final -z (-r) on the dative pronominal forms, noting that the Scandinavian languages that undergo this change have also generalized the dative form.) The original accusative forms are still attested in their original meaning in the Anglian dialect of Old English. Although the loss of distinct accusative/dative pronouns for the first and second person singular had already occurred in Old Saxon, accusative forms are occasionally attested, and they resurface as general forms for both dative and accusative in some dialects of Middle and New Low German. Versloot and Adamczyk argue that the feature appears to be strongest in dialects along the English channel/southern North Sea (Kentish and West Saxon in Old English, northern Low Saxon, Old Low Franconian, Old Frisian) and weakest in those dialects furthest away (Anglian Old English, Eastphalian Low German).

== Shared vocabulary ==
The North Sea Germanic languages share a number of vocabulary items that are not found in other West Germanic languages. One example is the partial replacement of Proto-Germanic *minni "less" (adverb) with *laisi, which is, however, only attested once in Old Saxon. Additionally, the numerals "nine" and "ten" show a common innovation: Proto-Germanic *newun > *nigun "nine" and Proto-Germanic *tehundō > *tegąþa "ten" (the latter of which has a more limited distribution). Other words that are unique to North Sea Germanic include:

- Old Saxon wilgia, Old English welig, Middle Dutch wilghe, West Frisian wylch "willow"
- Middle Low German blei(er), West Frisian bl(a)ei, Old English blǣge "gudgeon, river goby"
- Low German twi(ge)te, English Midlands dialect twitch(el) "narrow path"
- Old Saxon mapulder, Old English mapuldur "maple"

A number of North Sea Germanic words are also found in the North Germanic languages, such as:

- Old Saxon êld, Old English œld, Old Norse eldr "fire"
- Middle Low German wêl, Old English hweol, Old Frisian fiâ, Old Norse hjól "wheel"
- Middle Low German rôf, Old English hrôf, Old Norse hrôf "roof, cover"

== Sources ==
- Adamczyk, Elżbieta (2022). "Plural inflection in varieties of Dutch: Patterns of restructuring and geographical redistribution". Nederlandse Taalkunde. 27 (3): 394–427. doi:10.5117/NEDtAA2022.3.005.ADAM.
- Van Bree, Cor (2013). "The spectrum of spatial varieties of Dutch: The historical genesis". In Frans Hinskens; Johan Taeldeman (eds.). Dutch. Language and Space: An International Handbook of Linguistic Variation, Volume 3. Berlin: De Gruyter Mouton. pp. 100–128. doi:10.1515/9783110261332.81.
- Van Bree, Cor (2020). Leerboek voor de historische grammatica van het Nederlands - Deel 2: Flexie woordvorming (2 ed.). Universitet Leiden. hdl:1887/87122.
- Burrow, J. A.; Turville-Petre, Thorlac (2005). A Book of Middle English (3 ed.). Blackwell.
- "Ingvaeonic". Collins English Dictionary. HarperCollins. OCLC 1120411289.
- Dingeldein, Heinrich J. (1983). "Spezielle Pluralbildungen in den deutschen Dialekten". In Besch, Werner (ed.). Dialektologie: Ein Handbuch zur deutschen und allgemeinen Dialektforschung. Berlin, New York: De Gruyter. pp. 1196–1202. doi:10.1515/9783110203332-006.
- Euler, Wolfram (2022). Das Westgermanische. Seine Rekonstruktion von der Herausbildung im 3. Jahrhundert bis zur Aufgliederung im 7. Jahrhundert (2 ed.). Verlag Inspiration Unlimited.
- Foerste, William (1957). "Geschichte der niederdeutschen Mundarten". In Wolfgang Stammler (ed.). Deutsche Philologie im Aufriß. Vol. 1 (2nd ed.). Berlin: Erich Schmidt. pp. 1729–1898.
- Frings, Theodor (1916). "Mittelfränkisch-niedererfränkische Studien". Beiträge zur Geschichte der deutschen Sprache und Literatur. 41: 193–271. doi:10.1515/bgsl.1916.1916.41.193.
- Frings, Theodor; Lerchner, Gotthard (1966). Niederländisch und Niederdeutsch: Aufbau und Gliederung des Niederdeutschen. Akademie Verlag. doi:10.1515/9783112701034. ISBN 978-3-11-270103-4.
- Fulk, R. D. (15 September 2018). A Comparative Grammar of the Early Germanic Languages. Studies in Germanic Linguistics. Vol. 3. John Benjamins. doi:10.1075/sigl.3. ISBN 978-90-272-6313-1. S2CID 165765984.
- Gallée, Johan Hendrik (1993). Tiefenbach, Heinrich (ed.). Altsächsische Grammatik: Mit Berichtigungen und Literaturnachträgen. Nach Wendelin Försters letzter Ausgabe in Auswahl bearbeitet und mit Einleitung und Glossar versehen (in German) (3rd ed.). Berlin: Max Niemeyer Verlag. doi:10.1515/9783110920147. ISBN 978-3-484-10681-9. OCLC 30148468. Wikidata Q131582252.
- Harbert, Wayne (2007). The Germanic Languages. Cambridge University Press. ISBN 978-0-521-80825-5.
- Howe, Stephen (1996). The Personal Pronouns in the Germanic Languages: A Study of Personal Pronoun Morphology and Change in the Germanic Languages from the First Records to the Present Day. de Gruyter. doi:10.1515/9783110819205. ISBN 978-3-11-014636-3.
- Kaiser, Livia (2021). Runes Across the North Sea from the Migration Period and Beyond: An Annotated Edition of the Old Frisian Runic Corpus. de Gruyter. doi:10.1515/9783110728224. ISBN 978-3-11-072822-4.
- van Kemenade, Ans (1994). "Old and Middle English". In König, Ekkehard; van der Auwera, Johan (eds.). The Germanic Languages. Routledge. pp. 110–141.
- Klein, Thomas (2013). "Zum r-Plural im Westgermanischen". NOWELE. North-Western European Language Evolution. 66 (2): 169–196. doi:10.1075/nowele.66.2.03kle.
- König, Werner (1994). dtv-Atlas zur deutschen Sprache (10 ed.). Deutscher Taschenbuch Verlag.
- Kroghe, Steffen (2013). "Die Anfänge des Altsächsischen". NOWELE. 66 (2): 141–168. doi:10.1075/nowele.66.2.02kro.
- Krogmann, Willy (1970). "ALTSÄCHSISCH UND MITTELNIEDERDEUTSCH". In Schmitt, Ludwig E. (ed.). Kurzer Grundriß der germanischen Philologie bis 1500. Band 1: Sprachgeschichte. de Gruyter. pp. 211–252. doi:10.1515/9783110822717.211. ISBN 978-3-11-000260-7.
- Krogmann, Willy (1970a). "Altfriesisch". In Schmitt, Ludwig E. (ed.). Kurzer Grundriß der germanischen Philologie bis 1500. Band 1: Sprachgeschichte. de Gruyter. pp. 190–210. doi:10.1515/9783110822717.190. ISBN 978-3-11-000260-7.
- Lasch, Agathe (1974). Mittelniederdeutsche Grammatik (in German) (2nd ed.). Berlin: Max Niemeyer Verlag. doi:10.1515/9783111393124. ISBN 978-3-484-10183-8. LCCN 76472423. OCLC 7350396851. Wikidata Q131582335.
- van Loon, Jozef (2003). "De Chronologie van de R-Metathesis In Het Nederlands En Aangranzende Germaanse Talen". Amsterdamer Beiträge zur älteren Germanistik. 57 (1): 141–167. doi:10.1163/18756719-90000136.
- Nielsen, Hans Frede (1985). Old English and the Continental Germanic Languages: A Survey of Morphological and Phonological Interrelations (2 ed.). Rauchdruck.
- Nielsen, Hans Frede (2001). "Frisian and the Grouping of the Older Germanic Languages". In Munske, Horst Haider; Århammar, Nils; Faltings, Volker F.; Hoekstra, Jarich F.; Vries, Oebele; Walker, Alastair G.H.; Wilts, Ommo (eds.). Handbuch des Friesischen. Niemeyer. pp. 512–523. doi:10.1515/9783110946925.512. ISBN 978-3-484-73048-9.
- Norton, Juliana; Sapp, Christopher D. (2021). "Dialectal Variation in Old Saxon and the Origins of the Hêliand Manuscripts". JEGP, Journal of English and Germanic Philology. 120 (4): 516–544. doi:10.5406/jenglgermphil.120.4.0516.
- Ringe, Donald; Taylor, Ann (2014). The Development of Old English. A Linguistic History of English, vol. II. Oxford University Press.
- Rübekeil, Ludwig (2017). "The dialectology of Germanic". Handbook of Comparative and Historical Indo-European Linguistics. Vol. 2. de Gruyter Mouton. pp. 986–1002. doi:10.1515/9783110523874-013.
- Siebs, Theodor (2019) [1901]. "Geschichte der friesischen Sprache". In Paul, Hermann (ed.). Begriff und Geschichte der germanischen Philologie, Methodenlehre, Schriftkunde, Sprachgeschichte, Namen-, Sach-, und Wortverzeichnis. Grundriß der germanischen Philologie 1 (2 ed.). de Gruyter Mouton. pp. 1152–1433. doi:10.1515/9783111337098-018. ISBN 978-3-11-133709-8.
- Stiles, Patrick V. (1 January 2013). "The Pan-West Germanic Isoglosses and the Subrelationships of West Germanic to Other Branches". NOWELE: North-Western European Language Evolution. 66 (1): 5–38. doi:10.1075/nowele.66.1.02sti. ISSN 0108-8416.
- Stiles, Patrick V. (2017). "The Comparative Method, Internal Reconstruction, Areal Norms and the West Germanic Third Person Pronoun". Amsterdamer Beiträge zur älteren Germanistik. 77 (1–2): 410–441. doi:10.1163/18756719-12340083.
- van der Wal, Marijke J.; Quak, Aad (1994). "Old and Middle Continental Germanic". In König, Ekkehard; van der Auwera, Johan (eds.). The Germanic Languages. Routledge. pp. 72–109.
- de Vaan, Michiel (2017). The Dawn of Dutch: Language contact in the Western Low Countries before 1200. NOWELE Supplement Series. Vol. 30. John Benjamins. doi:10.1075/nss.30. ISBN 978-90-272-0020-4.
- Versloot, Arjen (2016). "Die Endungen -os/-as und -a des Nominativ/Akkusativ Plurals der a-Stämme im Altsächsischen" (PDF). Amsterdamer Beiträge zur älteren Germanistik. 76 (4): 464–477. doi:10.1163/18756719-12340052.
- Versloot, Arjen (2017). "Proto-Germanic ai in North and West Germanic" (PDF). Folia Linguistica. 38 (s38–s1): 281–324. doi:10.1515/flih-2017-0010.
- Versloot, Arjen; Adamczyk, Elżbieta (2017). "The Geography and Dialects of Old Saxon: River-basin communication networks and the distributional patterns of North Sea Germanic features in Old Saxon". In Hines, John; IJssennagger-van der Pluijm, Nelleke (eds.). Frisians and their North Sea Neighbours: From the Fifth Century to the Viking Age (PDF). Boydell and Brewer. pp. 125–148. doi:10.1515/9781787440630-014.
- Voyles, Joseph B. (1971). "The Problem of West Germanic". Folia Linguistica Historica. 5 (1–2): 117–150. doi:10.1515/flin.1969.5.1-2.117.
- Wiesinger, Peter (1983a). "Die Einteilung der deutschen Dialekte". In Besch, Werner (ed.). Dialektologie: Ein Handbuch zur deutschen und allgemeinen Dialektforschung. Berlin, New York: De Gruyter. pp. 807–900. doi:10.1515/9783110203332-003.
- Wolf, Henk (2022) [2013]. "Nordseegermanisch". Wörterbücher zur Sprach- und Kommunikationswissenschaft (WSK) Online. de Gruyter.
- Zhirmunski, Viktor M. (2010). Naidich, Larissa (ed.). Deutsche Mundartkunde. Peter Lang.
