= Heinrich Tiefenbach =

German philologist

- Born: 17 September 1944; Orsoy, Germany
- Died: 15 October 2021 (aged 77); Duisburg, Germany

Academic background
- Education: University of Bonn

Academic work
- Discipline: Germanic studies
- Institutions: University of Regensburg

Heinrich Tiefenbach (17 September 1944 – 15 October 2021) was a German philologist who specialized in Germanic studies

== Biography ==
Heinrich Tiefenbach was born in Orsoy, Germany on 17 September 1944. He received his PhD at the University of Bonn in 1970, and completed his habilitation at the University of Münster in 1984. Until his retirement, Tiefenbach was Professor of German Philology at the Institute for Germanic Studies at the University of Regensburg.

== Selected works ==
- Studien zu Wörtern volkssprachiger Herkunft in karolingischen Königsurkunden. Ein Beitrag zum Wortschatz der Diplome Lothars I. und Lothars II. Dissertation. Wilhelm Fink, München 1973.
- Xanten, Essen, Köln. Untersuchungen zur Nordgrenze des Althochdeutschen an niederrheinischen Personennamen des 9.-11. Jahrhunderts. Habilitationsschrift. Vandenhoeck & Ruprecht, Göttingen 1984.
- Altsächsisches Handwörterbuch = A concise old saxon dictionary. de Gruyter, Berlin/ New York 2010.

== Sources ==
- Kürschners Deutscher Gelehrten-Kalender 2013. Bio- bibliographisches Verzeichnis deutschsprachiger Wissenschaftler der Gegenwart. 1. Teilband, 25. Ausgabe. De Gruyter, Berlin/ Boston 2013, ISBN 978-3-11-027421-9. (Geistes- und Sozialwissenschaften)
- Arend Quak: 'Levensbericht Heinrich Tiefenbach'. In: Jaarboek van de Maatschappij der Nederlandse Letterkunde 2021-2022, pag. 244-250
