= Crimean Gothic =

Gothic language extinct by the 18th century

- Native to: Formerly Crimea
- Ethnicity: Crimean Goths
- Extinct: late 18th century
- Language family: Indo-European: Germanic; East Germanic; Gothic; Crimean Gothic

Language codes
- ISO 639-3: –
- Glottolog: crim1255
- Linguasphere: 52-ADA-a
- IETF: gem-u-sd-ua43

Crimean Gothic was a Germanic, probably East Germanic, language spoken by the Crimean Goths in some isolated locations in Crimea until the late 18th century. Crimea was inhabited by the Goths in Late Antiquity and the Gothic language is known to have been in written use there until at least the mid 9th century CE. However, the exact relation of Crimean Gothic and "Biblical Gothic" is disputed.

Only about a hundred words of the Crimean Gothic language have been preserved, in a letter written by Flemish diplomat Ogier Ghiselin de Busbecq in 1562 and later published in 1589. Various issues such as the fact that Busbecq's source was not a native speaker of Crimean Gothic, that Busbecq recognized the language as Germanic and may have altered some words, and errors made by the printers mean that Busbecq's letter is a flawed source of information. The letter shows various phonological features and words that are clearly of East Germanic origin while also lacking some features typical of Biblical Gothic.

== History ==
Gothic peoples are attested living on Crimea beginning in the 3rd century CE. In 2015, five pieces of Gothic graffiti were identified from the basilica church at Mangup in Crimea; these were written in the Biblical Gothic language and Gothic alphabet and all come from after the mid 9th century, showing that at that time the Biblical Gothic language was still in use, alongside Greek, by the Goths in Crimea. The graffiti possibly show some phonetic developments of Gothic on Crimea (wei- → wi- and -rht- → -rt-), but not necessarily. A 9th-century life of Saint Cyril also mention Goths living on Crimea who used their own language and alphabet in religious services and to read the Bible.

The existence of a Germanic language spoken on Crimea is next mentioned by Fleming William of Rubruck when he visited the area in the 13th century. (Note: "...and there are forty hamlets between Kersona and Soldaia, nearly every one of which has its own language; among them were many Goths, whose language is Teutonic") The Greek historian George Pachymeres, also 13th century, wrote that the Crimean Goths were adopting the Tatar language. However, in the 16th century, Crimean Gothic appears to have still been a vibrant language, with vocabulary in various different fields. Additionally, the primary source of information for Crimean Gothic, the Flemish diplomat Ogier Ghiselin de Busbecq (1562), seems to have wanted to learn about the language because he thought it would be useful. However, two sixteenth-century sources mention the Crimean Goths using Greek and Tatar when communicating with outsiders. This trilingualism may indicate that the language was in decline. The eviction of Christians from the Crimea in 1778 might have played a major role in the extinction. A report by Prussian polymath Peter Simon Pallas from 1794 states that he was unable to find any remnants of the language in Crimea, probably meaning that the language had become extinct by then.

== Corpus ==
The sole longer attestation of Crimean Gothic is the "Fourth Turkish Letter" written by Flemish diplomat Ogier Ghiselin de Busbecq, dated 1562 and first published in 1589. This lists about 80 words and the lyrics of a song. This gives about 101 words. The nature of Busbecq's letter means that the data is problematic: firstly, Busbecq received his information mostly from a native speaker of Greek, meaning that the informant's knowledge of the language and its phonology was likely imperfect; secondly, Busbecq recognized some words as related to Flemish and German and may have written them in ways that reflected that; thirdly, typesetters appear to have made errors with the Crimean Gothic words when the letter was printed (such as writing *schnos as schuos). The only other evidence for Crimean Gothic takes the form of a few personal and place names and a single proposed loanword into Tatar. The nature of this evidence makes definitive statements about Crimean Gothic difficult, with some features simply unknown.

Busbecq recognized the kinship of Crimean Gothic to West Germanic languages, and several words are given in forms that could easily be Dutch or German. He did not recognize many words as Germanic even though they were, such as iel ('health', BGoth. hail) and sch[n]os ('fiancée'). A number of words only correspond to forms found in Biblical Gothic, some of which were unknown at the time that Busbecq was writing, such as menus/me[mi]s 'meat' (Biblical Gothic mimzu), ael 'stone' (Biblical Gothic hallus) and mycha 'sword' (Biblical Gothic mekeis). However, there are differences between the Crimean Gothic and Biblical Gothic vocabulary, for instance rintsch 'mountain' instead of Biblical Gothic bairgahei and broe 'bread' instead of Biblical Gothic hlaifs. The numerals have been heavily influenced by other languages, with two Iranic loanwords, sada ('hundred') and hazer ('thousand'), and the forms for 11–19 likely showing Turkic influence. At least five other words are of non-Germanic origin, and some are of unclear etymology.

== Classification ==
Most scholars classify Crimean Gothic as an East Germanic language. This is due to the presence of phonological features characteristic of or unique to East Germanic (such as Proto-Germanic (PGmc) /jj/→/ddj/), as well as the high proportion of words only attested in Biblical Gothic. However, the apparent lack of some characteristic phonetic mergers found in Biblical Gothic means that Crimean Gothic may not be a direct descendant of that language.

An alternative proposal, last argued by Ottar Grønvik, is that Crimean Gothic is a West Germanic language with a high proportion of East Germanic loanwords. Grønvik relied heavily on the distribution of short vowels in Crimean Gothic to make this conclusion; however, other scholars have argued that these features could have been influenced by Busbecq's own knowledge of his native Flemish and German. Additionally, the sheer number of East Germanic loanwords appears unlikely.

=== Apparent East Germanic features ===
- Lack of rhotacism of PGmc /*z/: CGoth ies ('he'), BGoth is, Old High German er; CGoth wintsch, BGoth winds, vs. Old Norse vindr;
- Retention of PGmc medial /*d/ in CGoth fyder 'four', as in BGoth fidwor/fidur;
- "Sharpening" of PGmc /*jj/ and /*ww/ to /ddj/ and /ggw/ respectively: CGoth ada ('egg'), BGoth *addi, vs. Old High German ei, all from PGmc *ajjaz;
- PGmc /*ē/ does not become /ā/: CGoth mīne ('moon'), BGoth mēna, Old High German māne; CGoth schlipen (to sleep), BGoth slepan vs. Old English slāpan;
- The PGmc. cluster /*lþ/ is maintained rather than becoming /ld/ (West Germanic) or /ll/ (North Germanic): CGoth goltz ('gold'), BGoth gulþ.

=== Features in common with West Germanic ===
- Lack of Biblical Gothic collapse of PGmc /*e/ and /*i/ to /i/: CGoth schuuester, BGoth swistar; CGoth Reghen, BGoth rign;
- Umlaut of PGmc /*u/ to /o/ in CGoth goltz ('gold') BGoth gulþ, Old English gold. Biblical Gothic shows no trace of any umlaut whatsoever.
- PGmc /*u/ may not have become /o/ before /r, h, hw/ as in Biblical Gothic: CGoth thurn ('door'), BGoth daur, Old English duru; but also CGoth kor[n] ('grain'), BGoth kaurn, Old Norse korn, Old English corn.

These features may be influenced by Busbecq's own Flemish dialect, as all the examples are similar to Flemish words.

== Phonology ==
=== Consonant orthography ===
The interference of Busbecq's Greek informant and the orthography of Busbecq's letter makes precise statements about the consonant phonemes of Crimean Gothic difficult.

- ⟨g⟩ and ⟨gh⟩ may have sounded as in Dutch ([ɣ]).
- ⟨h⟩: The words recorded by Busbecq only begin with an h when he recognizes a word as Germanic: CGoth handa ('hand') vs. ieltsch ('living, healthy') = hails. This may indicate that there was no phoneme /h/ in Crimean Gothic.
- ⟨sch⟩ may indicate [s] at the end of a word (as in Flemish at the time), but may indicate [sx] or [ʃ] in other locations.
- ⟨tz⟩ appears to represent [θ], a form of writing the sound also used by Erasmus of Rotterdam.
- consonant ⟨u⟩ and ⟨uu/vv/w⟩ may represent [w] or [v].

=== Vowel orthography ===
- ⟨ie⟩ probably stands for [je] at the beginning of a word (iel, ies), but it is unclear if it is a diphthong inside a word or stands for [i:].
- the values of ⟨oe⟩ and vowel ⟨u⟩ are disputed. They may have had the same values as in Busbecq's Flemish, namely [u:] and [y:] respectively, or they may stand for [o:] and [u:].

=== Other features ===
- Degemination: long consonants appear to be simplified to a single consonant: CGoth ada vs. BGoth *addja, CGoth sune vs. BGoth sunnō; however CGoth brunna matches BGoth brunna;
- The etymologically inconsistent spelling of vowels in unaccented syllables probably indicates vowel reduction, likely to schwa: CGoth boga, Old Norse bogi, Old High German bogo; CGoth ano, BGoth hana;
- the PGmc (and Biblical Gothic) long vowels ē and ō have been raised to i and u respectively: CGoth mine ('moon'), BGoth mēna, CGoth stul ('chair'), BGoth stōls. Misspellings in Biblical Gothic give some evidence for this being a tendency in that language as well;
- Busbecq sometimes (but not usually) records words that begin with Germanic /d/, /b/ as ⟨t⟩ and ⟨p⟩, respectively: CGoth plut 'blood' (BGoth blōþ), CGoth tag (BGoth dags). He also writes devoiced forms of /d/ before -⟨s(ch)⟩ and word-finally: CGoth rintsch (BGoth *rinds), CGoth wingart 'vineyard' (BGoth weinagard) and records final /g/ in /ng/ as /nk/: CGoth rinck 'ring' (BGoth *hriggs).
- Busbecq writes PGmc /*k/ as ⟨ch⟩ after a vowel: CGoth ich ('I') vs. BGoth ik, CGoth mycha ('sword') vs. BGoth mekeis.

== See also ==
- New England (medieval)
