= Friedrich Maurer (linguist) =

German philologist

- Born: 5 January 1898; Lindenfels, Grand Duchy of Hesse, German Empire (now Lindenfels, Hesse, Germany)
- Died: 7 November 1984 (aged 86); Merzhausen, Baden-Württemberg, Federal Republic of Germany

Academic background
- Influences: Otto Behaghel

Academic work
- Main interests: Germanistics
- Notable works: Nordgermanen und Alemannen, Deutsche Wortgeschichte

Maurer's classification of German tribes (German)

Maurer's classification of German tribes (English)

Friedrich Maurer (5 January 1898 – 7 November 1984) was a German philologist who specialized in Germanic studies.

== Biography ==
Maurer started to study classical philology and comparative linguistics at the University of Frankfurt in 1916. The same year, he was drafted, and in 1917, he was gravely injured while he was fighting at the Western Front of World War I, causing him to spend the following period recovering in a military hospital at Heidelberg. After the end of the war, Maurer commenced full-time studies of Germanistics at Heidelberg University (1918) and Giessen (1919), where he also took courses in classical philology and Indo-European studies. Both at Heidelberg and at Giessen, Maurer was a member of the local chapters of the Wingolf.

In 1922, Maurer obtained a doctorate under the supervision of Otto Behaghel, who was to have a lasting influence on Maurer's work. Maurer then obtained a habilitation in German philology in 1925, becoming professor extraordinarius in 1929, still at Giessen, and later professor ordinarius at Erlangen (1931).

Having previously been a member of Der Stahlhelm, Maurer joined the Sturmabteilung after the Nazi party took control of Germany in 1933, but left the organisation in 1935. He joined the Nazi Party in 1937, as well as the National Socialist Teachers League, the National Socialist German Lecturers League and the Nationalsozialistischer Altherrenbund. In the same year, he became a full professor at Freiburg, where he was to chair the Institute for German Philology until retiring in 1966. From 1938/1939, Maurer worked with the Ahnenerbe.

After World War II, the allied military government of Germany called on Maurer, who then founded scientific institutes at the partially-destroyed University of Freiburg and the University of Erlangen. In 1958 and 1959, Maurer chaired the League of German Scholars and cofounded the Institute for the German Language (Institut für Deutsche Sprache, IDS) at Mannheim.

In 1979, Maurer fell gravely ill and had to cease his work. He died in 1984.

== Work ==
Like Behaghel, his thesis supervisor, Maurer directed much attention to the study of dialects (dialectology and dialect geography) and to the comparative linguistics of German. He published numerous works on medieval literature and poetry that were notable for their connections between literature studies, cultural history, prehistoric archaeology and sociology. With Friedrich Stroh, Maurer published Deutsche Wortgeschichte ("History of German Words") in 1943.

Maurer's 1942 linguistic work Nordgermanen und Alemannen ("Northern Germans and Alemanni") is considered his most important one, where he put forth a theory of the development of the Germanic languages that was strongly imbued with nationalist ideology by hypothesizing a strong union of the Germanic peoples in antiquity; a theory that is still controversial. He sought to construct a conception of the West Germanic languages as precursors to Modern German. Against the common division of Germanic into North, East and West Germanic languages, he posited a fivefold division into North Germanic (Scandinavia), North Sea Germanic (Saxon, Frisian etc.), Weser–Rhine Germanic (Cherusci, Chatti, later Franks), Elbe Germanic (Suebi, Marcomanni, Lombards, later Alemanni) and Oder-Weichsel Germanic (Vandals, Burgundians, Goths). The theory was supported mainly by Tacitus and Pliny the Elder and especially the latter's observation in the Natural History of there being Germanorum genera quinque: "five kinds of Germans".

Seeing a connection between supratribal groupings described (though marginally) by the Roman historians Pliny the Elder and Tacitus, he estimated that during a period ranging from roughly 50 BCE to c. 300 CE, five protolanguages (or dialect groups) emerged that included the direct, unattested, predecessors of all (West, North and East) Germanic languages, which have always remained in various degrees of contact.

In the third edition of 1952, Maurer added archaeological evidence to support his classification, most notably citing Rafael von Uslar's article of the same year, "Archäologische Fundgruppen und germanische Stammesgebiete vornehmlich aus der Zeit um Christi Geburt." Maurer equated the five groups of findings discussed in that article with five linguistic groups. His theory has been criticized by later linguists, but they focused mainly on the terms that Maurer used by equating tribes and peoples to language groups and use of nationalistic jargon, which was then considered acceptable. No written evidence of the Germanic languages prior to the 7th century CE exists to prove or to disprove Maurer's thesis.

== Awards ==
- Brüder-Grimm-Preis der Philipps-Universität Marburg, 1963
- Honorary doctorate of the University of Glasgow, 1966
- Jacob-Burckhardt-Preis, 1976
