= Elbe Germanic =

Proposed grouping of West Germanic dialects

- Irminonic, Erminonic
- Geographic distribution: German-speaking Europe
- Ethnicity: Irminones
- Linguistic classification: Indo-European: Germanic; West Germanic; Elbe Germanic
- Proto-language: Proto-Elbe Germanic
- Subdivisions: Upper German

Language codes
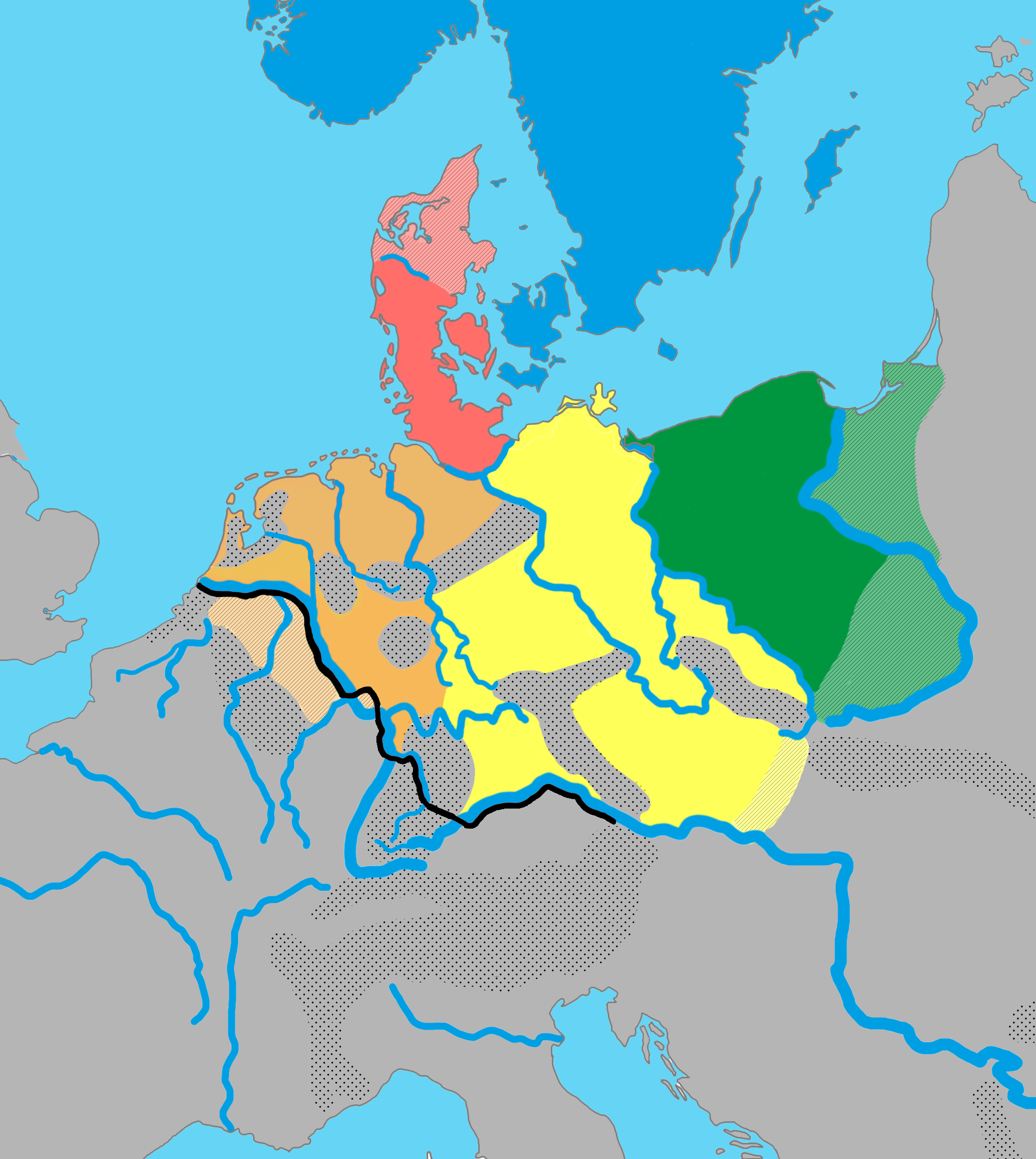
- Friedrich Maurer's proposed division of the Germanic languages in Europe c. AD 1: North Germanic North Sea Germanic, or Ingvaeonic Weser–Rhine Germanic, or Istvaeonic Elbe Germanic, or Irminonic East Germanic †

Elbe Germanic, also called Irminonic or Erminonic, is a proposed subgrouping of West Germanic languages introduced by the German linguist Friedrich Maurer (1898–1984) in his book, Nordgermanen und Alemanen, to describe the West Germanic dialects ancestral to Lombardic, Alemannic, and Bavarian. During late antiquity and the Middle Ages, its supposed descendants had a profound influence on the neighboring West Central German dialects and, later, in the form of Standard German, on the German language as a whole. While most scholars accept the existence of an Elbe Germanic archaeological group, the existence of a linguistic group remains controversial.

== Nomenclature ==
The term Irminonic is derived from the Irminones, a culturo-linguistic grouping of Germanic tribes that was mentioned by Tacitus in his Germania. Pliny the Elder further specified its meaning by claiming that the Irminones lived "in the interior", meaning not close to the Rhine or North Sea. Maurer used Pliny to refer to the dialects spoken by the Suevi, Bavarii, Alemanni and Lombards around the Hercynian Forest and the Northeastern German plain.

== Theory ==
Maurer asserted that the cladistic tree model, which was used ubiquitously in linguistics in the 19th and the early 20th centuries, was too inaccurate to describe the relation between the modern Germanic languages, especially those belonging to its Western branch. Rather than depicting Old English, Old Dutch, Old Saxon, Old Frisian and Old High German to have simply 'branched off' a single common 'Proto-West Germanic', which many previous linguists equated to "Old German / Urdeutsch", he assumed that there had been much more distance between certain dialectal groupings and proto-languages.

Maurer's classification of Germanic dialects

Linguists do not generally support Maurer's theory. Current scholarship is less inclined to propose distinct proto-languages to explain the lack of unity in West Germanic, instead relying on the notion of a dialect continuum. There is no linguistic evidence that separates supposed Weser-Rhine Germanic languages from supposed Elbe Germanic languages. Furthermore, cultural and archaeological groupings do not necessarily correspond to linguistic divisions, and Maurer's theory requires common West Germanic linguistic innovations to be later developments that spread to all West Germanic languages.

== See also ==
- North Sea Germanic
- Weser–Rhine Germanic

== General references ==
- Beck, Heinrich (2003). "Rhein-Weser-Germanen". In Beck, Heinrich; Geuenich, Dieter; Steuer, Heiko (eds.). Reallexikon der Germanischen Altertumskunde. Vol. 24. Berlin: De Gruyter. pp. 532–533. doi:10.1515/9783110906141. ISBN 3-11-017163-5.
- Grimm, Jacob (1835). Deutsche Mythologie (German Mythology); From English released version Grimm's Teutonic Mythology (1888); Available online by Northvegr © 2004–2007:Chapter 15, page 2 Archived 2015-09-22 at the Wayback Machine-; 3 Archived 2015-11-19 at the Wayback Machine. File retrieved 11-18-2015.
- Harm, Volker (2013). ""Elbgermanisch", "Weser-Rhein-Germanisch" und die Grundlagen des Althochdeutschen". NOWELE. 66: 79–99. doi:10.1075/nowele.66.1.05har.
- Seebold, Elmar (2006). "Westgermanische Sprachen". In Beck, Heinrich; Geuenich, Dieter; Steuer, Heiko (eds.). Reallexikon der Germanischen Altertumskunde. Vol. 24. Berlin: De Gruyter. pp. 532–533. ISBN 3-11-017163-5.
- Stiles, Patrick V. (1 January 2013). "The Pan-West Germanic Isoglosses and the Subrelationships of West Germanic to Other Branches". NOWELE: North-Western European Language Evolution. 66 (1): 5–38. doi:10.1075/nowele.66.1.02sti. ISSN 0108-8416.
- Tacitus, Cornelius (2020) [c. 98 CE]. De origine et situ Germanorum (in Latin) – via Wikisource.
- James, Edward (1988). The Franks. The Peoples of Europe. Oxford, UK; Cambridge, Massachusetts: Basil Blackwell. ISBN 0-631-17936-4.
- Gregory of Tours (1997) [1916]. Halsall, Paul (ed.). History of the Franks: Books I–X (Extended Selections). Internet Medieval Sourcebook, Internet History Sourcebooks Project, History Department, Fordham University, New York. Translated by Ernst Brehaut. Columbia University Press.
