= Weser–Rhine Germanic =

Language group

- Rhine–Weser Germanic, Istvaeonic
- Geographic distribution: Around the Weser and Rhine rivers
- Linguistic classification: Indo-European: Germanic; West Germanic; Weser–Rhine Germanic
- Subdivisions: Central German; Low Franconian

Language codes
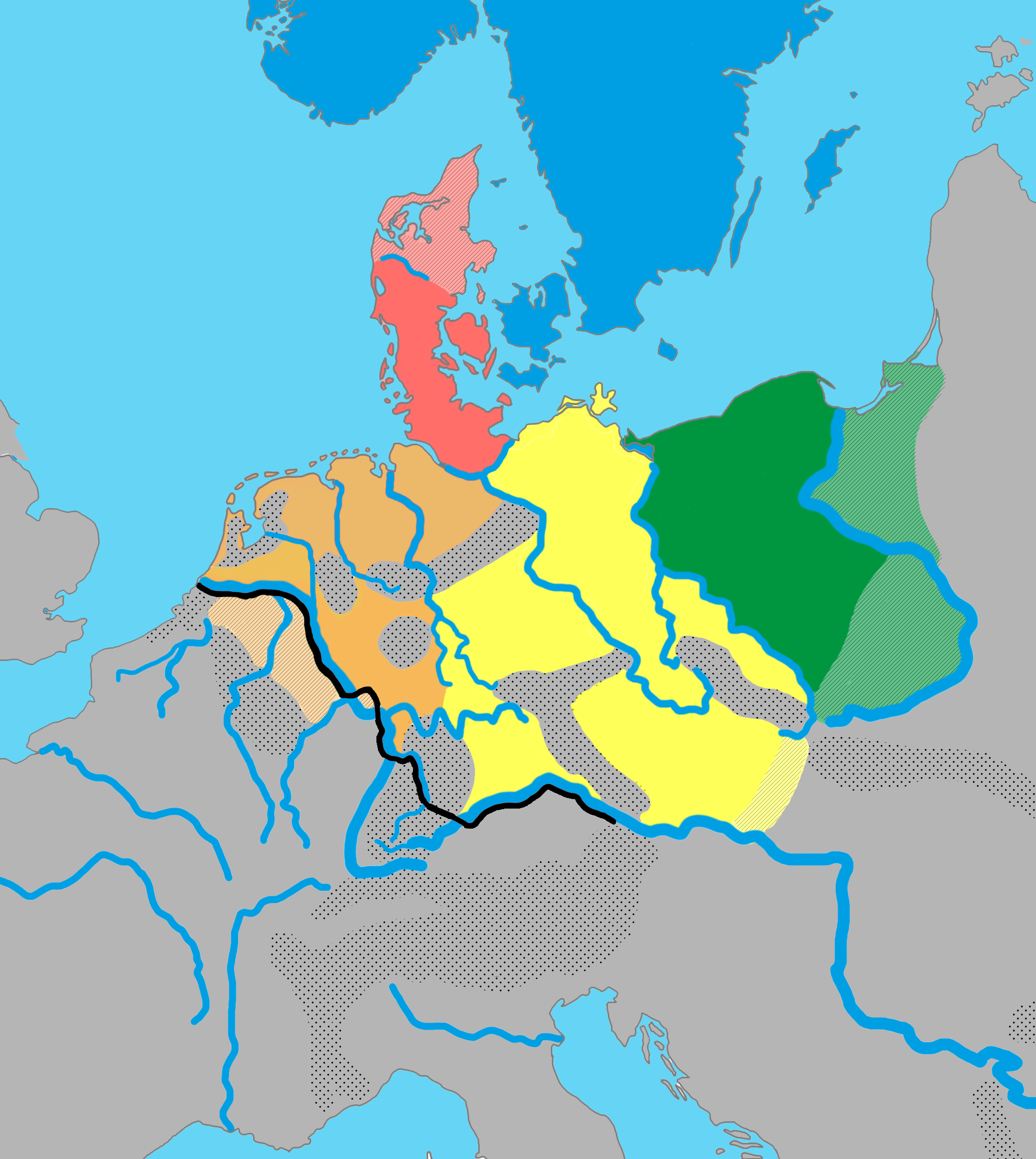
- Friedrich Maurer's proposed division of the Germanic languages in Europe c. AD 1: North Germanic North Sea Germanic, or Ingvaeonic Weser–Rhine Germanic, or Istvaeonic Elbe Germanic, or Irminonic East Germanic †

Weser–Rhine Germanic languages (or Rhine–Weser Germanic, German: Rheinweser-germanisch), sometimes also referred to as Istvaeonic languages, are a proposed Frank-related subgroup of the West Germanic languages which would in terms of modern languages have been ancestral to both the West Central German dialects and Low Franconian/Dutch.

According to original versions of this proposal, introduced by the German linguist Friedrich Maurer (1898-1984), this subgroup descends from a distinct Frankish language, while the related ancestral languages of the so called Elbe Germanic dialects to the south, and North Sea Germanic languages to the north, only subsequently became smoothly connected within the same dialect continuum. Maurer's proposals were influenced not only by linguistic evidence, but also by the Germanic archaeological provinces defined by Raphael von Uslar in 1938, which include the so called Rhine-Weser Germanic peoples, and by early Roman era reports of the Istvaeones – a group of Germanic peoples which lived near the River Rhine, and understood themselves to share a distinct common ancestry, according to their descriptions by Tacitus and Pliny the Elder.

There are no clear linguistic features that distinguish the Weser-Rhine Germanic languages from the Elbe Germanic languages, and Maurer's reliance on non-linguistic data has come into question. As a result, most scholars now doubt the existence of distinct Weser-Rhine Germanic languages.

== Nomenclature ==
The English term "Weser-Rhine" is used as an equivalent to the German term weser-rheingermanisch which was introduced into linguistics by Maurer, or rhein-wesergermanisch, which is influenced by the term now more commonly used by German archaeologists. "Rhine-Weser" is also sometimes used in English. Maurer's term was influenced by the archaeological findings of Raphael von Uslar in 1938, although in the field of archaeology itself Gerhard Mildenburger had already introduced the term rhein-wesergermanisch to refer to what Uslar himself had originally simply called the inland part of the "West Germanic area in the narrower sense". This regionalisation is still commonly used in archaeology, where it is considered convenient, although the idea that it represents a clearly defined cultural area is no longer widely accepted. The maps of Uslar visualized the area being roughly between the Rhine and Weser rivers in what is now Western Germany, stretching north the upper Ems and south to the Main.

The term "Istvaeonic language" (German Istväonisch, Istvaeonisch or Istwäonisch) was part of a tripartite distinction given in Roman sources, which had already being used in linguistics before Maurer. The Istvaeones (or Istaevones) were a group of Germanic peoples mentioned by two Roman authors in the first century AD. Pliny the Elder (c. 23-79 AD) described them in his Natural History as one of five major groupings of Germanic peoples, who lived near the Rhine, and were distinct from the Ingvaeones on the North Sea coast, and the Herminones who lived further inland from the Ingvaeones and Istvaeones. (The other two groups, the Vandili and Peucini, lived east of the Elbe river.) Tacitus (c. 56-120 AD) in his Germania added that these three western groups claimed, on the authority of ancient songs (carmina antiqua), to descend from three sons of a common ancestor named Mannus, who was in turn the son of a god.

== Theory ==
Maurer proposed Weser-Rhine Germanic as part of a three-way division of the languages traditionally recognized West Germanic. According to Maurer, West Germanic did not exist as a subgroup within the Germanic languages: rather West Germanic consists of three distinct dialect groups, with Weser-Rhine Germanic coexisting with North Sea Germanic and Elbe Germanic. According to Maurer, Weser-Rhine Germanic was ancestral to a proposed early Frankish language, and related dialects in Hesse, thus giving rise to the Franconian dialects, including modern Dutch, as well as the Central German dialects. He thus proposed that Central and the Upper German dialects only secondarily became united into a single High German language via the High German consonant shift. This language family effectively joined into the greater West Germanic language continuum, from which the consonant shifts spread. It was proposed that this unification of the languages was encouraged by the political unification of these areas achieved by the Merovingian dynasty.

While some linguists discuss Weser-Rhine Germanic as a subgrouping within the West Germanic languages, linguists do not generally support Maurer's theory. Current scholarship is less inclined to propose distinct proto-languages to explain the lack of unity in West Germanic, instead relying on the notion of a dialect continuum. There is no linguistic evidence that separates supposed Weser-Rhine Germanic languages from supposed Elbe Germanic languages. Furthermore, cultural and archaeological groupings do not necessarily correspond to linguistic divisions, and Maurer's theory requires common West Germanic linguistic innovations to be later developments that spread to all West Germanic languages. Moreover, the large tribal divisions that Maurer assumes for his theory, such as the Franks, Alemanni, etc. do not seem to predate the Migration Period.

== Maurer's methodology ==
Maurer's classification of Germanic dialects

Maurer asserted that the cladistic tree model, ubiquitously used in 19th and early 20th century linguistics, was too inaccurate to describe the relation between the modern Germanic languages, especially those belonging to its Western branch. Rather than depicting Old English, Old Dutch, Old Saxon, Old Frisian and Old High German as having simply 'branched off' from a single common 'Proto-West Germanic', he proposed that there had been much more distance between the languages and the dialects of the Germanic regions. Maurer's approach of drawing linguistic conclusions from non-linguistic evidence was influenced by Gustav Kossinna. He proposed that the Germanic dialects which eventually entered the Rhine-Weser region became a distinct group of dialects spoken by the Franks and Chatti around the northwestern banks of the Rhine, who were presumed to be descendants of the earlier Istvaeones.

== Sources ==
- Beck, Heinrich (2003). "Rhein-Weser-Germanen". In Beck, Heinrich; Geuenich, Dieter; Steuer, Heiko (eds.). Reallexikon der Germanischen Altertumskunde. Vol. 24. Berlin: De Gruyter. pp. 532–533. doi:10.1515/9783110906141. ISBN 3-11-017163-5.
- Braune, Wilhelm; Reiffenstein, Ingo (2004). Althochdeutsche Grammatik (15 ed.). Niemeyer.
- Fulk, R. D. (15 September 2018). A Comparative Grammar of the Early Germanic Languages. Studies in Germanic Linguistics. Vol. 3. John Benjamins. doi:10.1075/sigl.3. ISBN 978-90-272-6313-1. S2CID 165765984.
- Harm, Volker (2013). ""Elbgermanisch", "Weser-Rhein-Germanisch" und die Grundlagen des Althochdeutschen". NOWELE. 66: 79–99. doi:10.1075/nowele.66.1.05har.
- Henriksen, Carol; van der Auwera, Johan (2013) [First published 1994]. "1. The Germanic Languages". In van der Auwera, Johan; König, Ekkehard (eds.). The Germanic Languages. London, New York: Routledge. pp. 1–18. ISBN 978-0-415-05768-4.
- Beck, Heinrich (1989), "Elbgermanen § 6. Sprachliches", in Beck, Heinrich; Geuenich, Dieter; Steuer, Heiko (eds.), Reallexikon der germanischen Altertumskunde, vol. 7 (2 ed.), Walter de Gruyter, ISBN 9783110114454
- Maurer, Friedrich (1952) [First edition 1942]. Nordgermanen und Alemannen: Studien zur germanische und frühdeutschen Sprachgeschichte, Stammes- und Volkskunde. Bibliotheca Germanica, 3 (3rd, revised, extended ed.). Bern, Munich: Francke.
- Mildenberger, Gerhard (2003). "Rhein-Weser-Germanen". In Beck, Heinrich; Geuenich, Dieter; Steuer, Heiko (eds.). Reallexikon der Germanischen Altertumskunde. Vol. 24. Berlin: De Gruyter. pp. 532–533. doi:10.1515/9783110906141. ISBN 3-11-017163-5.
- Müller, Rosemarie (2003), "Rhein-Weser-Germanen § 2. Archäologisches", in Beck, Heinrich; Geuenich, Dieter; Steuer, Heiko (eds.), Reallexikon der Germanischen Altertumskunde, vol. 24, De Gruyter, pp. 532–533, doi:10.1515/9783110906141, ISBN 3-11-017163-5
- Pliny the Elder (2025) [77–79 CE]. "Chapter 28". In Cerrato, Lisa (ed.). The Natural History. Translated by Riley, Henry Thomas; Bostock, John. Medford: Perseus Digital Library.
- Robinson, Orrin W. (1992). Old English and its Closest Relatives: A Survey of the Earliest Germanic Languages. Routledge. ISBN 1134849001.
- Salmons, Joseph (2018). A History of German: What the Past Reveals about Today's Language (2 ed.). Oxford University Press.
- Seebold, Elmar (2006). "Westgermanische Sprachen". In Beck, Heinrich; Geuenich, Dieter; Steuer, Heiko (eds.). Reallexikon der Germanischen Altertumskunde. Vol. 24. Berlin: De Gruyter. pp. 532–533. ISBN 3-11-017163-5.
- Sonderegger, Stefan (1979). Grundzüge deutscher Sprachgeschichte. Vol. I. Berlin, New York: Walter de Gruyter. ISBN 3-11-003570-7.
- Stiles, Patrick V. (1 January 2013). "The Pan-West Germanic Isoglosses and the Subrelationships of West Germanic to Other Branches". NOWELE: North-Western European Language Evolution. 66 (1): 5–38. doi:10.1075/nowele.66.1.02sti. ISSN 0108-8416.
- Wells, C. J. (1987). German: A Linguistic History to 1945. Oxford University Press. ISBN 0-19-815809-2. LCCN 84016611. OCLC 11091161. OL 10138252M.

Ancient sources:

- Tacitus, Cornelius (2020) [c. 98 CE]. De origine et situ Germanorum (in Latin) – via Wikisource.
- Tacitus, Cornelius (2025) [c. 98 CE]. "Chapter 2". In Cerrato, Lisa (ed.). Complete Works of Tacitus. Translated by Church, Alfred John; Brodribb, William Jackson. Medford: Perseus Digital Library.

== See also ==
- North Sea Germanic
- Elbe Germanic
