= East Germanic languages =

Group of extinct Indo-European languages in the Germanic family

East Germanic
- Oder-Vistula Germanic, Eastern Rim Germanic
- Geographic distribution: Varying depending on time (4th–18th centuries), currently all languages are extinct Until late 4th century: Central and Eastern Europe (as far as Crimea) late 4th–early 10th centuries: Much of southern, western, southeastern, and eastern Europe (as far as Crimea) and North Africa early 10th–late 18th centuries — disputed (cp. Crimean Gothic): Isolated areas in Eastern Europe (as far as Crimea)
- Linguistic classification: Indo-European: Germanic; East Germanic
- Subdivisions: Gothic †; Vandalic †; ? Burgundian †; ? Herulian †; ? Skirian †

Language codes
- ISO 639-5: gme
- Glottolog: east2805
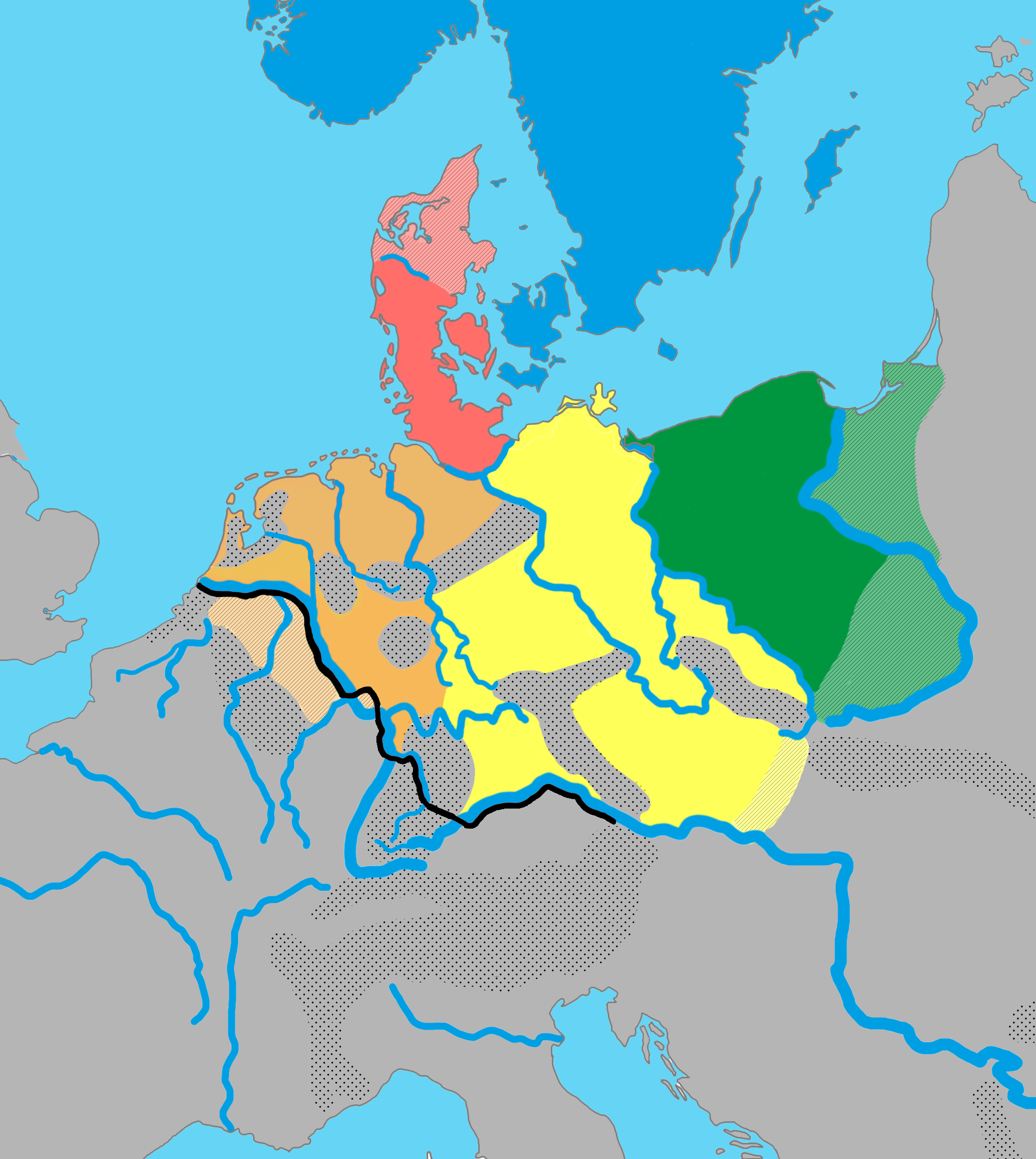
- Friedrich Maurer's proposed division of the Germanic languages in Europe c. AD 1: North Germanic North Sea Germanic, or Ingvaeonic Weser–Rhine Germanic, or Istvaeonic Elbe Germanic, or Irminonic East Germanic †

The East Germanic languages are a group of extinct Germanic languages that were spoken by East Germanic peoples. East Germanic is one of the primary branches of Germanic languages, along with North Germanic and West Germanic.

The only East Germanic language of which texts are known is Gothic, although a word list and some short sentences survive from the debatably-related Crimean Gothic. Other East Germanic languages include Vandalic and Burgundian, though the only remnants of these languages are in the form of isolated words and short phrases. Furthermore, the inclusion of Burgundian has been called into doubt. Crimean Gothic is believed to have survived until the 18th century in isolated areas of Crimea.

== Origin ==
The consensus view is that, of the three main branches of Germanic, East Germanic was the first to branch off, likely originating on the Baltic Sea and moving southward. Earlier scholarship sometimes instead proposed that the North Germanic languages were closely related to the East Germanic languages.

== Classification ==
- East Germanic †
  - Gothic †
  - Vandalic †
  - Burgundian †
  - Crimean Gothic † (disputed, alternatively considered to be West Germanic)

Whereas historians use ethnographic and historical sources to determine whether Germanic groups were "East Germanic peoples," this information is not relevant to linguists. Because only Gothic is well preserved, there are no clear linguistic criteria that characterize all of the languages classified as East Germanic. According to the late-antique historian Procopius of Caesarea, the Ostrogoths, Vandals, Visigoths, and the Gepids all spoke a single Gothic language; this in turn means that linguists often apply the innovations of Gothic to the whole East Germanic group.

Frederik Hartmann argues that East Germanic is not a valid genetic clade, as the three most attested languages conventionally identified as East Germanic (Burgundian, Vandalic, Gothic) do not share any common innovations with each other and all independently split from Proto-Germanic. Hartmann instead prefers the term Eastern Rim languages to refer to these languages.

== See also ==
- Northwest Germanic languages

== Sources ==
- Dabrowski, Jan (1989). "Nordische Kreis und Kulturen Polnischer Gebiete". In Ambrosiani, Björn (ed.). Bronzezeit Im Ostseegebiet (in German). ISBN 978-91-7402-203-2.
- Demougeot, E. La formation de l'Europe et les invasions barbares, Paris: Editions Montaigne, 1969–74.
- Fulk, R. D. (2018-09-15). A Comparative Grammar of the Early Germanic Languages. Studies in Germanic Linguistics. Vol. 3. John Benjamins. doi:10.1075/sigl.3. ISBN 978-90-272-6313-1. S2CID 165765984.
- Hartmann, Frederik; Riegger, Chiara (2022-03-16). "The Burgundian language and its phylogeny: A cladistical investigation". NOWELE. North-Western European Language Evolution. 75 (1): 42–80. doi:10.1075/nowele.00062.har. ISSN 0108-8416.
- Hartmann, Frederik (2023). Germanic phylogeny. Oxford studies in diachronic and historical linguistics. Oxford, United Kingdom; New York, NY: Oxford University Press. ISBN 978-0-19-887273-3. OCLC 1347218384.
- Kaliff, Anders. 2001. Gothic Connections. Contacts between eastern Scandinavia and the southern Baltic coast 1000 BCE – 500 CE.
- Musset, L. Les invasions: les vagues germanique, Paris: Presses universitaires de France, 1965.
- Nordgren, I. 2004. Well Spring of The Goths. About the Gothic Peoples in the Nordic Countries and on the Continent.
- “Gothic Language.” Encyclopædia Britannica, Encyclopædia Britannica, Inc., 20 July 1998, https://www.britannica.com/topic/Gothic-language.
- Stearns, MacDonald (1989). "Das Krimgotische" [Crimean Gothic]. In Beck, Heinrich (ed.). Germanische Rest- und Trümmersprachen (in German). Berlin: W. de Gruyter. pp. 175–194. ISBN 3-11-011948-X.
- Tischler, Johann (2002). "Ostgermanen". In Beck, Heinrich; Geuenich, Dieter; Steuer, Heiko (eds.). Reallexikon der Germanischen Altertumskunde. Vol. 22. Berlin: De Gruyter. pp. 339–344. ISBN 3-11-017163-5.
