= Servaea gens =

Ancient Roman family

The gens Servaea was a minor plebeian family at ancient Rome. Members of this gens are first mentioned during the reign of Tiberius, from which time they presumably rose steadily through the imperial bureaucracy, attaining the consulship under Domitian. A number of inscriptions from the second century or later indicate some of them had settled in Africa, where one family of this gens became particularly illustrious under the Antonine and Severan dynasties.

== Origin ==
The nomen Servaeus belongs to a class of gentilicia formed with the suffix -aeus, which was typical among families of Oscan or Umbrian derivation. The root resembles and may be cognate with the Latin praenomen Servius, meaning one who "keeps safe" or "preserves". In this case, Servaeus is most likely an Oscan or Umbrian cognate of the more common nomen Servilius. A few of the Servaei mentioned in inscriptions lived in central or southern Italy, and one family of this gens bore the surname Sabinus, suggesting that they were of Sabine origin.

== Praenomina ==
The chief praenomen of the Servaei was Quintus, with Lucius and Gaius evidently being used for younger sons. All were among the most common names throughout Roman history. Other praenomina occur infrequently.

== Branches and cognomina ==
The earliest of the Servaei to rise to prominence bore no surname. The first cognomen to appear among the family is Longinus, a diminutive of Longus, a surname originally designating someone who was tall; Servaeus Longinus may have acquired the surname as the son or grandson of a Servaeus Longus, or because he was moderately tall. The name does not seem to have been passed down to subsequent generations. Sabinus, borne by two soldiers, a father and son who served in Galatia during the early second century, probably indicated that the family claimed descent from the Sabines, an ancient people of central Italy, some of whom had migrated to Rome at the time of the city's legendary founding in the eighth century BC.

Innocens, borne by the two Servaei, perhaps father and son, who attained the consulship under Domitian and Trajan, indicated someone of blameless character, and belonged to a large class of surnames derived from a person's habits. The full nomenclature of the first Innocens is uncertain, but the second, who held office in AD 101, bore the polyonymous appellation of Gaius Sertorius Brocchus Quintus Servaeus Innocens, probably indicating that he was descended from the more illustrious house of the Sertorii through a female line. Given the high station that this family reached, it seems possible that the Servaei of Gigthis in Africa Proconsularis was descended from them.

This family seems to have come to prominence with Quintus Servaeus Macer during the reign of Antoninus Pius. His surname, Macer, designated someone who was notably lean, but the chief cognomen of this family seems to have been Fuscus, "dark", which would likely have referred to someone with dark brown hair. This alternated with Firmus, "strong" or "steadfast", and Felix, "happy" or "fortunate". The Servaei Fusci were of equestrian rank, and seem to have formed part of the nobility of Gigthis, where they served in the local senate, and at least one of them, Quintus Servaeus Fuscus Cornelianus, served in the Roman Senate and held a number of important positions throughout the Empire. Another family of colonial Servaei lived at Sufetula in Numidia, but it remains unclear whether or how they might have been related to the Fusci. Some of them bore the surname Potitianus, perhaps commemorating their descent from the ancient Potitia gens.

== Members ==
This list includes abbreviated praenomina. For an explanation of this practice, see filiation.

- Quintus Servaeus, a man of praetorian rank, was appointed governor of Commagene in AD 18. He was among the friends of Germanicus who accused Gnaeus Calpurnius Piso of having poisoned the young general. After the downfall of Sejanus, Servaeus was one of those who were falsely accused of conspiring with the disgraced consul, and condemned; but he avoided execution by giving evidence against Sejanus' accomplices.
- Servaea Ɔ. l. Cleopatra, a freedwoman buried at Brundisium in Calabria, aged sixty-five, along with Gaius Caesius Aesopus, aged eighty, in a tomb dating to the first half of the first century.
- Lucius Servaeus Longinus, named in an inscription from Rome, dating to the first half of the first century.
- Quintus Servaeus, named in an inscription from Rome, dating to the early or middle part of the first century.
- Servaeus Innocens, consul suffectus in AD 82, succeeding the emperor Domitian on the Ides of January, and continuing to the end of February.
- Gaius Sertorius Brocchus Quintus Servaeus Innocens, consul suffectus for the months of April and May in AD 101.
- Titus Servaeus Sabinus, a centurion primus pilus, buried at Savatra in Galatia during the first half of the second century, with a monument from his son, Lucius Servaeus Sabinus, who also became a centurion.
- Lucius Servaeus T. f. Sabinus, son of the primus pilus Titus Servaeus Sabinus, was a centurion in the Legio VIIII Hispana, Legio III Augusta, and Legio VI Victrix. He was honoured with a statue at Savatra, dating to the first half of the second century.
- Marcus Circius Servaeus, built a second-century tomb at Formiae in Latium for his wife, Acilia Primigenia.
- Servaeus Eutychus, buried at Philippi in Macedonia, aged fifty, in a tomb dating between the first and third centuries, dedicated by his wife, Atiaria Acte.
- Quintus Servaeus Victorinus, one of the duumviri quinquennales at Rome, made an offering to Fortuna at Rome, recorded in an inscription from the third century, or the latter part of the second.
- Servaeus Avitus, an eques mentioned in two inscriptions from Lambaesis in Numidia, one of which dates to AD 283 or 284.

=== Servaei Fusci ===
- Quintus Servaeus Q. f. Macer, an eques, and one of the decurions appointed to administer Gigthis in Africa Proconsularis during the reign of Antoninus Pius, dedicated a temple painting and a column at Gigthis, and made offerings to the deified Hadrian, as well as to Romulus and Remus. He was the father of Quintus Servaeus Fuscus and Lucius Servaeus Firmus.
- Quintus Servaeus Q. f. Q. n. Fuscus, together with his brother, Lucius Servaeus Firmus, dedicated a monument at Gigthis to their father, Quintus Servaeus Macer. He may be the same Quintus Servaeus Fuscus named in an inscription from Gigthis, recording his gift of money to another Quintus Servaeus Fuscus, probably his cousin.
- Lucius Servaeus Firmus, together with his brother, Quintus Servaeus Fuscus, dedicated a monument at Gigthis to their father, Quintus Servaeus Macer. He was the husband of Aurelia Antonina, and father of Quintus Servaeus Fuscus and Quintus Servaeus Felix, who dedicated a monument at Gigthis to their mother.
- Quintus Servaeus P. f. Q. n. Fuscus, named in an inscription from Gigthis, recording a gift of money from another Quintus Servaeus Fuscus, probably his cousin, although he describes him as his "faithful brother".
- Quintus Servaeus L. f. Fuscus, the son of Lucius Servaeus Firmus and Aurelia Antonina, was a senator of Gigthis, who was honoured with a monument built at public expense. He and his brother, Quintus Servaeus Felix, dedicated a monument at Gigthis for their mother.
- Quintus Servaeus L. f. Felix, the son of Lucius Servaeus Firmus and Aurelia Antonina, joined his brother, Quintus Servaeus Fuscus, in dedicating a monument at Gigthis to their mother.
- Quintus Servaeus Q. f. Firmus, a member of the senate of Gigthis, who was honoured with a monument built at public expense.
- Quintus Servaeus Fuscus Cornelianus, a native of Gigthis, was a Roman senator, who served as governor of Galatia circa AD 229. He had previously served as Legate of the Legio I Italica and the Legio XIII Gemina, as a judicial official over Calabria, Lucania, Apulia, and Bruttium, tribune of the plebs, and quaestor. He was honoured with a monument at Gigthis.
- Quintus Servaeus Q. f. Honoratus, a flamen honoured by the city of Gigthis with a statue built at public expense.
- Servaeus Insertor, dedicated a monument at Gigthis to his patron.
- Gaius Servaeus C. f. Messius Pacaus, an eques and flamen at Gigthis, dedicated a monument to his wife, Servilia, the daughter of Gaius Servilius Serenus.

=== Servaei Potitiani ===
- Lucius Servaeus Amicus Potitianus, a senator, dedicated a monument at Sufetula in Africa Proconsularis to his grandmother, Flavia Statianilla, whose family had also been of senatorial rank. He may have been the brother of Servaea Flavia Statianilla Valeriana.
- Servaea Novella Rufina Potitiana, named in an inscription from Sufetula, along with the freedmen Servaeus Eugenius and Servaeus Vagulus. She may have been a sister of Servaea Flavia Statianilla Valeriana, or perhaps her mother.
- Servaea Flavia Statianilla Valeriana, a girl named in an inscription from Sufetula, along with the freedmen Eugenius and Vagulus. She may have been a brother of Lucius Servaeus Amicus Potitianus.
- Servaeus Eugenius, a freedman named along with Servaeus Vagulus in inscriptions from Sufetula mentioning Servaea Novella Rufina Potitiana, and Servaea Flavia Statianilla Valeriana.
- Servaeus Vagulus, a freedman named along with Servaeus Eugenius in inscriptions from Sufetula mentioning Servaea Novella Rufina Potitiana, and Servaea Flavia Statianilla Valeriana.

=== Undated Servaei ===
- Quintus Servaeus, named in an inscription from Rome, along with Gaius Popillius.
- Servaea Concessula, the sister of Helpis, and sister-in-law of Hymnus, with whom she was buried in a family sepulchre at Rome.
- Quintus Servaeus Eucarpus, named in an inscription from Corbilo in Gallia Narbonensis.
- Quintus Servaeus Reburrus, made an offering to Mercury at the present site of Sommières, formerly part of Gallia Narbonensis.
- Servaeus Sagaris, buried at Rome, with a monument from his wife, Cingonia Eucarpea.
- Quintus Servaeus Q. l. Seuxus, a freedman at Rome.

== See also ==
- List of Roman gentes

== Bibliography ==
- Publius Cornelius Tacitus, Annales.
- Dictionary of Greek and Roman Biography and Mythology, William Smith, ed., Little, Brown and Company, Boston (1849).
- Theodor Mommsen et alii, Corpus Inscriptionum Latinarum (The Body of Latin Inscriptions, abbreviated CIL), Berlin-Brandenburgische Akademie der Wissenschaften (1853–present).
- Gustav Wilmanns, Inscriptiones Africae Latinae (Latin Inscriptions from Africa), Georg Reimer, Berlin (1881).
- René Cagnat et alii, L'Année épigraphique (The Year in Epigraphy, abbreviated AE), Presses Universitaires de France (1888–present).
- George Davis Chase, "The Origin of Roman Praenomina", in Harvard Studies in Classical Philology, vol. VIII, pp. 103–184 (1897).
- Paul von Rohden, Elimar Klebs, & Hermann Dessau, Prosopographia Imperii Romani (The Prosopography of the Roman Empire, abbreviated PIR), Berlin (1898).
- Benet Salway, "What’s in a Name? A Survey of Roman Onomastic Practice from c. 700 B.C. to A.D. 700", in Journal of Roman Studies, vol. 84, pp. 124–145 (1994).
- John C. Traupman, The New College Latin & English Dictionary, Bantam Books, New York (1995).
