= Germanicus =

Roman general (15 BC–19 AD)

- Bust of Germanicus (Louvre Museum)
- Born: 24 May 15 BC; Rome, Italy
- Died: 10 October AD 19 (aged 33); Antioch, Syria
- Burial: Mausoleum of Augustus
- Spouse: Agrippina the Elder
- Issue among others: Nero Julius Caesar; Drusus Caesar; Gaius Caesar; Julia Agrippina; Julia Drusilla; Julia Livilla
Names
- Germanicus Julius Caesar
- Dynasty: Julio-Claudian
- Father: Nero Claudius Drusus; Tiberius (adoptive)
- Mother: Antonia the Younger
- Office: Quaestor (7 AD); Ornamenta Praetoria (9 AD); Consul (12, 18 AD)
- Military career
- Conflicts: Great Illyrian Revolt; Battle of Idistaviso; Battle of the Angrivarian Wall

Germanicus Julius Caesar (24 May 15 BC – 10 October AD 19) was a Roman general and politician most famously known for his campaigns against Arminius in Germania. The son of Nero Claudius Drusus and Antonia the Younger, Germanicus was born into an influential branch of the patrician gens Claudia. The agnomen Germanicus was added to his full name in 9 BC when it was posthumously awarded to his father in honor of his victories in Germania. In AD 4 he was adopted by his paternal uncle Tiberius, himself the stepson and heir of Germanicus' great-uncle Augustus; ten years later, Tiberius succeeded Augustus as Roman emperor. As a result of his adoption, Germanicus became an official member of the gens Julia, another prominent family, to which he was related on his mother's side. His connection to the Julii Caesares was further consolidated through a marriage between him and Agrippina the Elder, a granddaughter of Augustus. He was also the father of Caligula, the maternal grandfather of Nero, and the older brother of Claudius.

During the reign of Augustus, Germanicus enjoyed an accelerated political career, entering the office of quaestor five years before the legal age in AD 7. He held that office until AD 9 where he was made praetor after the Pannonian war, and was elected consul for the first time in AD 12. The year after, he was made proconsul of Germania Inferior, Germania Superior, and all of Gaul. From there he commanded eight legions, about one-third of the entire Roman army at the time, which he led against the Germanic tribes in his campaigns from AD 14 to 16. He avenged the Roman Empire's defeat in the Teutoburg Forest and retrieved two of the three legionary eagles that had been lost during the battle. In AD 17, he returned to Rome, where he received a triumph before leaving to reorganize the provinces of Asia Minor, whereby he incorporated the provinces of Cappadocia and Commagene in AD 18.

While in the eastern provinces, Germanicus came into conflict with the governor of Syria, Gnaeus Calpurnius Piso. During their feud, Germanicus became ill in Antioch and died on 10 October AD 19. His death has been attributed to poison by ancient sources, but that was never proven. As a famous general, he was widely popular and regarded as the ideal Roman long after his death. According to Roman historian Tacitus, some of the populace saw Germanicus as the Roman equivalent of Alexander the Great.

== Name ==
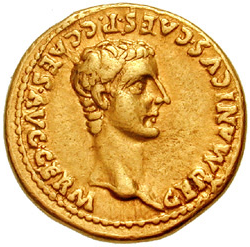
Aureus with the portrait of Germanicus

Germanicus's praenomen (personal name) at birth is unknown, but he was probably named Nero Claudius Drusus after his father (conventionally called "Drusus"), or possibly Tiberius Claudius Nero after his paternal uncle. He took the agnomen (nickname) "Germanicus", awarded posthumously to his father in honor of his victories in Germania, at which point he nominally became head of the family in 9 BC. By AD 4 his uncle Tiberius adopted Germanicus as his son and heir. As a result, Germanicus was adopted out of the gens Claudia and into that of the gens Julia. In accordance with Roman naming conventions, he adopted the name "Julius Caesar" while retaining his agnomen, becoming Germanicus Julius Caesar. (Note: His agnomen, "Germanicus", was a cognomen ex virtute, and would at first be a suffix at the end of his full name, and became the first part of his full name following his adoption into the Julii, as his original praenomen and nomen were removed, "Germanicus" was retained, and thus attained usage as his praenomen preceding the new additions (the nomen "Julius", and cognomen "Caesar", respectively) (Possanza 2004, p. 225).) Upon Germanicus' adoption into the Julii, his brother Claudius became the sole legal representative of his father, inheriting the agnomen "Germanicus" as the new head of the family.

== House and early life ==
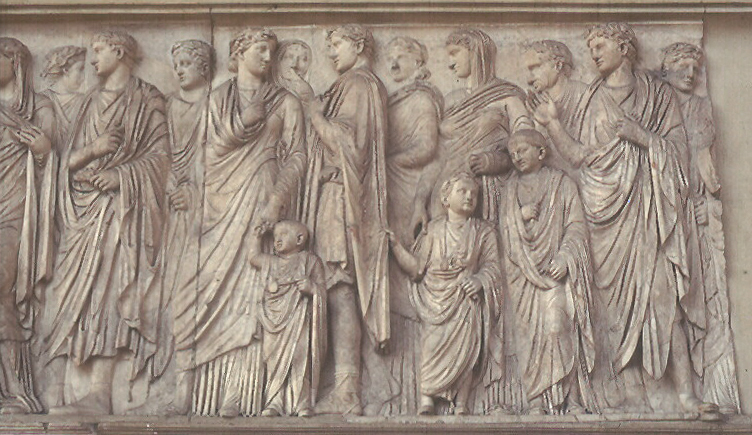
Ara Pacis: processional frieze showing members of the Imperial household (south face). Germanicus is the toddler holding Antonia Minor's hand.

Germanicus was born in Rome on 24 May 15 BC to Nero Claudius Drusus and Antonia Minor and had two younger siblings: a sister, Livilla, and a brother, Claudius. His paternal grandmother was Livia, who had divorced his grandfather Tiberius Claudius Nero around 24 years before Germanicus' birth. Livia's second marriage was to the Roman emperor Augustus. His maternal grandparents were the triumvir Mark Antony and Augustus' sister Octavia Minor. Germanicus was a key figure in the Julio-Claudian dynasty of the early Roman Empire. Tiberius, Germanicus' uncle, became the second Roman emperor and would be succeeded by Germanicus' son Gaius. Germanicus was also the brother of the fourth emperor, Claudius, and the grandfather of the fifth emperor, Nero.

When Augustus' chosen successor, Gaius Caesar, died in AD 4, he briefly considered Germanicus as his heir. His wife Livia persuaded him to choose his stepson Tiberius instead. As part of the succession arrangements, Augustus adopted Tiberius on 26 June AD 4, but first required him to adopt Germanicus, thus placing him next in the line of succession after Tiberius. (Note: Tiberius had to adopt Germanicus first because his own adoption by Augustus resulted in the loss of sui iuris, which included the legal right to adopt (Swan 2004, p. 142).) Germanicus married Augustus' granddaughter, Agrippina the Elder, probably the next year, to further strengthen his ties to the imperial family. The couple had nine children: Nero Julius Caesar; Drusus Caesar; Tiberius Julius Caesar (not to be confused with emperor Tiberius); a child of unknown name (normally referred to as Ignotus); Gaius the Elder; Gaius the Younger (the future emperor "Caligula"); Agrippina the Younger (the future empress); Julia Drusilla; and Julia Livilla. Only six of his children came of age; Tiberius and the Ignotus died as infants, and Gaius the Elder in his early childhood.

== Career ==
Bust of young Germanicus at the time of his adoption by Tiberius in AD 4

=== Batonian War ===
Map of the uprising

Germanicus became a quaestor in AD 7, four years before the legal age of 25. He was sent to Illyricum the same year to help Tiberius suppress a rebellion by the Pannonians and Dalmatians. (Note: According to Cassius Dio, Augustus sent Germanicus to Illyricum because Tiberius' lack of activity led to suspicions that he was deliberately dragging his feet, using the pretense of war to remain under arms as long as possible.Pettinger 2012, p. 97.) He brought with him an army of levied citizens and former slaves to reinforce Tiberius at Siscia, his base of operations in Illyricum. Towards the end of the year, additional reinforcements arrived; three legions from Moesia commanded by Aulus Caecina Severus, and two legions with Thracian cavalry and auxiliary troops from Anatolia commanded by Silvanus.

By the time Germanicus had arrived in Pannonia, the rebels had resorted to raiding from the mountain fortresses to which they had withdrawn. Because the Roman legions were not so effective at countering this tactic, Tiberius deployed his auxiliary forces and divided his army into small detachments, allowing them to cover more ground and conduct a war of attrition against the rebels in their strong defensive positions. The Romans also began to drive the rebels out of the countryside, offering amnesty to those tribes that would lay down their arms, and implemented a scorched earth policy in an effort to starve the enemy out. During this period, Germanicus' detachments were in action against the Mazaei, whom he defeated.

The rebel position in Pannonia collapsed in AD 8 when one of their commanders, Bato the Breucian, surrendered their leader Pinnes to the Romans and laid down his arms in return for amnesty. This was nullified when Bato the Breucian was defeated in battle and subsequently executed by his former ally Bato the Daesitiate, but this left the Pannonians divided against each other, and the Romans were able to subdue the Breuci without battle. The pacification of the Breuci, with their large population and resources, was a significant victory for the Romans, who would be reinforced by eight cohorts of Breuci auxiliaries towards the end of the war. Bato the Daesitiate withdrew from Pannonia to Dalmatia, where he occupied the mountains of Bosnia and began conducting counter-attacks, most likely against the indigenous people who sided with the Romans. Later in the year, Tiberius left Lepidus in command of Siscia and Silvanus at Sirmium.

Roman forces took the initiative in AD 9, and pushed into Dalmatia. Tiberius divided his forces into three divisions: one under Silvanus, which advanced south-east from Sirmium; another commanded by Lepidus, which advanced north-west along the Una Valley from Siscia toward Burnum; and the third led by Tiberius and Germanicus in the Dalmatian hinterland. The divisions under Lepidus and Silvanus practically exterminated the Perustae and Daesitiate in their mountain strongholds. Roman forces captured many cities, and those commanded by Germanicus took Raetinum, near Seretium (although it was destroyed in a fire set by the rebels during the siege), Splonum (in modern-day northern Montenegro) and Seretium itself (in modern-day western Bosnia). The Roman forces under Tiberius and Germanicus pursued Bato to the fortress of Andretium near Salona, to which they laid siege. When it became clear Bato would not surrender, Tiberius assaulted the fortress and captured him. While Tiberius negotiated the terms of surrender, Germanicus was sent on a punitive expedition across the surrounding territory, during which he forced the surrender of the fortified town of Arduba and surrounding towns. He then sent a deputy to subdue the remaining districts and returned to Tiberius.

=== Interim ===
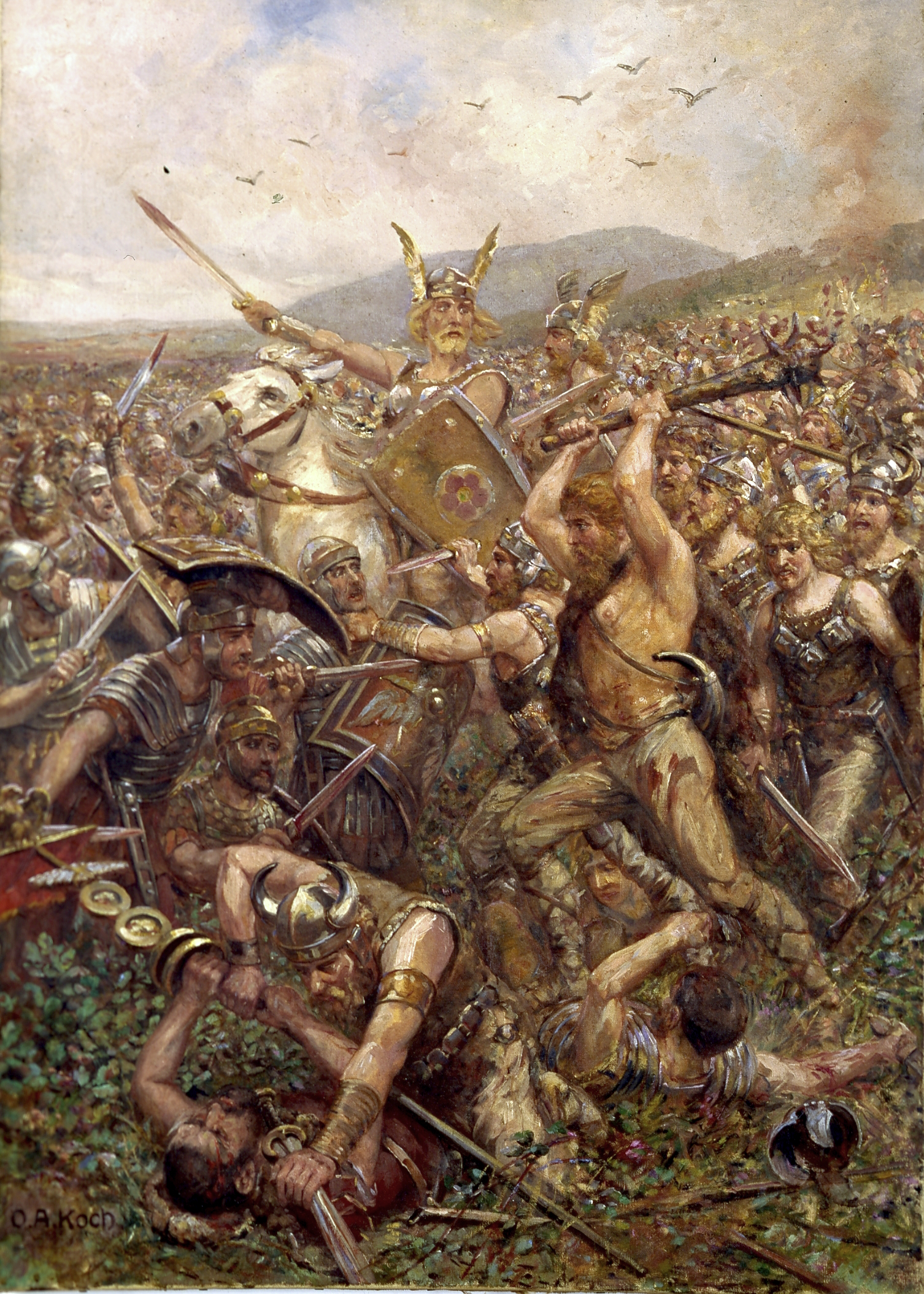
Battle of Teutoburg Forest, by Otto Albert Koch (1909)

After a distinguished start to his military career, Germanicus returned to Rome in late AD 9 to personally announce his victory. He was honored with a triumphal insignia (without an actual triumph) and the rank (not the actual title) of praetor. He was also given permission to be a candidate for consul before the regular time and the right to speak first in the Senate after the consuls. According to Cassius Dio, Germanicus was a popular quaestor because he acted as an advocate as much in capital jurisdiction cases before Augustus as he did before lesser judges in standard quaestiones (trials). He successfully defended, for example, a quaestor accused of murder in AD 10 in which the prosecutor, fearing the jurors would find in favor of the defense out of deference for Germanicus, demanded a trial before Augustus.

In AD 9, three Roman legions commanded by Varus were destroyed by a coalition of German tribes led by Arminius in the Battle of the Teutoburg Forest. As proconsul, Germanicus was dispatched with Tiberius to defend the empire against the Germans in AD 11. The two generals crossed the Rhine, made various excursions into enemy territory and, in the beginning of autumn, recrossed the river. The campaigns of Tiberius and Germanicus in Germania in the years AD 11–12, combined with an alliance with the Marcomannic federation of Marbod, prevented the German coalition from crossing the Rhine and invading Gaul and Italy. In winter, Germanicus returned to Rome, where he was, after five mandates as quaestor and despite never having been aedile or praetor, appointed consul for the year AD 12. He shared the consulship with Gaius Fonteius Capito. He continued to advocate for defendants in court during his consulship, a popular move reminiscent of his previous work defending the accused in front of Augustus. He also courted popularity by ministering the Ludi Martiales (games of Mars), as mentioned by Pliny the Elder in his Historia Naturalis, in which he released two hundred lions in the Circus Maximus.

On 23 October AD 12, Tiberius held a triumph for his victory over the Pannonians and Dalmatians, which he had postponed on account of the defeat of Varus at Teutoburg Forest. He was accompanied, among his other generals, by Germanicus, for whom he had obtained the triumphal regalia. Unlike his adoptive brother Drusus, who received no recognition beyond being the son of a triumphator, Germanicus played a distinguished part in the celebration and was given the opportunity to display his consular insignia and triumphal ornaments.

=== Commander of Roman campaigns in Germania ===
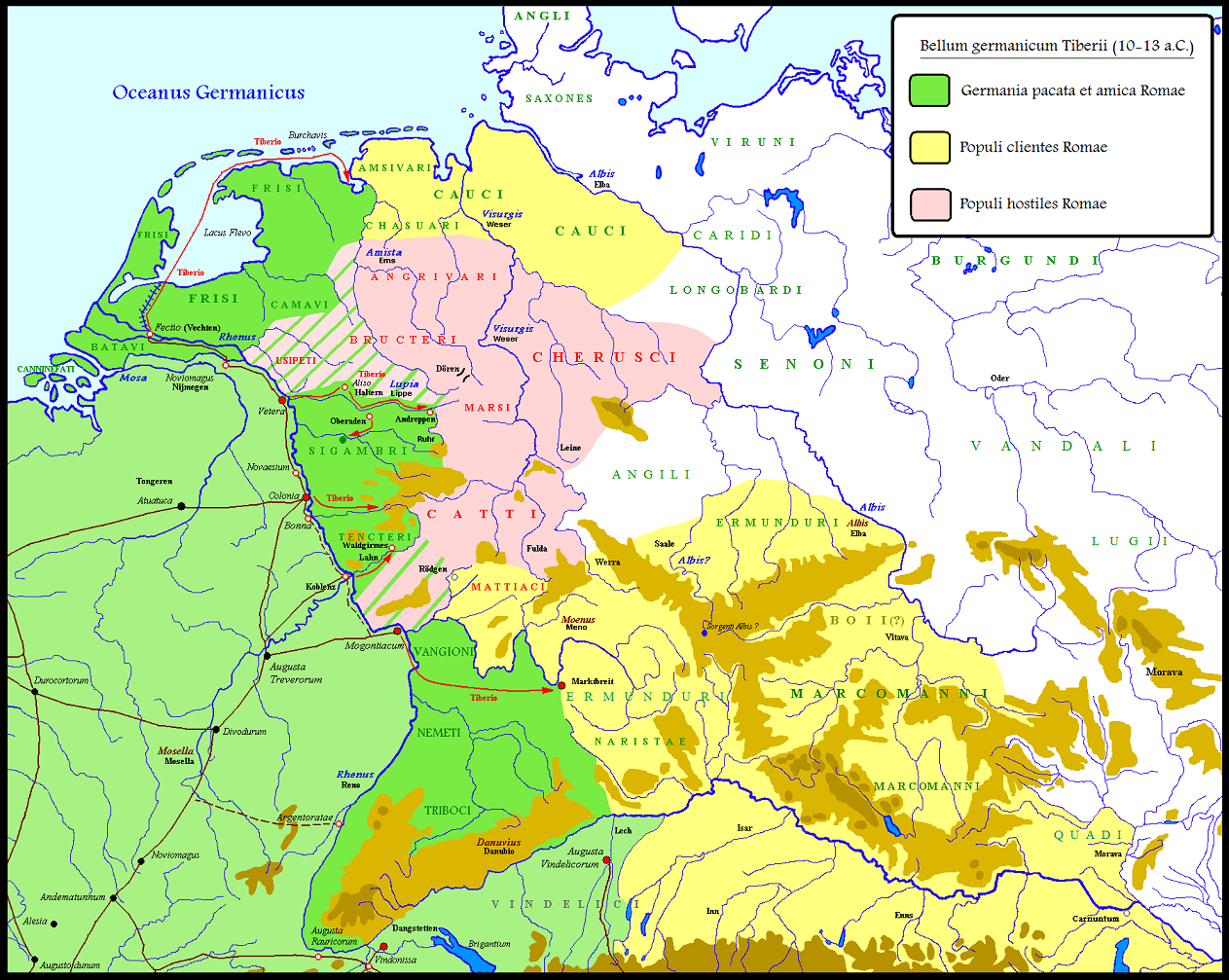
Campaigns of Tiberius and Germanicus in the years AD 10/11-13. In pink the anti-Roman Germanic coalition led by Arminius. In dark green, territories still directly held by the Romans, in yellow the Roman client states

In AD 13, Augustus appointed him commander of the forces at the Rhine, which totaled eight legions and was about one-third of Rome's total military force. The next year in August, Augustus died and on 17 September the Senate met to confirm Tiberius as princeps. That day the Senate also dispatched a delegation to Germanicus' camp to send its condolences for the death of his grandfather and to grant him proconsular imperium. The delegation would not arrive until October.

In Germany and Illyricum, the legions were in mutiny. In Germany, the legions in mutiny were those of the Lower Rhine under Aulus Caecina (the V Alaudae, XXI Rapax, I Germanica, and XX Valeria Victrix). The army of the Lower Rhine was stationed in summer quarters on the border of the Ubii. They had not been paid the bonuses promised them by Augustus and, when it became clear a response from Tiberius was not forthcoming, they revolted. Germanicus dealt with the troops in Germania, and Tiberius' son Drusus dealt with Illyricum.

The army of the Lower Rhine sought an increase in pay, the reduction of their service to 16 years (down from 20) to mitigate the hardship of their military tasks, and vengeance against the centurions for their cruelty. After Germanicus arrived, the soldiers listed their complaints to him and attempted to proclaim him emperor. His open and affable manners made him popular with the soldiers, but he remained loyal to the emperor. When news of the mutiny reached the army of the Upper Rhine under Gaius Silius (the Legions II Augusta, XIII Gemina, XVI Gallica, and XIV Gemina) a meeting was held to meet their demands. Germanicus negotiated a settlement:

- After 20 years of service, a full discharge was given, but after 16 years an immunity from military tasks, except to take part in actions (missio sub vexillo).
- The donative left by Augustus to the troops was to be doubled and discharged.

==== First campaign against the Germanic tribes ====
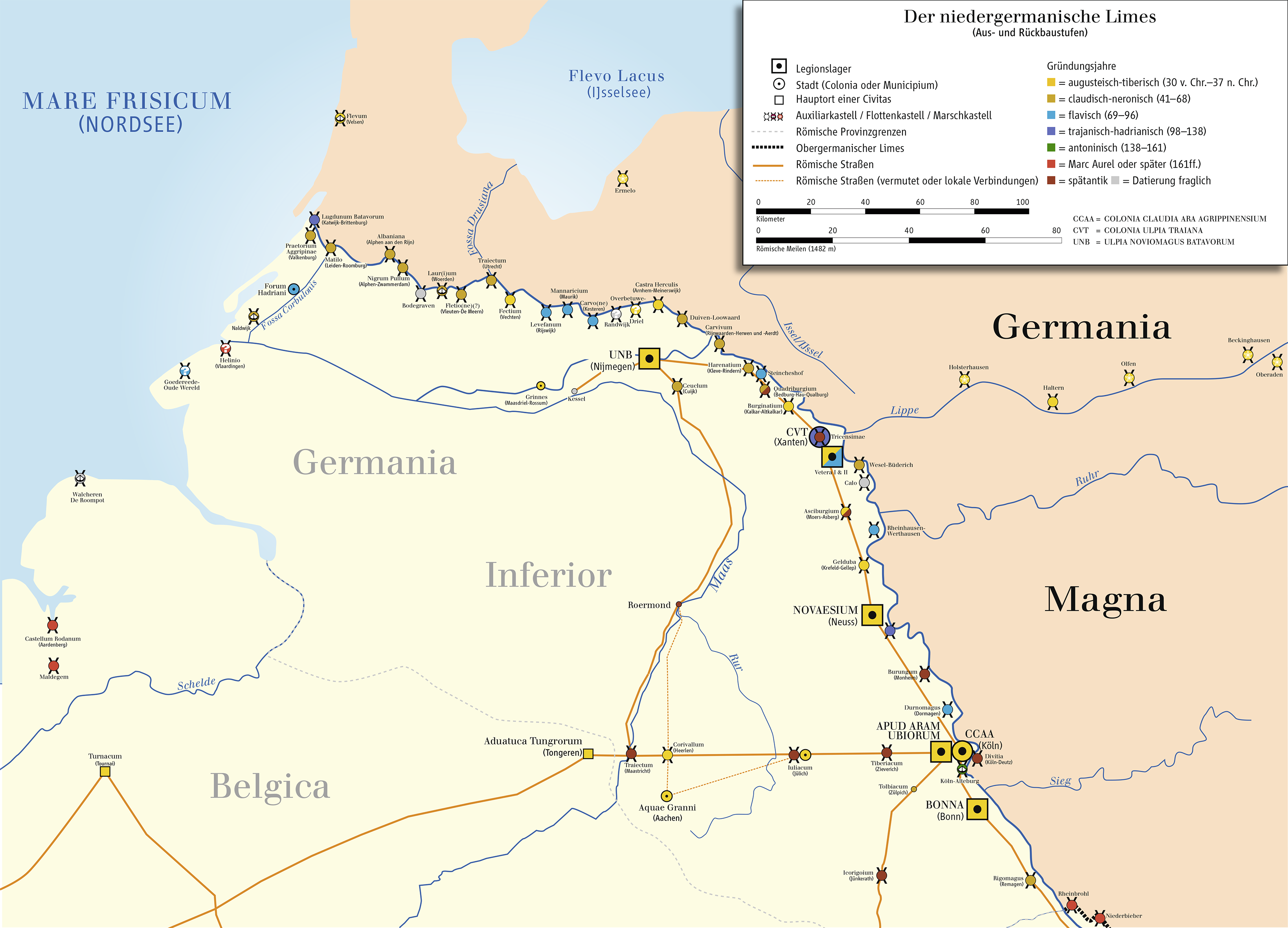
Map of the Lower (Northern) Germanic limes. Shows the legion camps and forts in Germania Inferior.

To satisfy the requisition promised to the legions, Germanicus paid them out of his own pocket. All eight legions were given money, even if they did not demand it. Both the armies of the Lower and Upper Rhine had returned to order. It seemed prudent to satisfy the armies, but Germanicus took it a step further. In a bid to secure the loyalty of his troops, he led them on a raid against the Marsi, a Germanic people on the upper Ruhr river. Germanicus massacred the villages of the Marsi he encountered and pillaged the surrounding territory. On the way back to their winter quarters at Castra Vetera, they pushed successfully through the opposing tribes (Bructeri, Tubantes, and Usipetes) between the Marsi and the Rhine.

Back at Rome, Tiberius instituted the Sodales Augustales, a priesthood of the cult of Augustus, of which Germanicus became a member. When news arrived of his raid, Tiberius commemorated his services in the Senate. The Senate, in absence of Germanicus, voted that he should be given a triumph. Ovid's Fasti dates the Senate vote of Germanicus' triumph to 1 January AD 15.

==== Second campaign against the Germanic tribes ====
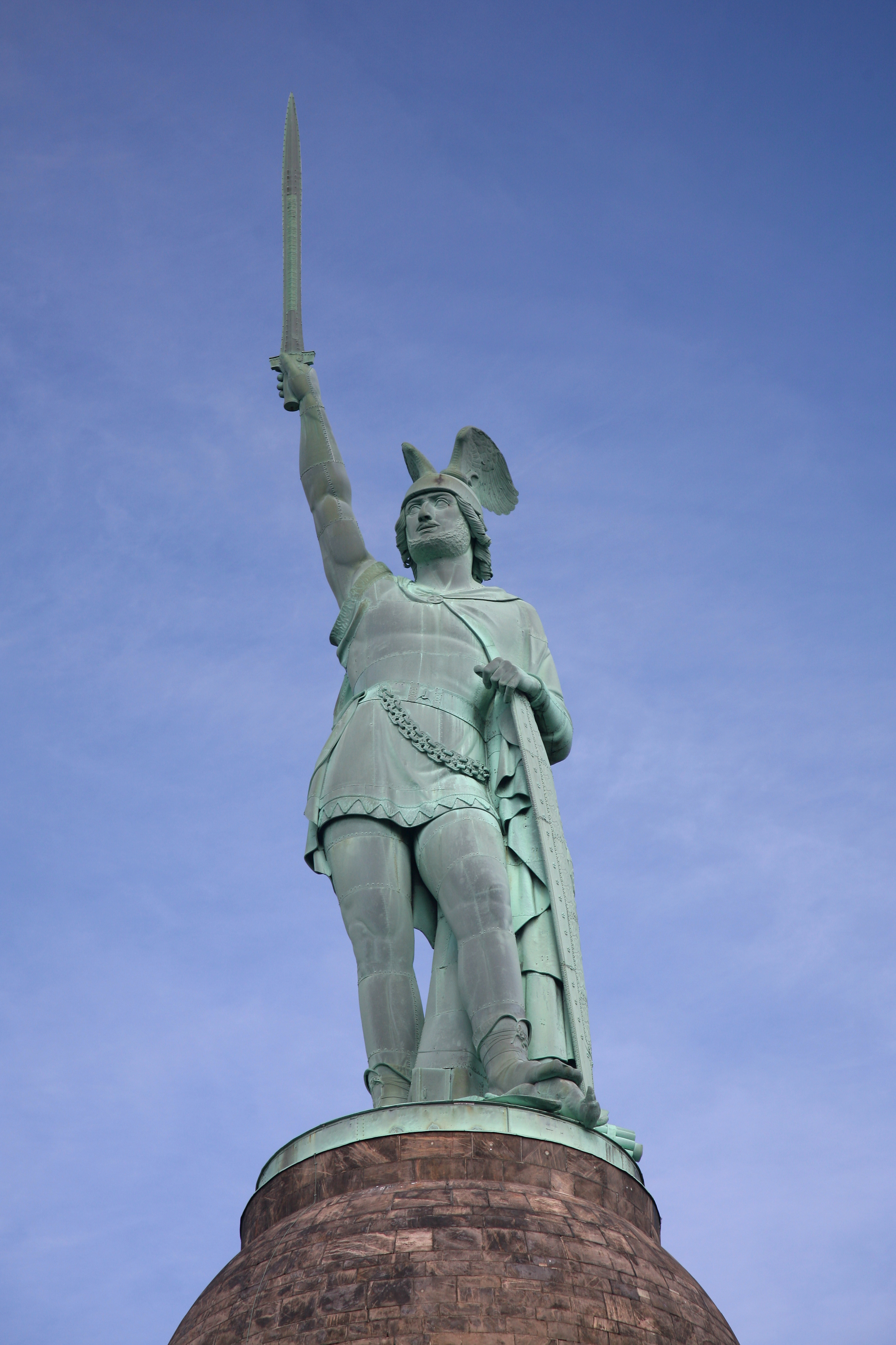
Hermannsdenkmal Memorial to Arminius near Detmold, Germany

For the next two years, he led his legions across the Rhine against the Germans, where they would confront the forces of Arminius and his allies. Tacitus says the purpose of those campaigns was to avenge the defeat of Varus at the Battle of Teutoburg Forest, and not to expand Roman territory.

In early spring AD 15, Germanicus crossed the Rhine and struck the Chatti. He sacked their capital Mattium (modern Maden near Gudensberg), pillaged their countryside, then returned to the Rhine. Sometime this year, he received word from Segestes, who was held prisoner by Arminius's forces and needed help. Germanicus's troops rescued Segestes and took his pregnant daughter, Arminius's wife Thusnelda, into captivity. Again he marched back victorious and at the direction of Tiberius, accepted the title of Imperator.

Arminius called his tribe, the Cherusci, and the surrounding tribes to arms. Germanicus coordinated a land and riverine offensive, with troops marching eastward across the Rhine, and sailing from the North Sea up the Ems River in order to attack the Bructeri and Cherusci. Germanicus' forces went through Bructeri territory, where a general, Lucius Stertinius, recovered the lost eagle of the XIX Legion from among the equipment of the Bructeri after routing them in battle.

Germanicus's legions met up to the north, and ravaged the countryside between the Ems and the Lippe, and penetrated to the Teutoburg Forest, a mountain forest in western Germany situated between these two rivers. There, Germanicus and some of his men visited the site of the disastrous Battle of the Teutoburg Forest, and began burying the remains of the Roman soldiers that had been left in the open. After half a day of the work, he called off the burial of bones so that they could continue their war against the Germans. He made his way into the heartland of the Cherusci. At a location Tacitus calls the pontes longi ("long causeways"), in boggy lowlands somewhere near the Ems, Arminius's troops attacked the Romans. Arminius initially caught Germanicus's cavalry in a trap, inflicting minor casualties, but the Roman infantry reinforced the rout and checked them. The fighting lasted for two days, with neither side achieving a decisive victory. Germanicus's forces withdrew and returned to the Rhine. (Note: Tacitus claims that the Romans won the battle at pontes longi (Tacitus & Barrett 2008, p. 39); however, Wells says the battle was inconclusive (Wells 2003, p. 206).)

==== Third campaign against the Germanic tribes ====
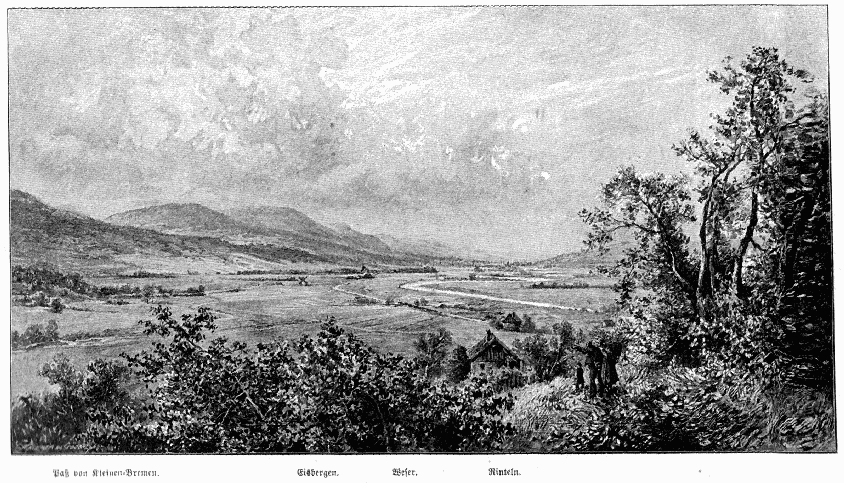
Photograph of the field of Idistaviso by Dr. Paul Knötel (c. 1895)

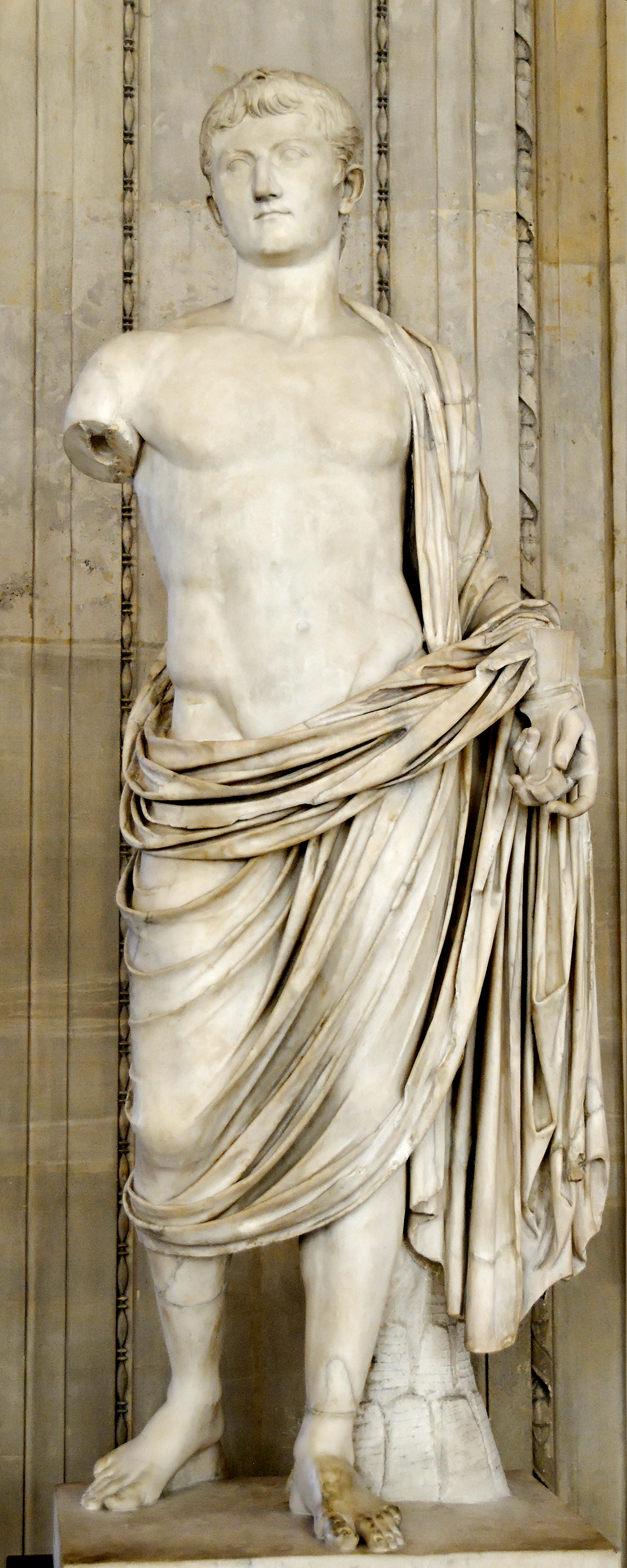
Statue of Germanicus (Louvre Museum)

In preparations for his next campaign, Germanicus sent Publius Vitellius and Gaius Antius to collect taxes in Gaul, and instructed Silius, Anteius, and Caecina to build a fleet. A fort on the Lippe called Castra Aliso was besieged, but the attackers dispersed on sight of Roman reinforcements. The Germans destroyed the nearby mound and altar dedicated to his father Drusus, but he had them both restored and celebrated funerary games with his legions in honor of his father. New barriers and earthworks were put in place, securing the area between Fort Aliso and the Rhine.

Germanicus commanded eight legions with Gallic and Germanic auxiliary units overland across the Rhine, up the Ems and Weser rivers as part of his last major campaign against Arminius in AD 16. His forces met those of Arminius on the plains of Idistaviso, by the Weser River near modern Rinteln, in an engagement called the Battle of the Weser River. Tacitus says that the battle was a Roman victory:

the enemy were slaughtered from the fifth hour of daylight to nightfall, and for ten miles the ground was littered with corpses and weapons.

Arminius and his uncle Inguiomer were both wounded in the battle but evaded capture. The Roman soldiers involved on the battlefield honored Tiberius as Imperator, and raised a pile of arms as a trophy with the names of the defeated tribes inscribed beneath them.

The sight of the Roman trophy constructed on the battlefield enraged the Germans who were preparing to retreat beyond the Elbe, and they launched an attack on the Roman positions at the Angrivarian Wall, thus beginning a second battle. The Romans had anticipated the attack and again routed the Germans. Germanicus stated that he did not want any prisoners, as the extermination of the Germanic tribes was the only conclusion he saw for the war. The victorious Romans then raised a mound with the inscription: "The army of Tiberius Caesar, after thoroughly conquering the tribes between the Rhine and the Elbe, has dedicated this monument to Mars, Jupiter, and Augustus."

Germanicus sent some troops back to the Rhine, with some of them taking the land route, but most of them took the fast route and traveled by boat. They went down the Ems toward the North Sea, but as they reached the sea, a storm struck, sinking many of the boats and killing many men and horses.

Then Germanicus ordered Gaius Silius to march against the Chatti with a mixed force of 3,000 cavalry and 33,000 infantry and lay waste to their territory, while he himself, with a larger army, invaded the Marsi for the third time and devastated their land. He forced Mallovendus, the defeated leader of the Marsi, to reveal the location of another of the three legion's eagles lost in AD 9. Immediately Germanicus despatched troops to recover it. The Romans advanced into the country, defeating any foe they encountered.

Germanicus's successes in Germany had made him popular with the soldiers. He had dealt a significant blow to Rome's enemies, quelled an uprising of troops, and returned lost standards to Rome. His actions had increased his fame, and he had become very popular with the Roman people. Tiberius took notice, and had Germanicus recalled to Rome and informed him that he would be given a triumph and reassigned to a different command.

==== Result ====
The effort it would have taken to conquer Germania Magna was deemed too great when compared with the low potential for profit from acquiring the new territory. Rome regarded Germany as a wild territory of forests and swamps, with little wealth compared to territories Rome already had. However, the campaign significantly healed the Roman psychological trauma from the Varus disaster, and greatly recovered Roman prestige. In addition to the recovery of two of the three lost eagles, Germanicus had fought Arminius, the leader who destroyed the three Roman legions in AD 9. In leading his troops across the Rhine without recourse to Tiberius, he contradicted the advice of Augustus to keep that river as the boundary of the empire, and opened himself to potential doubts from Tiberius about his motives in taking such independent action. This error in political judgment gave Tiberius reason to controversially recall his nephew. Tacitus attributed the recall to Tiberius' jealousy of the glory Germanicus had acquired, and, with some bitterness, claims that Germanicus could have completed the conquest of Germania had he been given full operational independence.

=== Recall ===
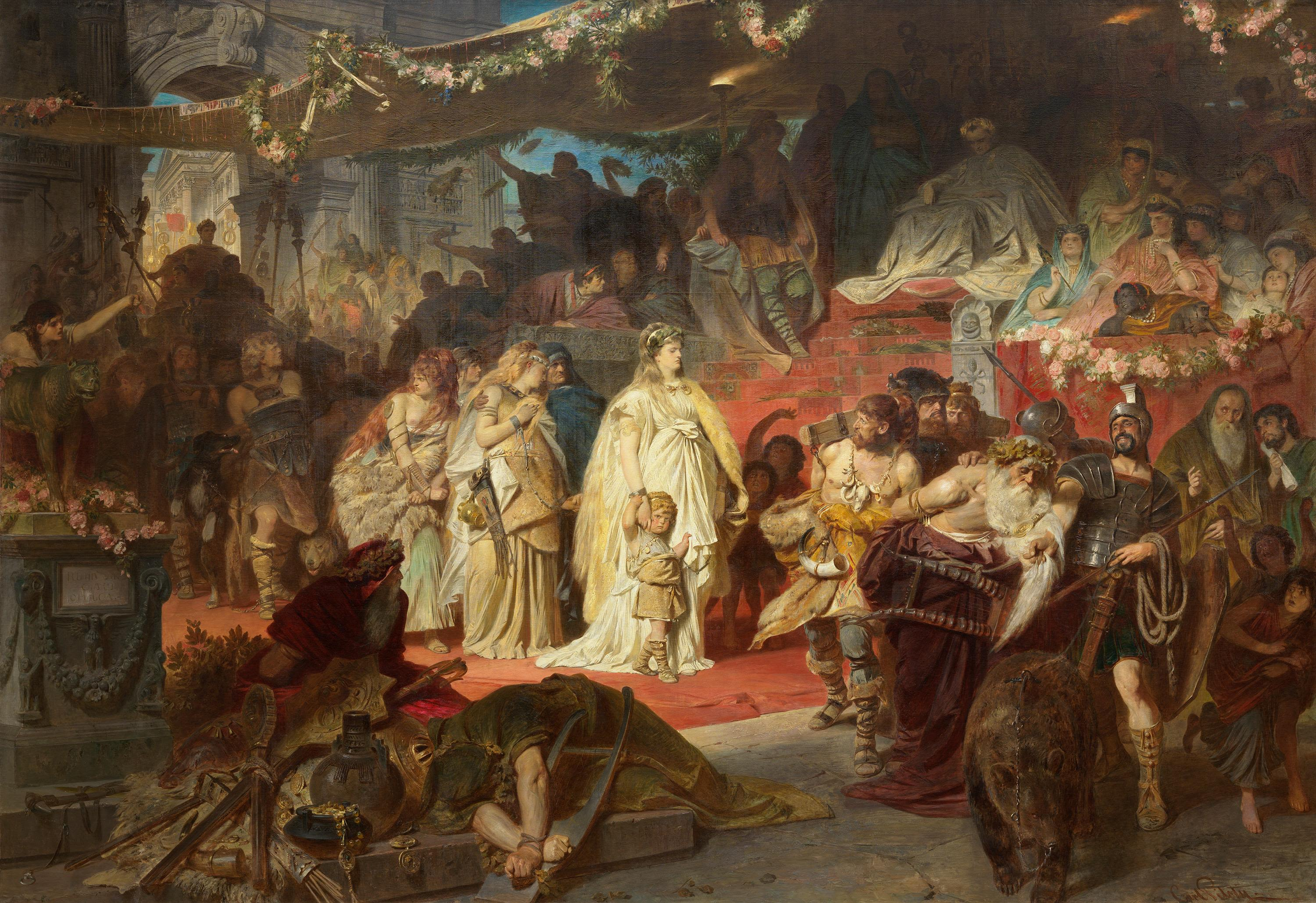
Thusnelda at the Triumph of Germanicus, by Karl von Piloty, 1873

At the beginning of AD 17, Germanicus returned to the capital and on 26 May he celebrated a triumph. He had captured a few important prisoners, but Arminius was still at large. And yet, Strabo, who may have been in Rome at the time, in mentioning the name of Thusnelda, the captured pregnant wife of Arminius, draws attention to the fact that her husband, the victor at Teutoburg Forest, had not been captured and the war itself had not been won. Nonetheless, this did not take away from the spectacle of his triumph: a near contemporary calendar marks 26 May as the day in "which Germanicus Caesar was borne into the city in triumph", while coins issued under his son Gaius (Caligula) depicted him on a triumphal chariot, with the reverse reading "Standards Recovered. Germans Defeated."

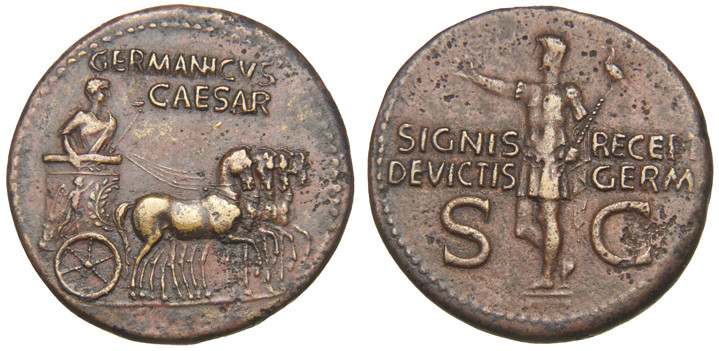
A dupondius from 37 to 41 CE, showing the Triumph of Germanicus on the obverse, and Germanicus holding an aquila on the reverse

His triumph included a long procession of captives including the wife of Arminius, Thusnelda, and her three-year-old son, among others of the defeated German tribes. (Note: Captives featured in the triumph include: "Segimuntus, the son of Segestes, the chief of the Cherusci, and his sister, named Thusnelda, the wife of Armenius, who led on the Cherusci when they treacherously attacked Quintilius Varus, and even to this day continues the war; likewise his son Thumelicus, a boy three years old, as also Sesithacus, the son of Segimerus, chief of the Cherusci, and his wife Rhamis, the daughter of Ucromirus, chief of the Chatti, and Deudorix, the son of Bætorix, the brother of Melon, of the nation of the Sicambri; but Segestes, the father-in-law of Armenius, from the commencement opposed the designs of his son-in-law, and taking advantage of a favorable opportunity, went over to the Roman camp and witnessed the triumphal procession over those who were dearest to him, he being held in honor by the Romans. There was also led in triumph Libes the priest of the Chatti, and many other prisoners of the various vanquished nations, the Cathylci and the Ampsani, the Bructeri, the Usipi, the Cherusci, the Chatti, the Chattuarii, the Landi, the Tubattii." (Strabo, Geography, VII.4.33–38).) The procession displayed replicas of mountains, rivers, and battles; and the war was considered closed.

Tiberius gave money out to the people of Rome in Germanicus' name, and Germanicus was scheduled to hold the consulship next year with the emperor. As a result, in AD 18, Germanicus was granted the eastern part of the empire, just as Agrippa and Tiberius had received before, when they were successors to the emperor.

=== Command in Asia ===
Map of Armenia and the Roman client states in eastern Asia Minor

Following his triumph, Germanicus was sent to Asia to reorganize the provinces and kingdoms there, which were in such disarray that the attention of a domus Augusta was deemed necessary to settle matters. (Note: Domus Augusta (lit. "House of Augustus") was the family of Tiberius including cognate relations (Cascio 2005, p. 140).) Germanicus was given imperium maius (extraordinary command) over the other governors and commanders of the area he was to operate; however, Tiberius had replaced the governor of Syria with Gnaeus Calpurnius Piso, who was meant to be his helper (adiutor), but turned out to be hostile. According to Tacitus, this was an attempt to separate Germanicus from his familiar troops and weaken his influence, but the historian Richard Alston says Tiberius had little reason to undermine his heir.

Germanicus had a busy year in AD 17. He restored a temple of Spes, and allegedly won a chariot race in the name of Tiberius at the Olympic Games that year. However, Eusebius, our main reference for this, does not name Germanicus, and Tacitus makes no reference to this occasion either, which would have required Germanicus to make two trips to Greece within a year. Also, not waiting to take up his consulship in Rome, he left after his triumph but before the end of AD 17. He sailed down the Illyrian coast of the Adriatic Sea to Greece. He arrived at Nicopolis near the site of the Battle of Actium, where he took up his second consulship on 18 January AD 18. He visited the sites associated with his adoptive grandfather Augustus and his natural grandfather Mark Antony, before crossing the sea to Lesbos and then to Asia Minor. There he visited the site of Troy and the oracle of Apollo Claros near Colophon. Piso left at the same time as Germanicus, but traveled directly to Athens and then to Rhodes where he and Germanicus met for the first time. From there Piso left for Syria where he immediately began replacing the officers with men loyal to himself in a bid to win the loyalty of his soldiers.

Next Germanicus traveled through Syria to Armenia where he installed king Artaxias as a replacement for Vonones, whom Augustus had deposed and placed under house arrest at the request of the king of Parthia, Artabanus. The king of Cappadocia died too, whereupon Germanicus sent Quintus Veranius to organize Cappadocia as a province – a profitable endeavor as Tiberius was able to halve the sales tax from 1% to 0.5%. The revenue from the new province was enough to make up the difference lost from lowering the sales tax. The kingdom of Commagene was split on whether or not to remain free or to become a province with both sides sending deputations, so Germanicus sent Quintus Servaeus to organize the province.

Having settled these matters he traveled to Cyrrhus, a city in Syria between Antioch and the Euphrates, where he spent the rest of AD 18 in the winter quarters of the Legion X Fretensis. Evidently here Piso attended Germanicus, and quarreled because he failed to send troops to Armenia when ordered. Artabanus sent an envoy to Germanicus requesting that Vonones be moved further from Armenia as to not incite trouble there. Germanicus complied, moving Vonones to Cilicia, both to please Artabanus and to insult Piso, with whom Vonones was friendly.

==== Egypt ====
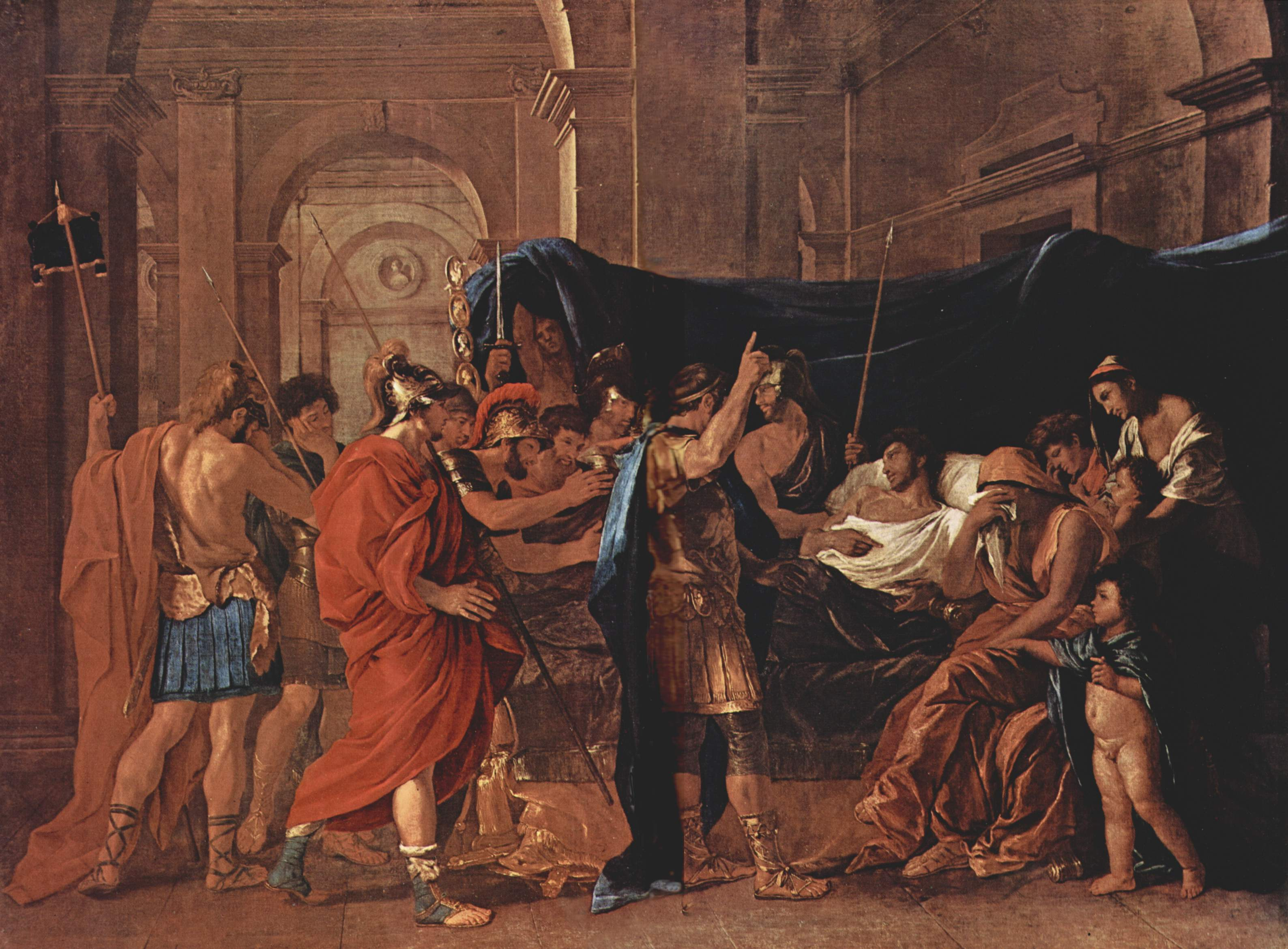
Nicolas Poussin, The Death of Germanicus (1627), oil painting. Collection Minneapolis Institute of Arts.

He then made his way to Egypt, arriving to a tumultuous reception in January AD 19. He had gone there to relieve a famine in the country vital to Rome's food supply. The move upset Tiberius, because it had violated an order by Augustus that no senator shall enter the province without consulting the emperor and the Senate (Egypt was an imperial province, and belonged to the emperor). (Note: That he violated this order is possibly confirmed by the fact that the trip is omitted in Germanicus' res gestae in the Senatus Consultum de memoria honoranda Germanini Caesaris, a commemorative decree issued by the Senate and approved by Tiberius following his death (Lott 2012, p. 343).) Germanicus entered the province in his capacity as proconsul without first seeking permission to do so. He returned to Syria by summer, where he found that Piso had either ignored or revoked his orders to the cities and legions. Germanicus in turn ordered Piso's recall to Rome, although this action was probably beyond his authority.

=== Illness and death ===
In the midst of this feud, Germanicus became ill and despite the fact Piso had removed himself to the port of Seleucia, he was convinced that Piso was somehow poisoning him. Tacitus reports that there were signs of black magic in Piso's house with hidden body-parts and Germanicus's name inscribed on lead tablets. Germanicus sent Piso a letter formally renouncing their friendship (amicitia). Germanicus died soon after on 10 October of that year. His death aroused much speculation, with several sources blaming Piso, acting under orders from Emperor Tiberius. This was never proven, and Piso killed himself while facing trial.

The death of Germanicus in dubious circumstances greatly affected Tiberius's popularity in Rome, leading to the creation of a climate of fear in Rome itself. Also suspected of connivance in his death was Tiberius's chief advisor, Sejanus, who would, in the AD 20s, create an atmosphere of fear in Roman noble and administrative circles by the use of treason trials and the role of delatores, or informers.

== Post-mortem ==
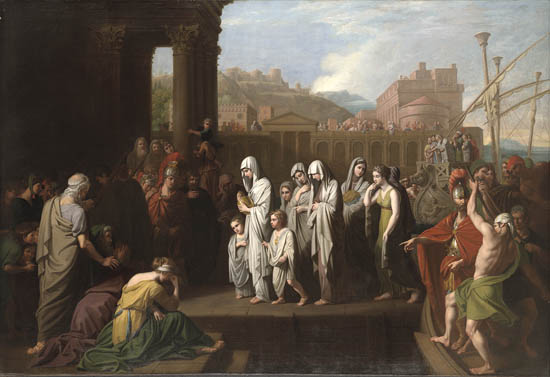
Benjamin West, Agrippina Landing at Brundisium with the Ashes of Germanicus (1768), oil on canvas. Yale University Art Gallery, New Haven

When Rome had received word of Germanicus' death, the people began observing a iustitium before the Senate had officially declared it. Tacitus says this shows the true grief that the people of Rome felt, and this also shows that by this time the people already knew the proper way to commemorate dead princes without an edict from a magistrate. At his funeral, there were no procession statues of Germanicus. There were abundant eulogies and reminders of his fine character and a particular eulogy was given by Tiberius himself in the Senate.

The historians Tacitus and Suetonius record the funeral and posthumous honors of Germanicus. His name was placed into the Carmen Saliare, and onto the curule seats that were placed with oaken garlands over them as honorary seats for the Augustan priesthood. His ivory statue was at the head of the procession during the Circus Games; his posts as priest of Augustus and Augur were to be filled by members of the imperial family; knights of Rome gave his name to a block of seats at a theatre in Rome, and rode behind his effigy on 15 July AD 20.

After consulting with his family, Tiberius made his wishes known whereupon the Senate collected the honors into a commemorative decree, the Senatus Consultum de memoria honoranda Germanini Caesaris, and ordered the consuls of AD 20 to issue a public law honoring the death of Germanicus, the Lex Valeria Aurelia. Although Tacitus stressed the honors paid to him, the funeral and processions were carefully modeled after those of Gaius and Lucius, Agrippa's sons. This served to emphasize the continuation of the domus Augusta across the transition from Augustus to Tiberius. Commemorative arches were built in his honor and not just in Rome, but at the frontier on the Rhine and in Asia where he had governed in life. The arch of the Rhine was placed alongside that of his father, where the soldiers had built a funerary monument honoring him. Portraits of him and his natural father were placed in the Temple of Apollo on the Palatine in Rome. Several cities in Asia Minor were named Germanicopolis in honor of the general (among them Gangra and Germanicia).

On the day of Germanicus' death his sister Livilla gave birth to twins by Drusus. The oldest was named Germanicus and died young. In 37, Germanicus' only remaining son, Caligula, became emperor and renamed September Germanicus in honor of his father. Many Romans, in the account of Tacitus, considered Germanicus to be their equivalent to Alexander the Great, and believed that he would have surpassed Alexander's achievements had he become emperor. In book eight of his Natural History, Pliny connects Germanicus, Augustus, and Alexander as fellow equestrians: when Alexander's horse Bucephalus died he named a city, Bucephalia, in his honor. Less monumental, Augustus' horse received a funeral mound, which Germanicus wrote a poem about.

=== Trial of Piso ===
Piso was rumored to have been responsible for Germanicus' death. As accusations accumulated, it was not long before the well known accuser, Lucius Fulcinius Trio, brought charges against him. The continued support of the Pisones and his own friendship with Piso made Tiberius hesitant to hear the case himself. After briefly hearing both sides, Tiberius referred the case to the Senate, making no effort to hide his deep anger toward Piso. Tiberius made allowances for Piso to summon witnesses of all social orders, including slaves, and he was given more time to plead than the prosecutors, but it made no difference: before the trial was over Piso died; ostensibly by suicide, but Tacitus supposes Tiberius may have had him murdered before he could implicate the emperor in Germanicus' death.

The accusations brought against Piso are numerous, including: (Note: Despite the exhaustive list only two statutes are mentioned: that of Piso violating the imperium of Germanicus, as Germanicus officially held greater authority despite both of them being of proconsular rank; and treason, which violated the lex Iulia maiestatis, for moving troops out of his province without authorization to wage war (Rowe 2002, p. 11 and Ando, Tuori & Plessis 2016, p. 340).)

- Insubordination
- Corruption
- Abandoning and reentering a province
- Summary justice
- Destroying military discipline
- Misusing the fiscus principis (emperor's money)
- Fomenting civil war
- Violating the divinity of Divus Augustus (sacrilege).

He was found guilty and punished posthumously for treason. The Senate had his property proscribed, forbade mourning on his account, removed images of his likeness, such as statues and portraits, and his name was erased from the base of one statue in particular as part of his damnatio memoriae. Yet, in a show of clemency not unlike that of the emperor, the Senate had Piso's property returned and divided equally between his two sons, on condition that his daughter Calpurnia be given 1,000,000 sesterces as dowry and a further 4,000,000 as personal property. His wife Plancina was absolved.

== Literary activity ==
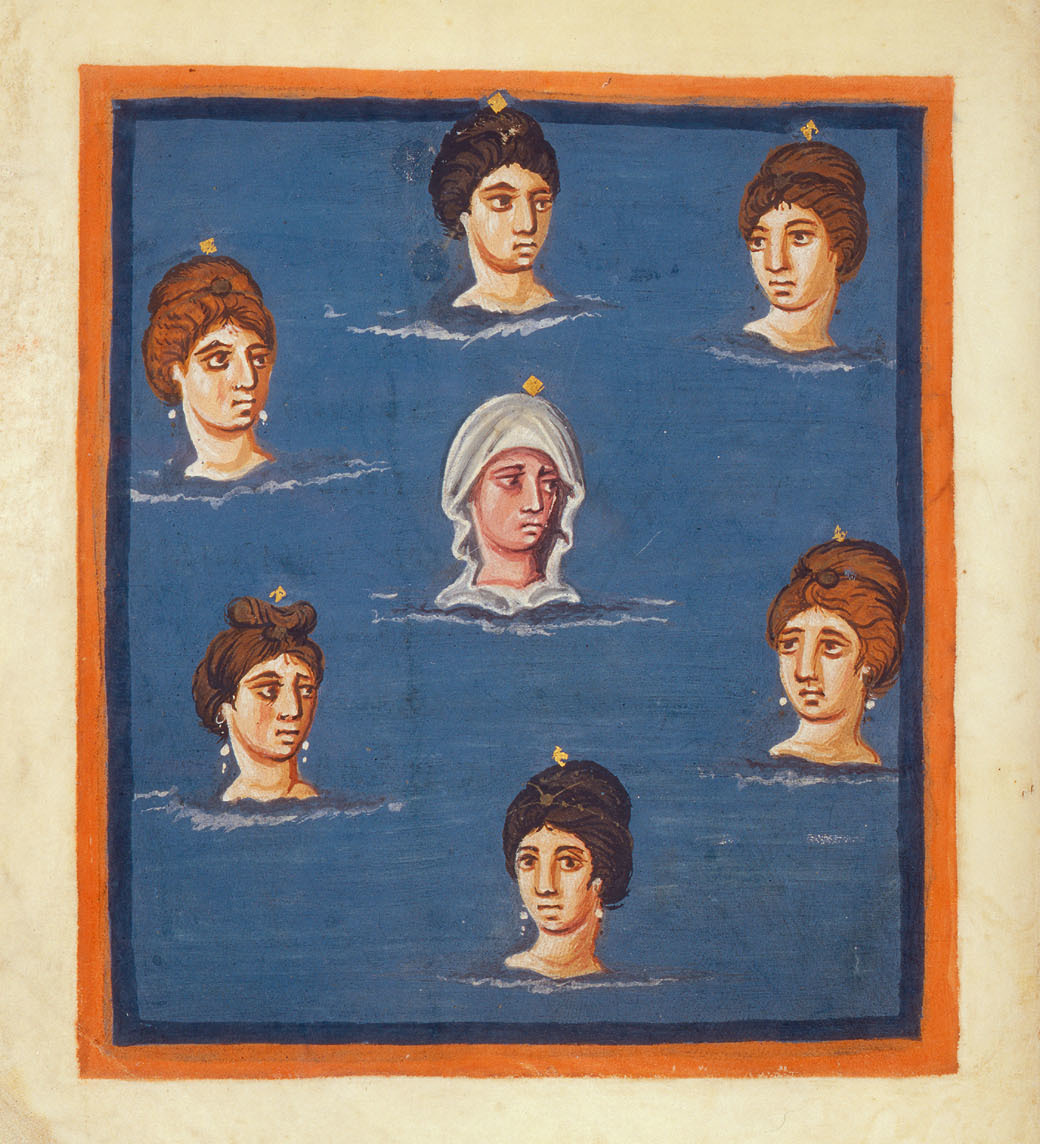
Pleiades of the Leiden Aratea, an illustrated manuscript of Germanicus' Phaenomena dating to the 9th century

In AD 4, Germanicus wrote a Latin version of Aratus's Phainomena, which survives, wherein he rewrites the contents of the original. For example, he replaces the opening hymn to Zeus with a passage in honor of the Roman emperor. He avoided writing in the poetic style of Cicero, who had translated his own version of the Phainomena, and he wrote in a new style to meet the expectations of a Roman audience whose tastes were shaped by "modern" authors like Ovid and Virgil. For his work, Germanicus is ranked among Roman writers on astronomy, and his work was popular enough for scholia to be written on it well into the Medieval era.

== Historiography ==
Germanicus and Tiberius are often contrasted by ancient historians and poets who wrote using themes found in drama, with Germanicus playing the tragic hero and Tiberius the tyrant. The endurance of the Principate is challenged in these narratives, by the emperor's jealous trepidation toward competent commanders such as Germanicus. Attention is paid particularly to their leadership styles, i.e., in their relationship with the masses. Germanicus is painted as a competent leader able to handle the masses whereas Tiberius is indecisive and envious.

Despite the poetics attached to Germanicus by ancient authors, it is accepted by historians such as Anthony A. Barrett that Germanicus was an able general. He fought against the Pannonians under Tiberius, quelled the mutiny in the Rhine, and led three successful campaigns into Germania. As for his popularity, he was popular enough that the mutinous legions of the Rhine attempted to proclaim him emperor in AD 14; however, he remained loyal and led them against the German tribes instead. Tacitus and Suetonius claim that Tiberius was jealous of Germanicus' popularity, but Barrett suggests their claim might be contradicted by the fact that, following his campaigns in Germany, Germanicus was given command of the eastern provinces – a sure sign he was intended to rule. In accordance with the precedent set by Augustus, Agrippa had been given command of those same provinces in the east when Agrippa was the intended successor to the empire.

=== Publius Cornelius Tacitus ===
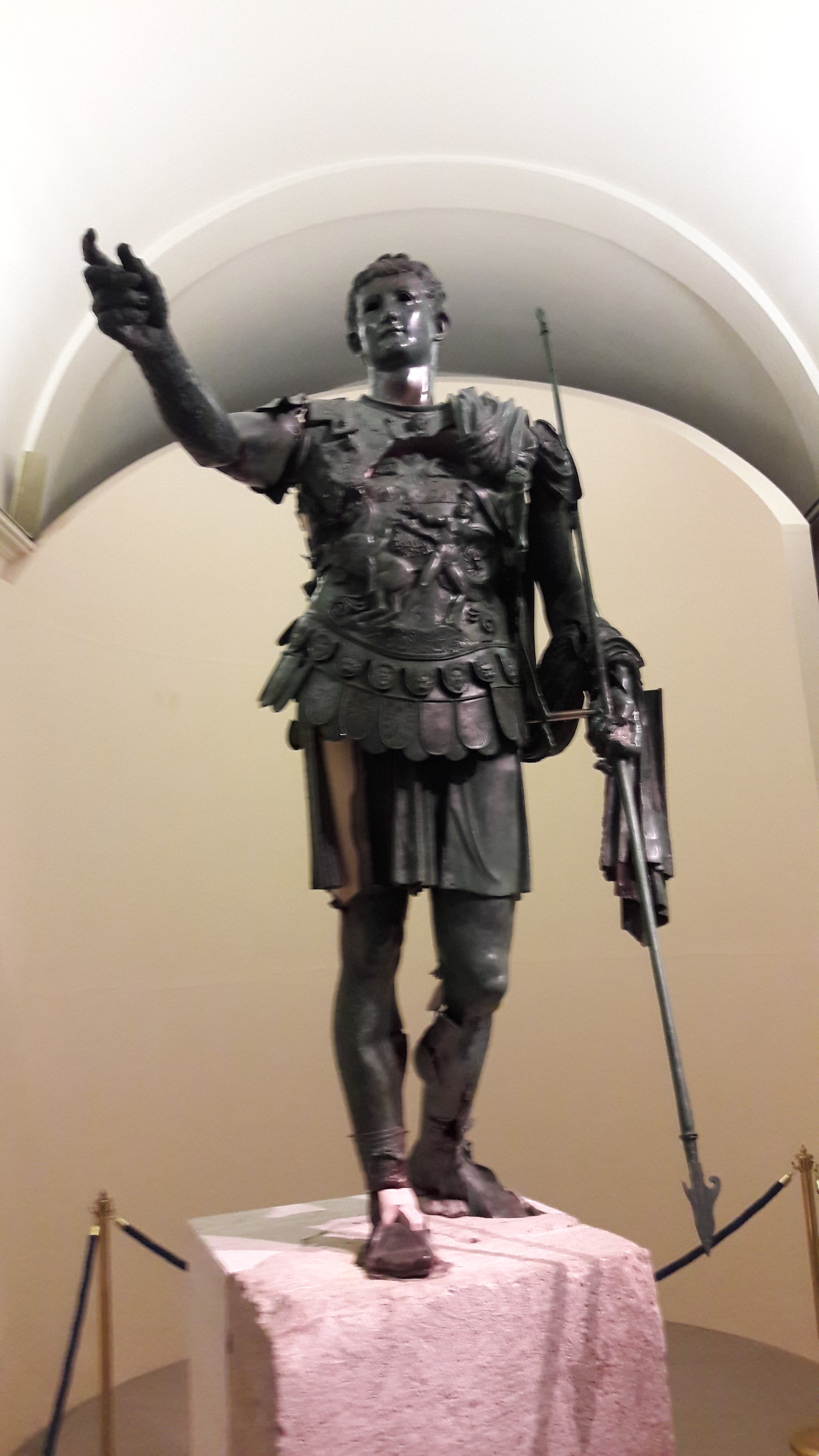
Bronze statue of Germanicus on display at Museo civico di Amelia, Amelia, Italy

The Annals by Tacitus is one of the most detailed accounts of Germanicus' campaigns against the Germans. He wrote his account in the early years of the second century. Tacitus described Germanicus as a fine general who was kind and temperate, saying that his early death had taken a great ruler from Rome.

Book 1 of Annals extensively focuses on the mutinies of the legions in Pannonia and Germany (AD 14). The riotous army figures into the unpredictable wrath of the Roman people giving Tiberius the chance to reflect on what it means to lead. It serves to contrast the "old-fashioned" Republican values assigned to Germanicus, and the imperial values possessed by Tiberius. The mood of the masses is a recurring theme, with their reactions to the fortunes of Germanicus being a prominent feature of the relationship between him and Tiberius well into the Annals (as far as Annals 3.19).

=== Gaius Suetonius Tranquillus ===
Suetonius was an equestrian who held administrative posts during the reigns of Trajan and Hadrian. The Twelve Caesars details a biographical history of the Principate from the birth of Julius Caesar to the death of Domitian in AD 96. Like Tacitus, he drew upon the imperial archives, as well as histories by Aufidius Bassus, Cluvius Rufus, Fabius Rusticus and Augustus' own letters.

The attitude of Suetonius toward Germanicus' personality and moral temperament is that of adoration. He dedicates a good portion of his Life of Caligula to Germanicus, claiming Germanicus' physical and moral excellence surpassed that of his contemporaries. Suetonius also says that Germanicus was a gifted writer, and that despite all these talents, he remained humble and kind.

== Legacy ==
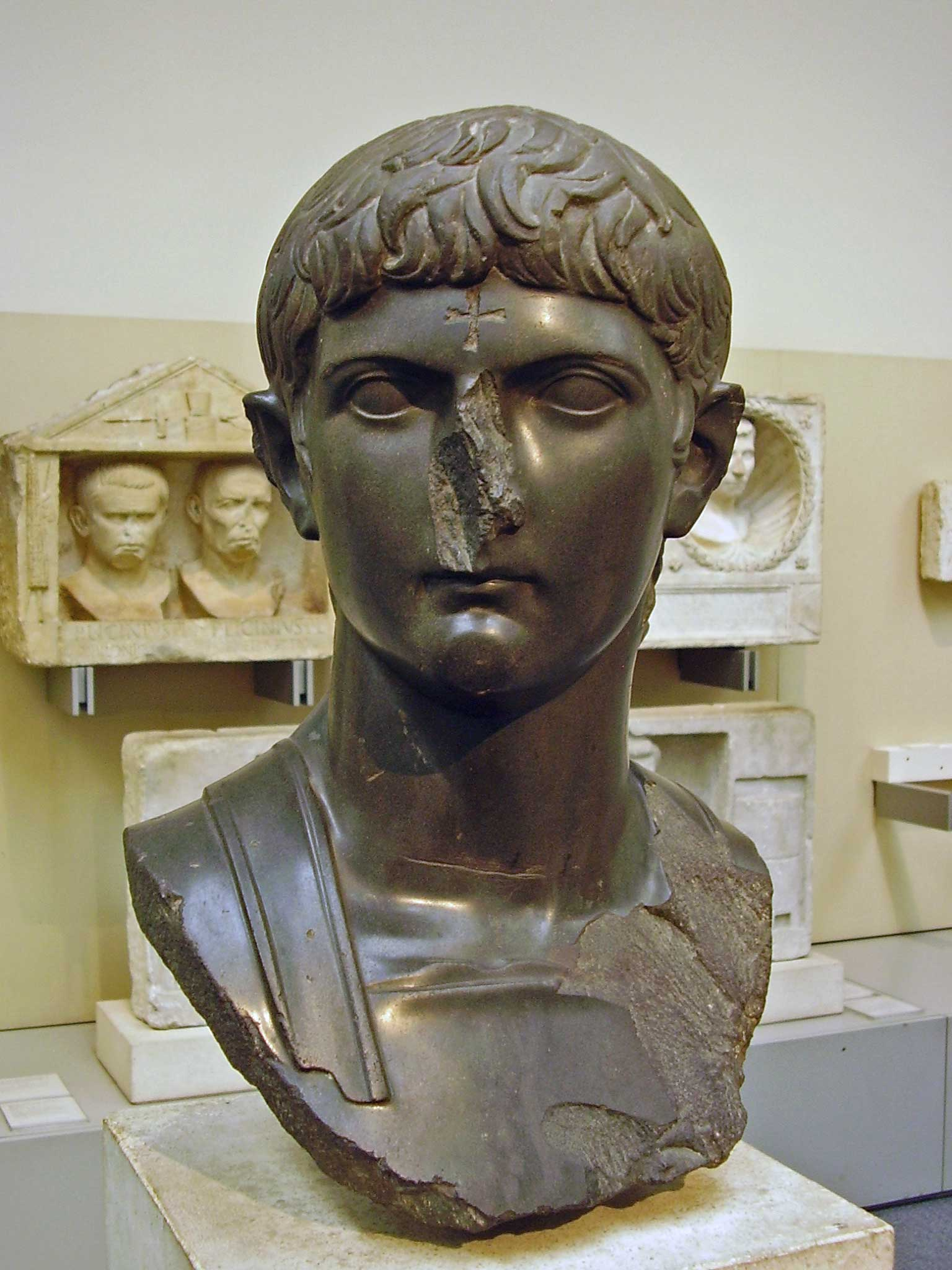
Bust of Germanicus, disfigured by Christians with a cross engraved on the forehead, British Museum

Due to his prominence as heir to the imperial succession, he is depicted in many works of art. He often appears in literature as the archetypal ideal Roman. His life and character have been portrayed in many works of art, the most notable of which include:

- Germanico in Germania (1732), an Italian opera by Nicola Porpora. He was played by Domenico Annibali.
- Death of Germanicus (1773–1774), a marble sculpture by British sculptor Thomas Banks.
- Thusnelda im Triumphzug des Germanicus (1873), a painting by German painter Karl von Piloty.
- I, Claudius (1934), a historical fiction novel by classicist Robert Graves.
- The Caesars (1968), a British television series by Philip Mackie. He was played by Eric Flynn.
- I, Claudius (1976), a British television series by Jack Pulman. He was played by David Robb.

== Sources ==
=== Primary sources ===
- Suetonius (2008), Edwards, Catherine (ed.), Lives of the Caesars, Oxford University Press, ISBN 978-0191609107
- Tacitus, Cornelius (2008), Barrett, Anthony (ed.), The Annals: The Reigns of Tiberius, Claudius, and Nero, Oxford University Press, ISBN 978-0192824219

=== Secondary sources ===
- Alston, Richard (1998), Aspects of Roman History AD 14–117, Routledge, ISBN 0-203-20095-0
- Ando, Clifford; Tuori, Kaius; Plessis, Paul J. du, eds. (2016), Oxford Handbook of Law and Society, Oxford University Press, ISBN 978-0-19-872868-9
- Attema, Paj; Bolhuis, E.; Lanting, Jn; Prummel, W. (2010), Palaeohistoria 51/52 (2009/2010) (in German), Barkhuis, ISBN 978-9077922736
- Barrett, Anthony A. (1993) [First published 1989 by B.T. Batsford], Caligula: The Corruption of Power (Paperback ed.), Routledge, ISBN 0-415-21485-8
- Barrett, Anthony A. (2015), Caligula: The Abuse of Power, Routledge, ISBN 978-0-415-65844-7
- Beard, Mary (2007), The Roman Triumph, The Belknap Press of Harvard University Press, ISBN 978-0-674-02613-1
- Bowman, Alan K.; Champlin, Edward; Lintott, Andrew (1996), The Cambridge Ancient History, Cambridge University Press, ISBN 0-521-26430-8
- Cascio, Elio Lo, ed. (2005), "The Domus Augusta and the Dynastic Ideology", The Cambridge Ancient History: Volume 12, The Crisis of Empire, AD 193–337, Cambridge University Press, ISBN 0-521-30199-8
- Chrystal, Paul (2015), Roman Military Disasters: Dark Days & Lost Legions, Pen & Sword Military, ISBN 978-1-47382-357-0
- Crook, J.A., ed. (1996), "Political History, 30 B.C. to A.D. 14", The Cambridge Ancient History: Volume X, The Augustan Empire, 43 B.C. – A.D. 69, Cambridge University Press, ISBN 0-521-26430-8
- Dando-Collins, Stephen (2008), Blood of the Caesars: How the Murder of Germanicus Led to the Fall of Rome, Wiley, ISBN 978-0470137413
- Dando-Collins, Stephen (2010), Legions of Rome, Quercus, ISBN 978-1-62365-201-2
- Dekker, Elly (2013), Illustrating the Phaenomena: Celestial Cartography in Antiquity and the Middle Ages, Oxford University Press, ISBN 978-0-19-960969-7
- Dyck, Ludwig Heinrich (2015), The Roman Barbarian Wars: The Era of Roman Conquest, Pen and Sword, ISBN 978-1473877887
- Dzino, Danijel (2010), Illyricum in Roman Politics, 229 BC–AD 68, Cambridge University Press, ISBN 978-0-521-19419-8
- Facos, Michelle (2011), An Introduction to Nineteenth-Century Art, Taylor & Francis, ISBN 978-1136840715
- Gibson, Alisdair (2013), The Julio-Claudian Succession: Reality and Perception of the "Augustan Model", Brill, ISBN 978-90-04-23191-7
- Heckel, Waldemar; Tritle, Lawrence A. (2009), Alexander the Great: A New History, Blackwell Publishing, ISBN 978-1-4051-3081-3
- Herbert-Brown, Geraldine (1994), Ovid and the Fasti: An Historical Study, Clarendon Press Oxford, ISBN 0-19-814935-2
- Levick, Barbara (1999), Tiberius the Politician, Routledge, ISBN 0-415-21753-9
- Levick, Barbara (2012), Claudius, Routledge, ISBN 978-0-41516619-5
- Lott, J. Bert (2012), Death and Dynasty in Early Imperial Rome: Key Sources, with Text, Translation, and Commentary, Cambridge University Press, ISBN 978-0-521-86044-4
- Mehl, Andreas (2011), Roman Historiography, translated by Mueller, Hans-Friedrich, Blackwell Publishers, Ltd., ISBN 978-1-4051-2183-5
- Meijer, J. W. (Trans.) (1990), Jaarboeken: Ab excessu divi Augusti Annales, Ambo, ISBN 978-90-263-1065-2
- Miller, John; Woodman, Anthony (2010), Latin Historiography and Poetry in the Early Empire: Generic Interactions, Brill, ISBN 978-90-04-17755-0
- Newcomb, Horace (1997), Encyclopedia of Television, Routledge, ISBN 978-0-203-93734-1
- Perrottet, Tony (2002), Pagan Holiday: On the Trail of Ancient Roman Tourists, Random House Trade Paperbacks, ISBN 0-375-75639-6
- Pettinger, Andrew (2012), The Republic in Danger: Drusus Libo and the Succession of Tiberius, Oxford University Press, ISBN 978-0-19-960174-5
- Possanza, D. Mark (2004), Translating the Heavens: Aratus, Germanicus, and the Poetics of Latin Translation, translated by Peter Lang, Classical Studies, ISBN 0-8204-6939-4
- Radman-Livaja, I.; Dizda, M. (2010). "Archaeological Traces of the Pannonian Revolt 6–9 AD: Evidence and Conjectures". In Aßkamp, Rudolf; Esch, Tobias (eds.). Imperium – Varus und seine Zeit. Internationalen Kolloquiumdes LWL-Römermuseumsam, 28–29 April 2008. Münster: Aschendorff Verlag. pp. 47–58.
- Robinson, Michael F.; Monson, Dale E. (1992), "Porpora Nicola (Antonio)", The New Grove Dictionary of Opera, vol. 3, Grove's Dictionaries of Music, ISBN 978-0-93585-992-8
- Rowe, Greg (2002), Princes and Political Cultures: The New Tiberian Senatorial Decrees, University of Michigan Press, ISBN 0-472-11230-9
- Rutledge, Steven H. (2013), A Tacitus Reader: Selections from Agricola, Germania, Dialogus, Historiae, and Annales, Bolchazy-Carducci Publishers, ISBN 978-1610411059
- Salisbury, Joyce E. (2001), Women in the Ancient World, ABC-CLIO, ISBN 978-1-57607-092-5.
- Seager, Robin (2008), Tiberius, John Wiley & Sons, ISBN 978-0470775417
- Shotter, David (2004), Tiberius Caesar, Routledge, ISBN 1134364180
- Simpson, Ch. J. (1981), "The Early Name of the Emperor Claudius", Acta antiqua Academiae Scientiarum Hungaricae, Magyar Tudományos Akadémia.
- Swan, Michael Peter (2004), The Augustan Succession: An Historical Commentary on Cassius Dio's Roman History, Oxford University Press, ISBN 0-19-516774-0
- Vahimagi, Tise; Grade, Michael Ian (1996), British television: an illustrated guide, Oxford University Press, ISBN 978-0-19-815926-1
- Ward, Allen M.; Heichelheim, Fritz M.; Yeo, Cedric A. (2010), A History of the Roman People (5th ed.), Prentice Hall, ISBN 978-0205846795
- Wells, Peter S. (2003), The Battle That Stopped Rome, Norton, ISBN 978-0-393-32643-7

Germanicus Julio-Claudian dynasty Born: 24 May 15 BC Died: 10 Oct 19
Political offices
Preceded by L. Cassius Longinus; T. Statilius Taurus	Roman consul 12 with G. Fonteius Capito	Succeeded by Gaius Silius; L. Munatius Plancus
Preceded by G. Vibius Marsus; L. Voluseius Proculus	Roman consul II; 18 with Tiberius	Succeeded by L. Seius Tubero; M. Livineius Regulus
