= Leiden Aratea =

Illuminated copy of an astronomical treatise by Germanicus

- Leiden University
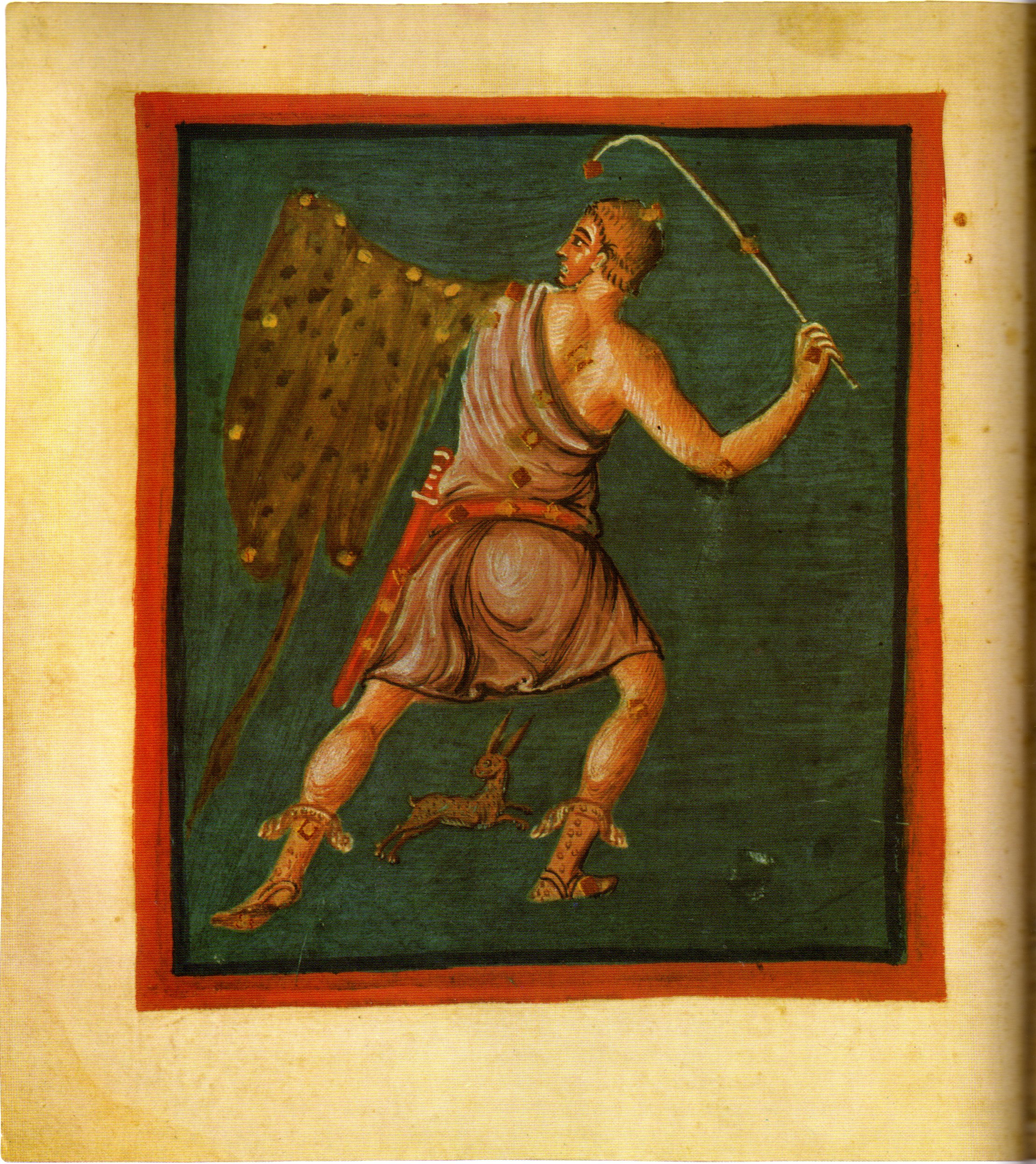
- Orion the hunter
- Date: Louis the Pious, Judith of Bavaria
- Language: Latin
- Size: 225 by 200 mm

Leiden University Library, VLQ 79, also called the Leiden Aratea, is an illuminated copy of an astronomical treatise by Germanicus, based on the Phaenomena of Aratus. The manuscript was created in the region of Lorraine and has been dated to around 816. It was produced at the court of Louis the Pious, who ruled from 814–840. It is one of the four Carolingian codices that were produced in his court. There are many translations and copies of this text, so it is very well known throughout the Middle East and Europe.

There are 99 extant folios measuring 225 by 200 millimetres (9 by 8 in); four were lost before 1600. Besides these four, the manuscript is complete. The work contains 39 miniatures, including some of the first artistic depictions on paper of the Greek constellations. The artist has made no effort to place the stars correctly according to their positions in the sky so the images cannot be considered true star charts.

== History ==
=== Provenance ===
The Leiden Aratea was created for a wealthy patron, possibly Louis the Pious or his wife Judith. Two copies were made of the manuscript in northern France around the year 1000. Jacob Susius acquired the manuscript in Ghent in 1573. It was owned by Hugo Grotius in 1600 and was used as a source for his edition of Syntagma Arateorum. The name Aratea means that it was a text derived from the lore of an astronomer whose name was Aratus of Soli (315–240BC).

Another copy of this codex is kept at the Annonciades municipal library in Boulogne-sur-Mer (France). The notice indicates that it comes from the Abbey of Saint-Bertin of Saint-Omer.

=== Facsimiles ===
During the Middle Ages, artists were specifically trained to copy each other. This resulted in a large number of exact copies of the same manuscripts.

A high-quality facsimile was published in 1989. That same year the book was rebound by Lucie Gimbrére, a Benedictine nun of Oosterhout.

A digital version of the Leiden Aratea is available at Leiden University Libraries' Digital Collections.

The copy of Boulogne-sur-Mer has also been digitized and is available online.

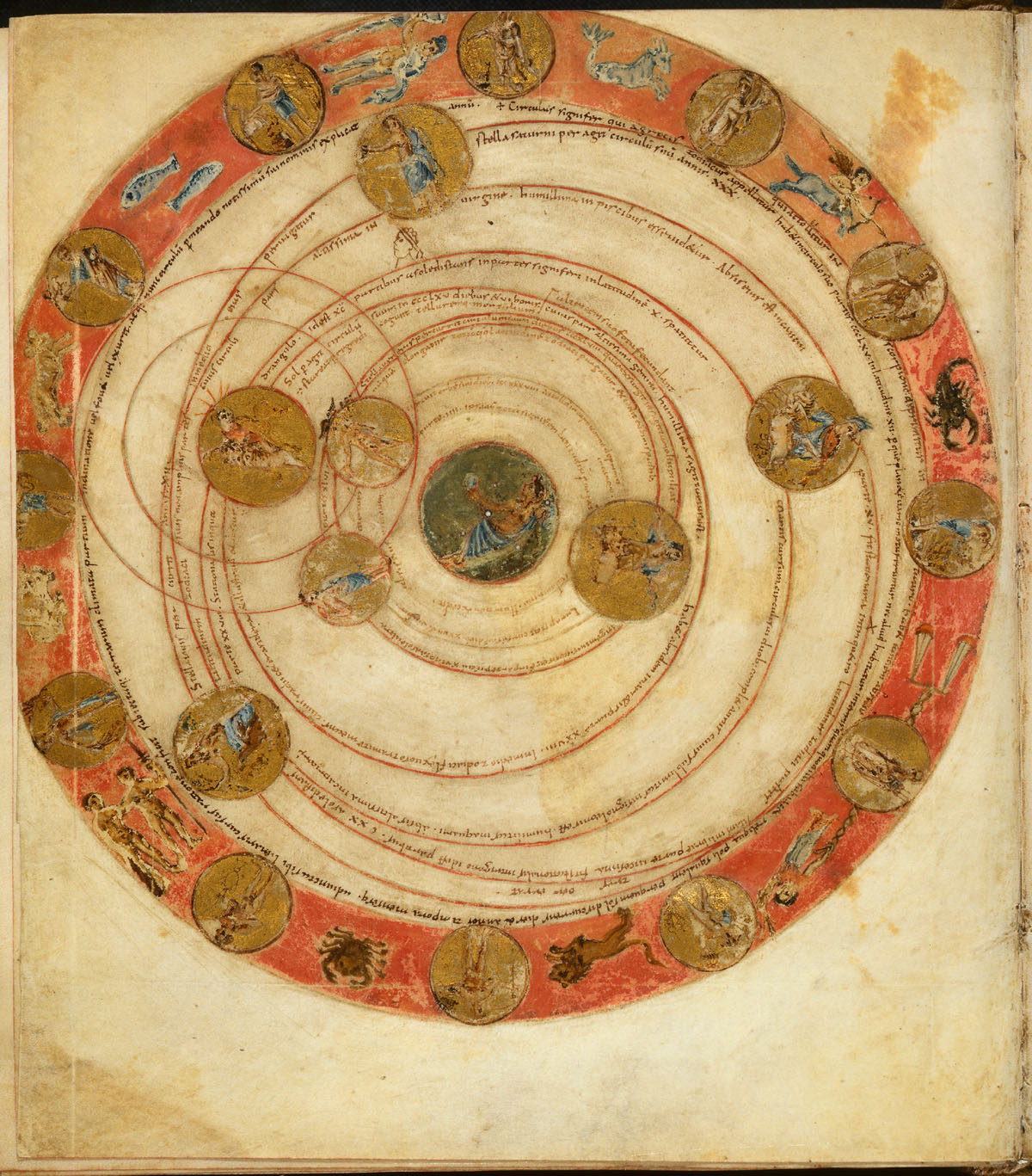
Geo-heliocentric planetarium with Mercury and Venus orbiting the Sun

== Scientific context ==
Scholars view this manuscript as interesting to the history of art and astronomy, but the majority of the scientific information in the manuscript is not technically correct. Some areas of interest to astronomers include the Leiden Planetary Configuration, which presents a partial heliocentric theory, with Mercury and Venus orbiting the Sun. This theory shows that among ancient astronomers there was a variety of theories being used that did not solely include the geocentric theory. The manuscript reflects the clarity of the night sky in the Middle Ages, a time without modern air pollution or light pollution. Medieval people generally had a much greater knowledge of the constellations than modern people do today.

== Description ==
=== Text ===
The text is written in the capitalis rustica script used by the Romans for literary manuscripts and kept by the Carolingians for secular works. The type of text was very common, and used often during these times. This text is taken from the Latin translations of Aratus's poem by Germanicus. Each image contains a text description underneath, so the manuscript is mostly considered a picture book. An exception to the use of the capitalis rustica script is folio 93v, the planetarium, where the routes of the planets are inscribed with quotes from Pliny the Elder's Natural History in Carolingian minuscule.

=== Miniatures ===
Constellations, planets and the seasons are depicted in 39 full-page miniatures, all on the verso pages, with corresponding poetical descriptions on the recto. It contains 42 constellations, but at least five miniatures are lost. The lost constellations and miniatures include the Sun and Moon, Jupiter, and the constellations of Centaurus and Virgo. The illustrations are probably copied from a Late Antique version of Germanicus' treatise; the subjects modeled in a "lively, illusionistic" manner typical of ancient painting. The missing constellations, Virgo Centaurus with Lupus and Corona Australis can be found in a different tenth-century copy of the Leiden Aratea located in the municipal library of Boulogne-ser-Mer. After the thirty six images of the constellations, there are two images which represent the five known planets at the time. Four male heads and one female head that are detached represent these five planets and they are described as "wandering stars" that "follow a different law." The five planets are Saturn, Mercury, Venus, Jupiter, and Mars. On a different page, four female heads represent the four changing seasons.

Folio 93v consists of a full-page planetarium. The planets paths are described along the lines in Carolingian minuscule. Around the border there are small figures that represent the zodiac signs, which is interesting because this is a copy from a fourth century manuscript called the Calendar of 354 instead of a copy from the Aratea.

Each picture contains a blue background with a red border, and the image central to the paper.

== Illuminations ==
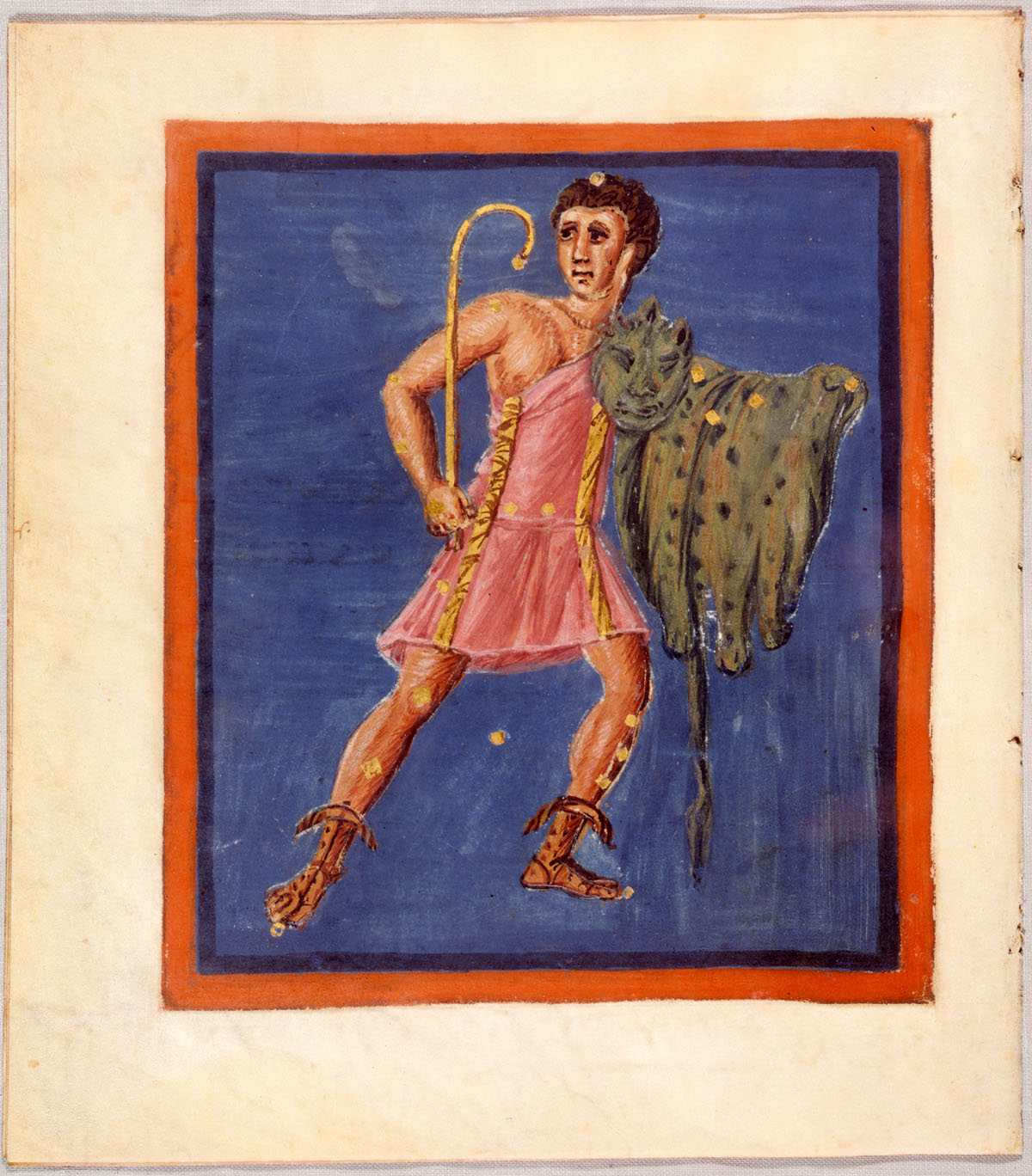
Hercules

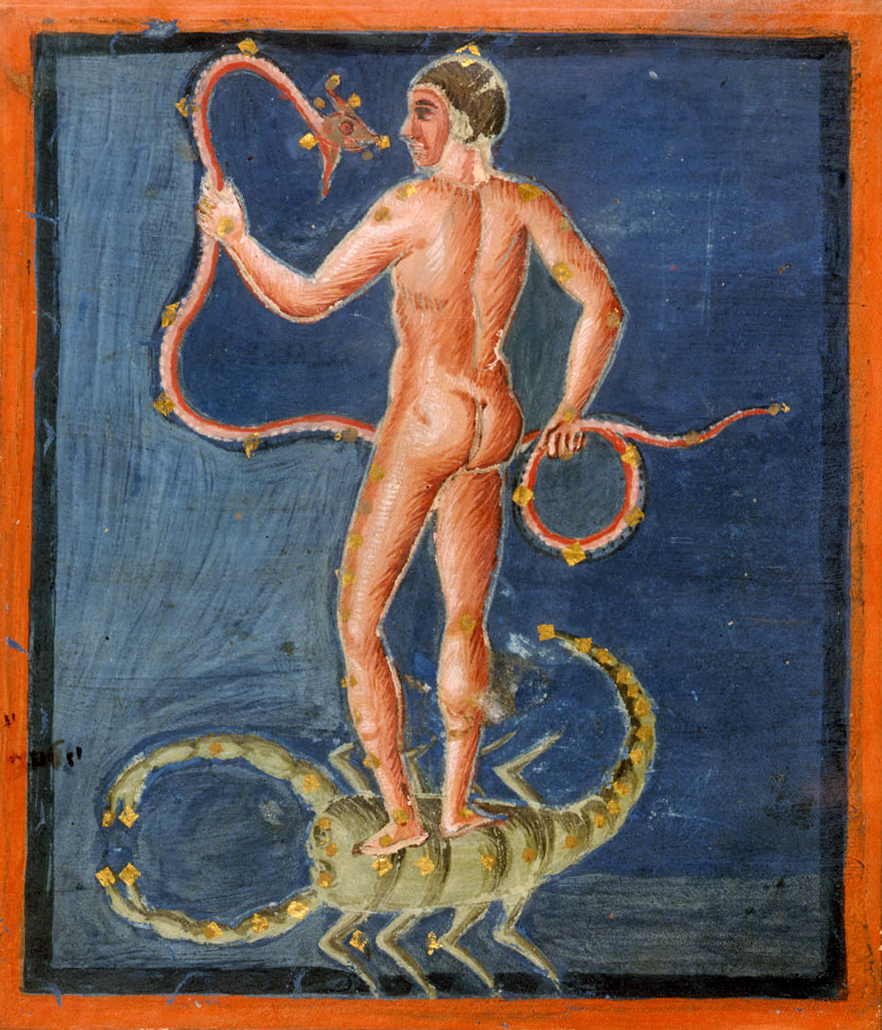
Ophiuchus, Serpens & Scorpius

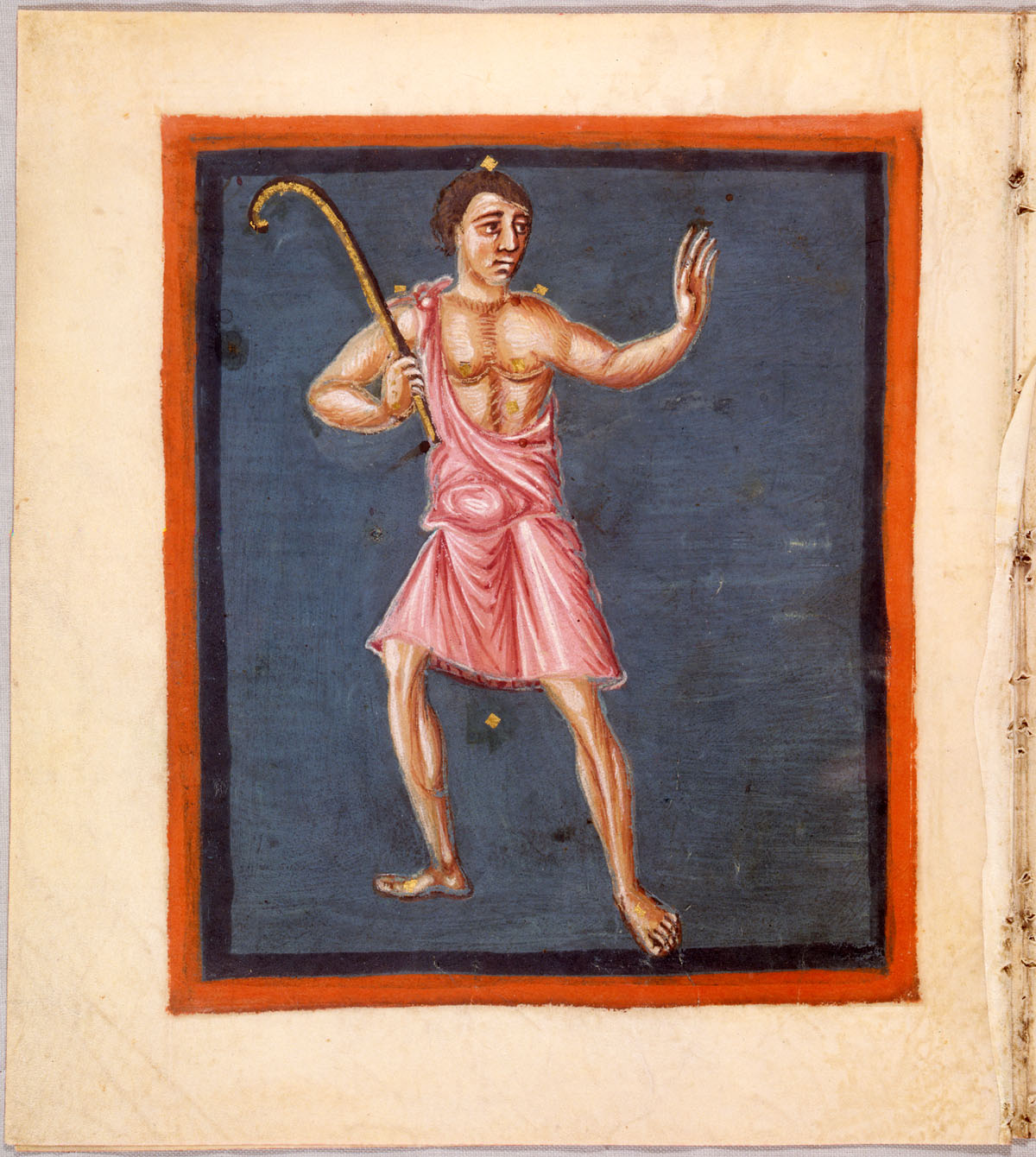
Boötes

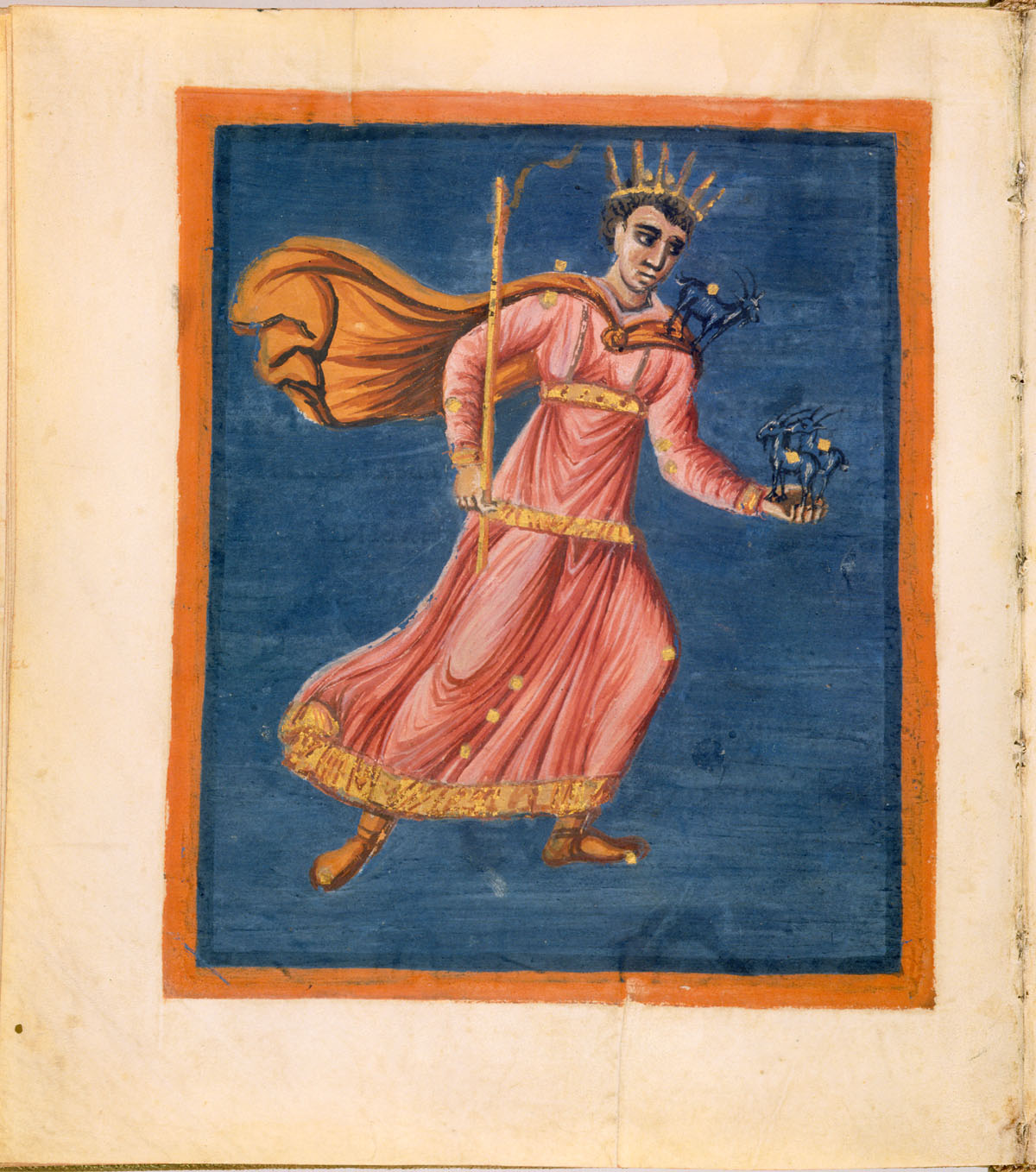
Auriga

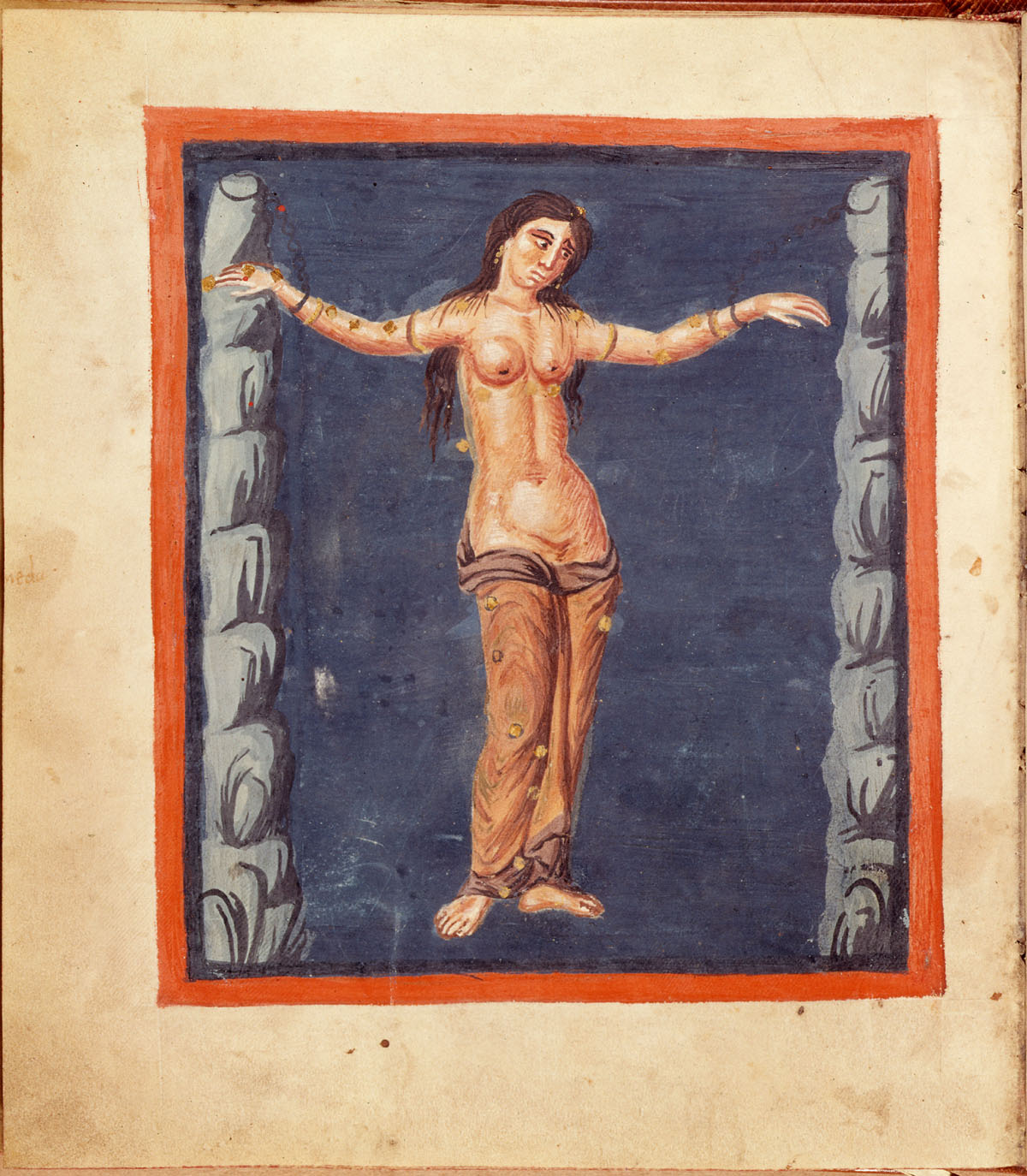
Andromeda

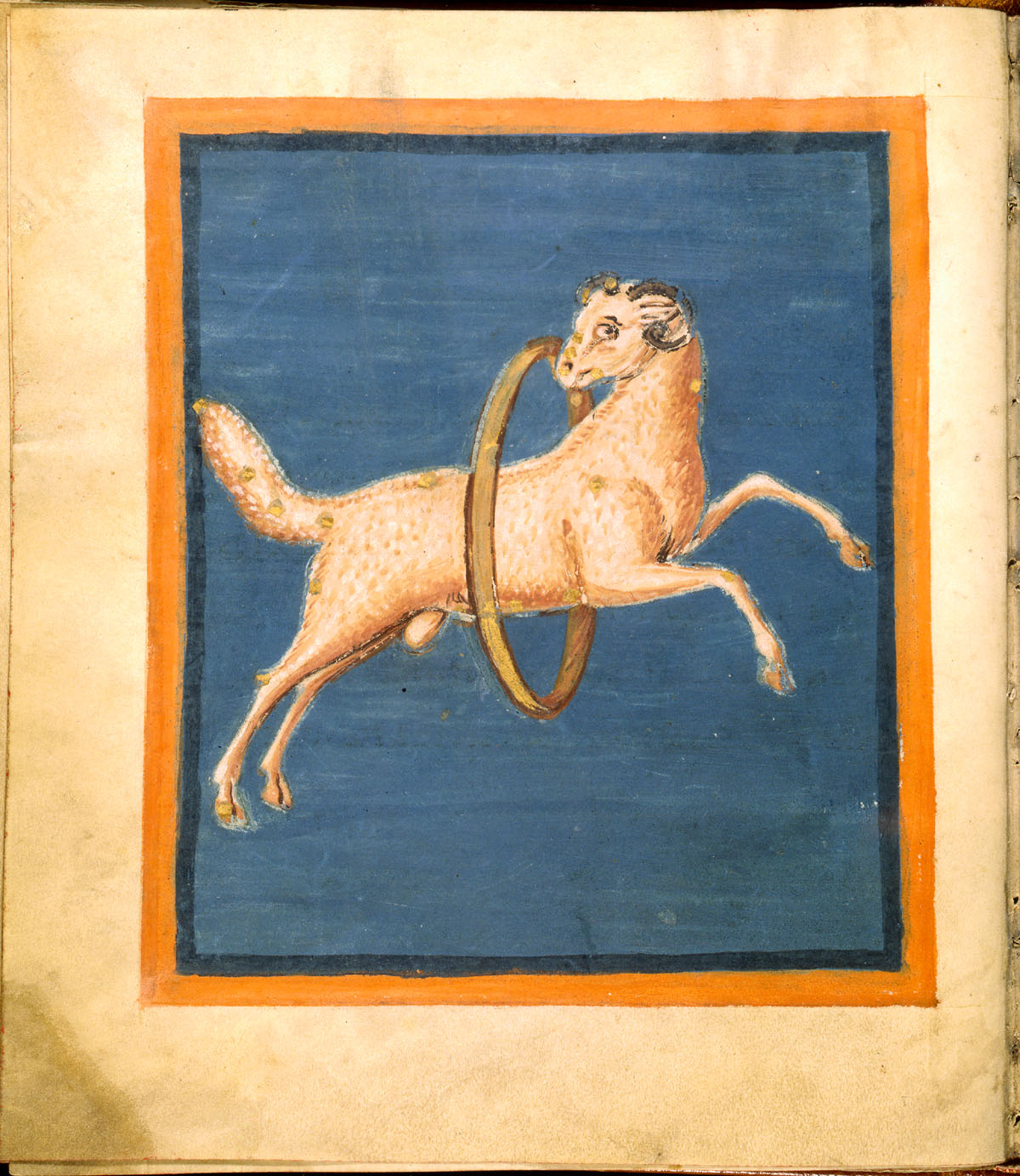
Aries

== Sources ==
- Walther, Ingo F. and Norbert Wolf. Codices Illustres: The world's most famous illuminated manuscripts, 400 to 1600. Cologne, TASCHEN, 2005. ISBN 3-8228-5852-8
- Katzenstein, Ranee; Savage-Smith, Emilie (1988). The Leiden Aratea: Ancient Constellations in a Medieval Manuscript. Getty Publications. ISBN 978-0-89236-142-7.
- de Hamel, Christopher (2016). Meetings with Remarkable Manuscripts. Allen Lane. ISBN 978-0-241-00304-6.
- Ridpath, Ian. "Illustrating the works of Aratus and Hyginus".
- Dekker, Elly. "The Provenance of the Stars in the Leiden 'Aratea' Picture Book." Journal of the Warburg and Courtauld Institutes, vol. 73, 2010, pp. 1–37.
- Gee, E. (2018). "Astronomical Facts or Poetic Form?" Journal for the History of Astronomy, 49(3), 396–397
- Weitzmann, Kurt, ed., Age of spirituality: late antique and early Christian art, third to seventh century, no. 190, 1979, Metropolitan Museum of Art, New York, ISBN 9780870991790; full text available online from The Metropolitan Museum of Art Libraries
- Dolan, M. (2007). The Role of Illustrated Aratea Manuscripts in the Transmission of Astronomical Knowledge in the Middle Ages, ProQuest Dissertations and Theses.
