= The Death of Germanicus =

Painting by Nicolas Poussin

- French: La Mort de Germanicus
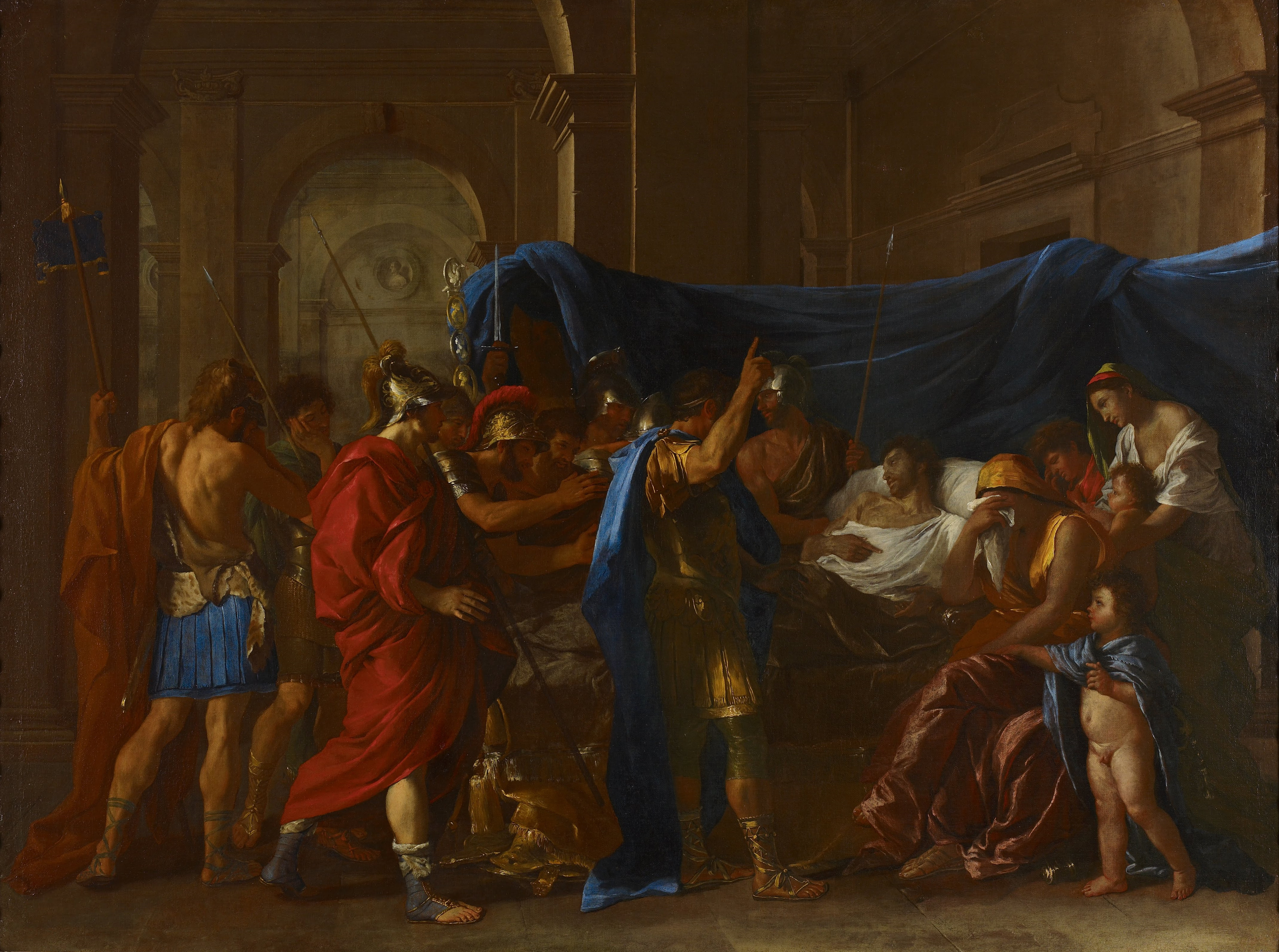
- Artist: Nicolas Poussin
- Year: 1627
- Medium: oil on canvas
- Dimensions: 148 cm × 198 cm (58 in × 78 in)
- Location: Minneapolis Institute of Art; Minneapolis

The Death of Germanicus is a painting made in 1627 by Nicolas Poussin for Francesco Barberini. It is kept at the Minneapolis Institute of Art.

== History ==
The painting was commissioned by Cardinal Francesco Barberini (1597–1679), nephew of Pope Urban VIII and legate in France. The order was probably placed in October 1626, returning from a diplomatic visit to Spain. He called on Nicolas Poussin, then a young painter who had recently settled in Rome since 1624, whom he may have known thanks to the poet Giambattista Marino, perhaps through the intermediary of the banker and patron Marcello Sacchetti. Barberini had already commissioned a Capture of Jerusalem (Israel Museum) from Poussin, painted around 1625-1626 and given as a gift to Cardinal Richelieu. The painting was delivered on January 21, 1628, and a receipt signed by the painter's hand indicates that he obtained the sum of 60 crowns for this work. The painting very quickly obtained a great echo because from the following February, Poussin was chosen to paint an altarpiece in Saint Peter's Basilica, The Martyrdom of Saint Erasmus.

The painting is given by Francesco to his nephew Maffeo Barberini (1631–1685), prince of Palestrina. It then remained in the collections of the Barberini Family in Rome and Florence until 1958. That year, it was acquired by the Minneapolis Institute of Art with the support of the William Hood Dunwoody Fund.

== Description ==
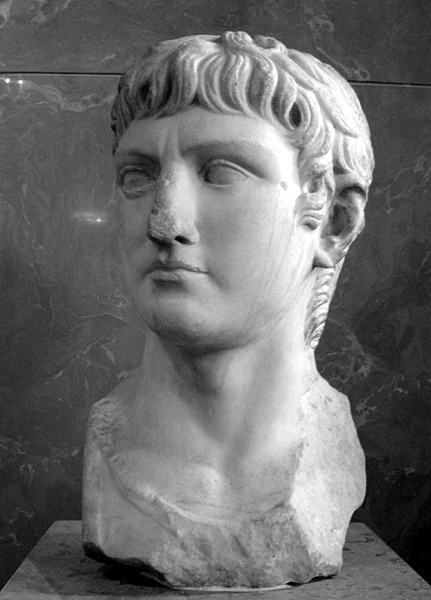
Bust of Germanicus (ca. 10)

=== Subject ===
Poussin is probably the first painter in history to examine this subject. This episode in the history of ancient Rome is taken from the Annals of Tacitus. It describes the military successes of the Roman general Germanicus, elder brother of Claudius, in the service of the Emperor Tiberius, especially against the Germans, which earned him his nickname. He was sent to fight in Syria, but there was opposition from Governor Gnaeus Calpurnius Piso. He made his wife Agrippina the Elder and the rest of his family swear to avenge his death, enjoying great popularity among the Roman people. Poussin undoubtedly learned of Tacitus' text through an Italian translation, which was numerous at the time in Rome.

=== Sources of inspiration ===
The general composition of the painting could have been borrowed from the Death of Meleager, represented on several ancient Roman sarcophagi present in Rome at the time of Poussin. A copy is kept in the Vatican Museums, another in the Capitoline Museums and yet another, currently in Wilton House but present in Rome at the beginning of the 17th century. The figure of Agrippina recalls the personifications of vanquished nations in Roman representations, such as vanquished Judea (judea capta).

In addition to ancient influences, he also uses motifs present in the painting of his time or slightly earlier: the soldier represented on the far left is a revival of the one represented on the extreme right of the Crusaders in front of Jerusalem by Ambroise Dubois (castle de Fontainebleau). It also uses the curtain from The Last Supper by Frans Pourbus the Younger (Musée du Louvre). Poussin's painting also seems to be inspired by The Death of Constantine, taken from a series of tapestries on the Life of Constantine from cartoons by Peter Paul Rubens, offered in 1625 by Louis XIII to Francesco Barberini.

=== Preparatory drawings? ===
Two drawings taking up the theme of the painting are attributed to Poussin. One is kept in the British Museum. Although very damaged, it already presents the main lines of the painting with a few variations: the soldier in the center does not extend his hand to the sky but holds the hand of Germanicus, thus remaining closer to the text of Tacitus. At the top left, two figures are shown climbing up a staircase, which are not included in the painting. The second drawing, kept at the Musée Condé in Chantilly, has many variations compared to the Minneapolis painting: the number of characters is different. According to the style of the drawing, Pierre Rosenberg and Louis Antoine Prat put forward the hypothesis that it is not a preparatory drawing but a later one, produced around 1630–1632 with a view to the development of a second painting on the same theme but probably never executed.

== Posterity ==
From the time of Poussin, the painting became famous in artistic circles and the painting was copied and commented on many times. However, it was not until the middle of the 18th century that the theme of Germanicus' death was taken up in the painting, but each time inspired by Poussin. He is thus represented by Piat Sauvage in 1774 and by Heinrich Friedrich Füger in 1789. If the subject is not taken up much by the artists, many are those who insert in their works allusions to Poussin's painting from this period. This is the case of Jean-Baptiste Greuze in his Septimius Severus and Caracalla in 1769 or, in a more subtle way, of Jacques-Louis David's Oath of the Horatii in 1785 who declares about him: "If it is to Corneille that I owe my subject, it is to Poussin that I owe my painting ”. François Marius Granet in his Death of Poussin (Granet Museum), assimilates the painter to the Roman general. Finally, he still inspired Eugène Delacroix in The Last Words of the Emperor Marcus Aurelius in 1844 (Musée des beaux-arts de Lyon).

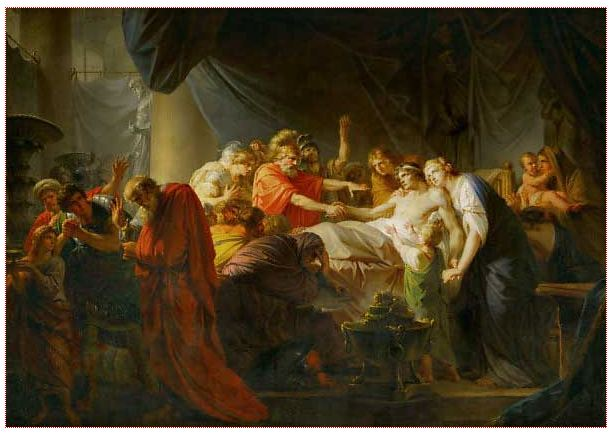
Heinrich Friedrich Füger - The Death of Germanicus (1789)

== See also ==
- List of paintings by Nicolas Poussin
