= Elly Dekker =

Dutch astronomer (born 1943)

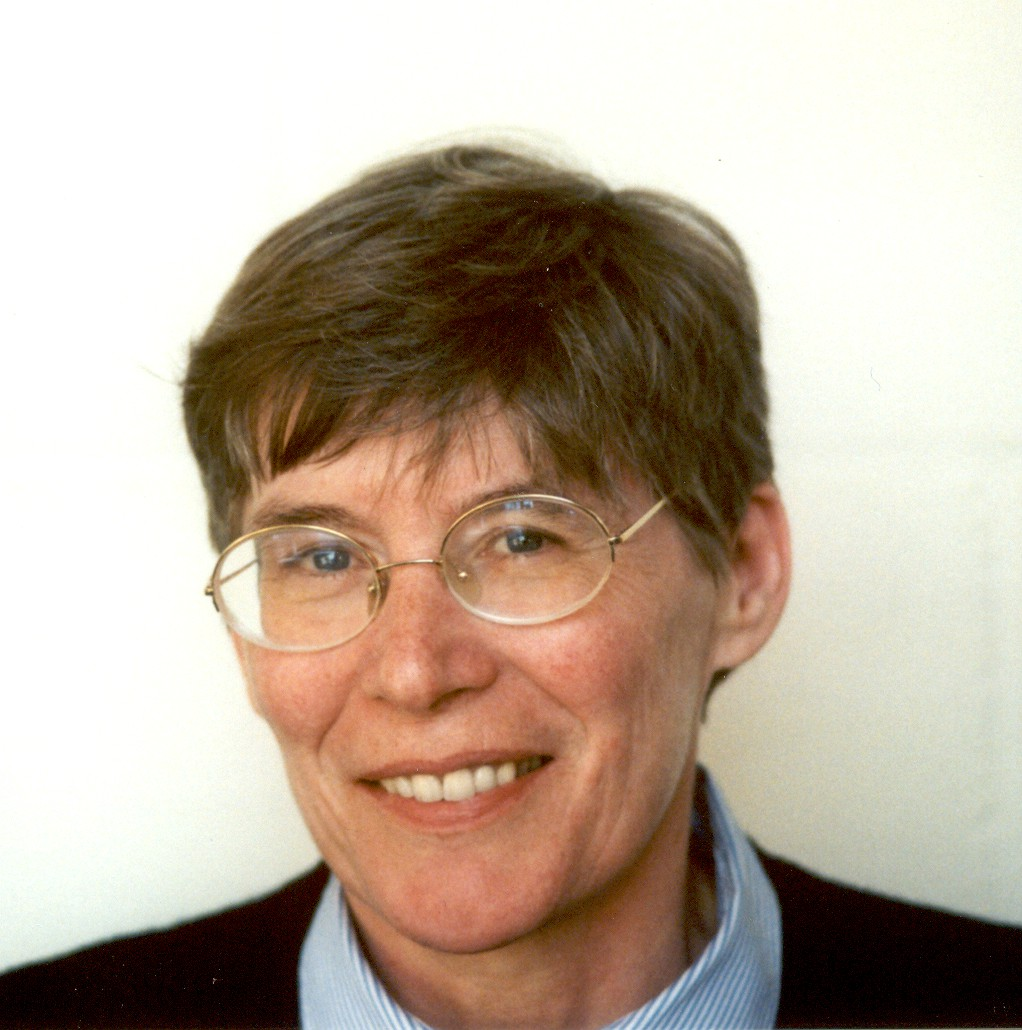
- Born: Elisabeth Dekker; 1943 (age 82–83); Haarlem, the Netherlands
- Education: University of Utrecht
- Awards: Caird Medal
- Scientific career
- Fields: Astrophysics, history of astronomy
- Workplaces: Museum Boerhaave, Royal Museums Greenwich

Elisabeth "Elly" Dekker (born 1943) is a Dutch astronomer and science historian, specialising in the history of astronomy.

== Biography ==
She studied theoretical physics and astronomy at Utrecht University. In 1975 she obtained a PhD in astronomy at Leiden University with the thesis Spiral structure and the dynamics of flat stellar systems supervised by Hendrik C. van de Hulst. From 1978 to 1988 she was a curator of Museum Boerhaave in Leiden and afterwards an independent scholar. From 1993 to 1995 she was a Sackler fellow of the Royal Museums Greenwich. In 1998 she was awarded the Caird Medal for her work on the globe collection of the National Maritime Museum in Greenwich.

Dekker was married to the astronomer and physicist Hendrik Gerard (Henk) van Bueren (1925–2012).

== Publications ==
Dekker is the author of articles and books including:

=== Articles ===
- 'Spiral structure and the dynamics of galaxies', Physics Reports 24 (1976) 315-389
- 'Jacobus C. Kapteyn (1852–1922)', in Kox, A.J. and Chamalaun, M. eds: Van Stevin tot Lorentz. Portretten van Nederlandse natuurwetenschappers, Amsterdam 1980, p. 177–191. In Dutch.
- 'Early Explorations of the Southern Celestial Sky', in Annals of Science 44 (1987) pp. 439–470. [About the mapping of the southern sky by Dutch mariners at the end of the 16th century.]
- 'Frederik Kaiser en zijn pogingen tot hervorming van ‘het sterrekundig deel van onze zeevaart', Gewina / Tijdschrift voor de Geschiedenis der Geneeskunde, Natuurwetenschappen, Wiskunde en Techniek TGGNWT 13 (1990) 23-41. In Dutch.
- 'An Unrecorded Medieval Astrolabe Quadrant, c. 1300', in Annals of Science 52 (1995), pp. 1-47.
- 'Carolingian Planetary Observations: The Case of the Leiden Planetary Configuration', Journal for the History of Astronomy 39 (2008) 77-90
- 'A ‘Watermark’ of Eudoxan Astronomy', Journal for the History of Astronomy 39 (2008) 213–228
- 'Caspar Vopel's Ventures in Sixteenth-Century Celestial Cartography', Imago Mundi 62:2 (2010) 161–190
- with Kristen Lippincott: The provenance of the stars in the Leiden Aratea picture book, Journal of the Warburg and Courtauld Institutes eds. E.H. Gombrich et al. 73 2010 (2011), 1–37
- 'Construction and copy: aspects of the early history of celestial maps’, Beiträge zur Astronomiegeschichte, Band 13, Acta Historica Astronomiae, Vol. 58 (2016), pp. 47–93.
- 'The Nuremberg maps: a Pythagorean-Platonic view of the cosmos', Beiträge zur Astronomiegeschichte, Band 13, Acta Historica Astronomiae, 58 (2016), pp. 95–124

=== Books ===
- Spiral structure and the dynamics of flat stellar systems, PhD thesis Leiden : Rijksuniversiteit, 1975. 148 p. : ill.; 24 cm.
- with Peter van der Krogt: Globes from the Western World, London, Zwemmer, 1993
- with Raf Van Laere: De verbeelde wereld. Globes, atlassen, kaarten en meetinstrumenten uit de 16de en 17de eeuw, [Antwerpen] Kredietbank 1997. In Dutch.
- Globes at Greenwich: a catalogue of the globes and armillary spheres in the National Maritime Museum, Greenwich, Oxford University Press, 1999)
- Catalogue of Orbs, Spheres and Globes, Istituto e Museo di Storia della Scienza, Cataloghi di raccolte scientifiche, 5. Firenze, Giunti, 2004 188 + 16 pp. of colour plates.
- Illustrating the Phaenomena: Celestial Cartography in Antiquity and the Middle Ages, Oxford University Press, 2013, 467 p.
