= Quintus Servaeus =

Roman governor of Commagene in 17 AD

Quintus Servaeus was a former praetor who was appointed by Germanicus to govern Commagene in 17 AD. In the spring of 20 AD he was involved in preparing an indictment of murder against Gnaeus Calpurnius Piso.
