= Michael F. Robinson =

English composer, musicologist and academic (1933–2026)

Michael Finlay Robinson (3 March 1933 – 18 February 2026) was an English composer, musicologist and academic best known for his scholarly work on Italian opera, particularly Neapolitan opera of the 17th and 18th centuries.

== Life and career ==
Robinson was born in Gloucester on 3 March 1933. He earned Bachelor of Arts, Bachelor of Music, Master of Arts, and Doctor of Philosophy degrees from New College, Oxford. In October 2009 he obtained the Oxford Doctor of Music degree by examination. He began his academic career in 1960 as Teacher of Harmony and Counterpoint at the Royal Scottish Academy of Music and Drama, Glasgow, before moving in 1961 to a Lectureship in Music at Durham University.

In 1965, he emigrated to Canada to join the Music Faculty at McGill University in Montreal as Assistant Professor, and was promoted to Associate Professor in 1967. Returning to the United Kingdom in 1970, he joined the Music Department at University College, Cardiff (now Cardiff University) as Lecturer, becoming Senior Lecturer in 1976 and Professor in 1991. He served as Head of Department from 1987 to 1994, retiring in 1994 and being named Professor Emeritus in 1995.

Robinson's research interests included 17th and 18th century Neapolitan music, opera studies, the sociology of music, opera house management, and theoretical aspects such as the concept of time in music.

His research was supported by grants from the Canada Council, the British Academy, the Leverhulme Foundation, the British Council, and the American Musicological Society. He has presented papers and lectures at universities and conferences worldwide, and directed a graduate summer school course on Neapolitan music at the Autonomous University of Barcelona in 1992.

Robinson died on 18 February 2026, at the age of 92.

== Selected publications ==
=== Books and monographs ===
- Robinson, Michael F. (1966). Opera Before Mozart. Hutchinson. ISBN 978-0090804221.
- Robinson, Michael F. (1972). Naples and Neapolitan opera. Oxford monographs on music. Oxford: Clarendon Press. ISBN 978-0-19-816124-0.
- Robinson, Michael F. (1972). "The Governors' Minutes of the Conservatory S. Maria Di Loreto, Naples". R.M.A Research Chronicle. 10: 1–97. doi:10.1080/14723808.1972.10540855. ISSN 0080-4460.
- Robinson, Michael F. (1972). Naples and Neapolitan opera. Oxford monographs on music. Oxford: Clarendon Press. ISBN 978-0-19-816124-0.
- Robinson, Michael F. (1994), Giovanni Paisiello. 2: The non-dramatic works, Thematic catalogues, Stuyvesant, NY: Pendragon Pr, ISBN 978-0-945193-60-9

=== Journal articles ===
- Robinson, M. F. (1961). "The Aria in Opera Seria, 1725–1780". Proceedings of the Royal Musical Association. 88: 31–43. doi:10.1093/jrma/88.1.31. ISSN 0080-4452.
- Robinson, M. F. "Porpora's operas for London, 1733–1736". Soundings 2 (2): 57–87.

=== Reviews ===
Robinson contributed reviews to The Musical Times, Music and Letters, Music Review, Haydn Yearbook, Times Literary Supplement, Early Music, The New Grove Dictionary of Opera, and The New Grove Dictionary of Music and Musicians.

=== Music editions ===
- Robinson, M. F. (1997). Giovanni Paisiello: Il Re Teodoro in Venezia [Performing edition]. Ricordi.

== Music compositions ==
- Sonata Movement for viola d'amore and pianoforte (originally 1960; later rearranged for viola and pianoforte)
- A Child's Vision of Night for soprano and pianoforte (1964)
- Six Fugues for harpsichord (1967–68)
- Credo and Gloria for 4-pt choir and organ (1968)
- String Quartet No 1 (1972)
- Three Settings of Thomas Hardy for baritone and pianoforte (1975)
- Duo for Violin and Pianoforte (1975)
- Three Settings of W.B. Yeats for tenor and pianoforte (1979)
- Duo for Two Pianos (1982–83)
- A Pretty How Town (words by E.E. Cummings) for baritone and eight instrumentalists (1984)
- Phoenix for oboe and pianoforte (1988, revised 1993)
- Three Songs about Love for baritone and pianoforte (1985–94)
- Two Songs for Cherry Willingham for children's voices and pianoforte (1994–96)
- Fantasy for Solo Violoncello (1997)
- Blessed Art Thou, O God, anthem for unaccompanied 8-pt choir (2001)
- The House of Bernarda Alba, opera in 2 acts (1997–2004)
- A Welsh Garland, suite for wind band (2005–06)
- The Bells of Ieud for pianoforte solo (2007)
- Four Sonnets for soprano and pianoforte (2008)
- Fantasia on Phrases of Fartein Valen for pianoforte solo (2010)
- A Gloucester Lad for tenor and orchestra (2013–14)
- String Quartet 2 (2015–16)
- Exordium and Exeat for organ (2018–19)
