= Germanicus's expedition into Germania =

Roman military expedition

- Part of the Germanic Wars
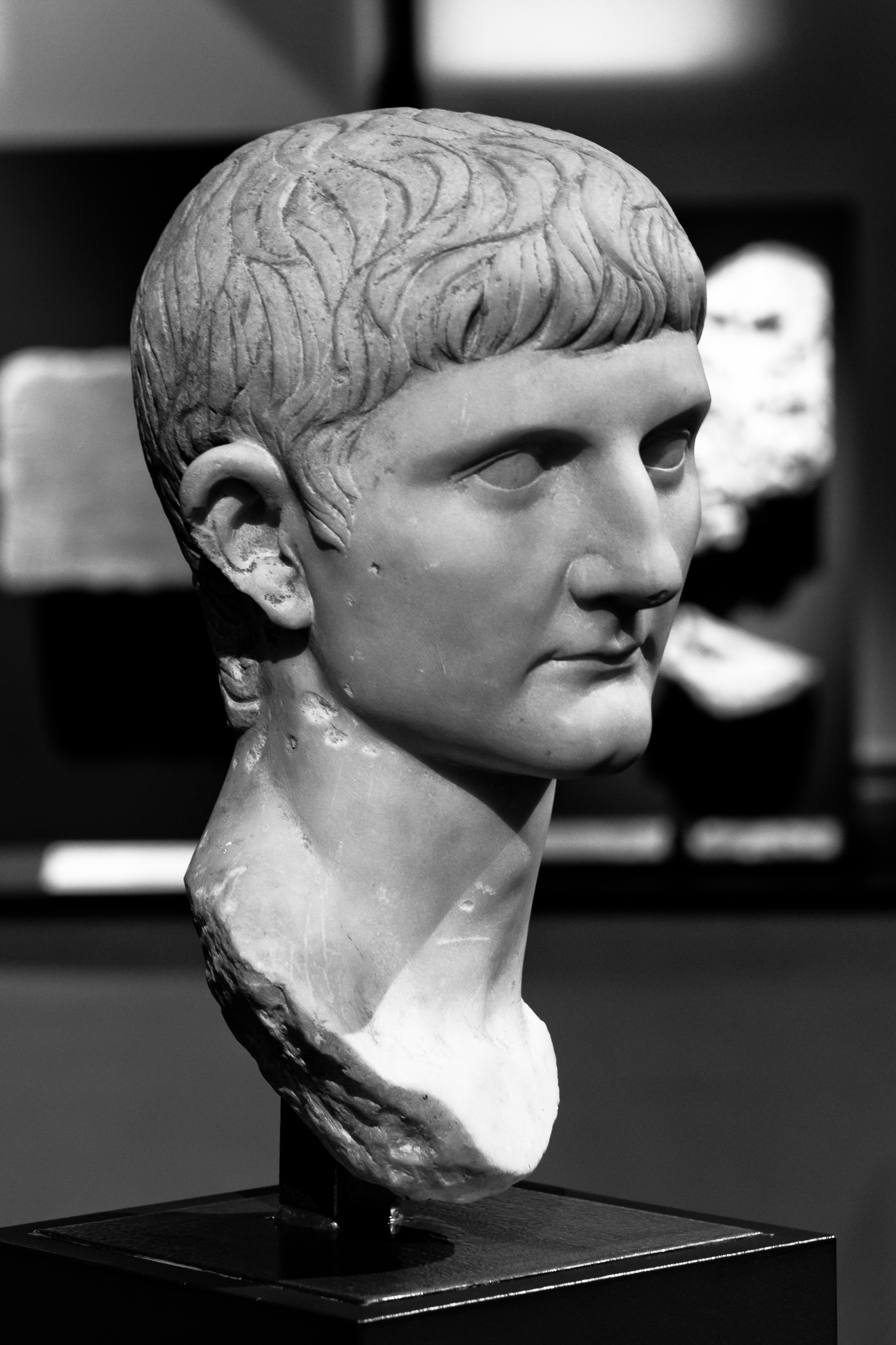
- Bust of Germanicus.
Date	14–16 AD
Location	Province of Germania (Germania Magna)
Result	Roman victory (Tacitus); See section for details

Belligerents
Roman Empire	Germanic tribal coalition led by the Cherusci

Commanders and leaders
Emperor Augustus; Germanicus; Caecina Severus	Arminius; Inguiomer

Strength
8 legions and numerous allied Gallic and Germanic auxiliary units (80,000 men along the Rhine)	40–50,000 tribal men
- see section for details

Casualties and losses
20–25,000 deaths (modern est.)	Extremely heavy
- see section for details

Germanicus' expedition into Germania was a Roman military expedition from 14 to 16 AD against a coalition of Germanic tribes on the right bank of the Rhine. The campaigns are named after Nero Claudius Germanicus (born 15 BC; died 19 AD), the great-nephew of Augustus. The main opponents were the Cherusci under the leadership of Arminius (born c. 17 BC; died c. 21 AD).

== The sources ==
=== The Annals of Tacitus ===
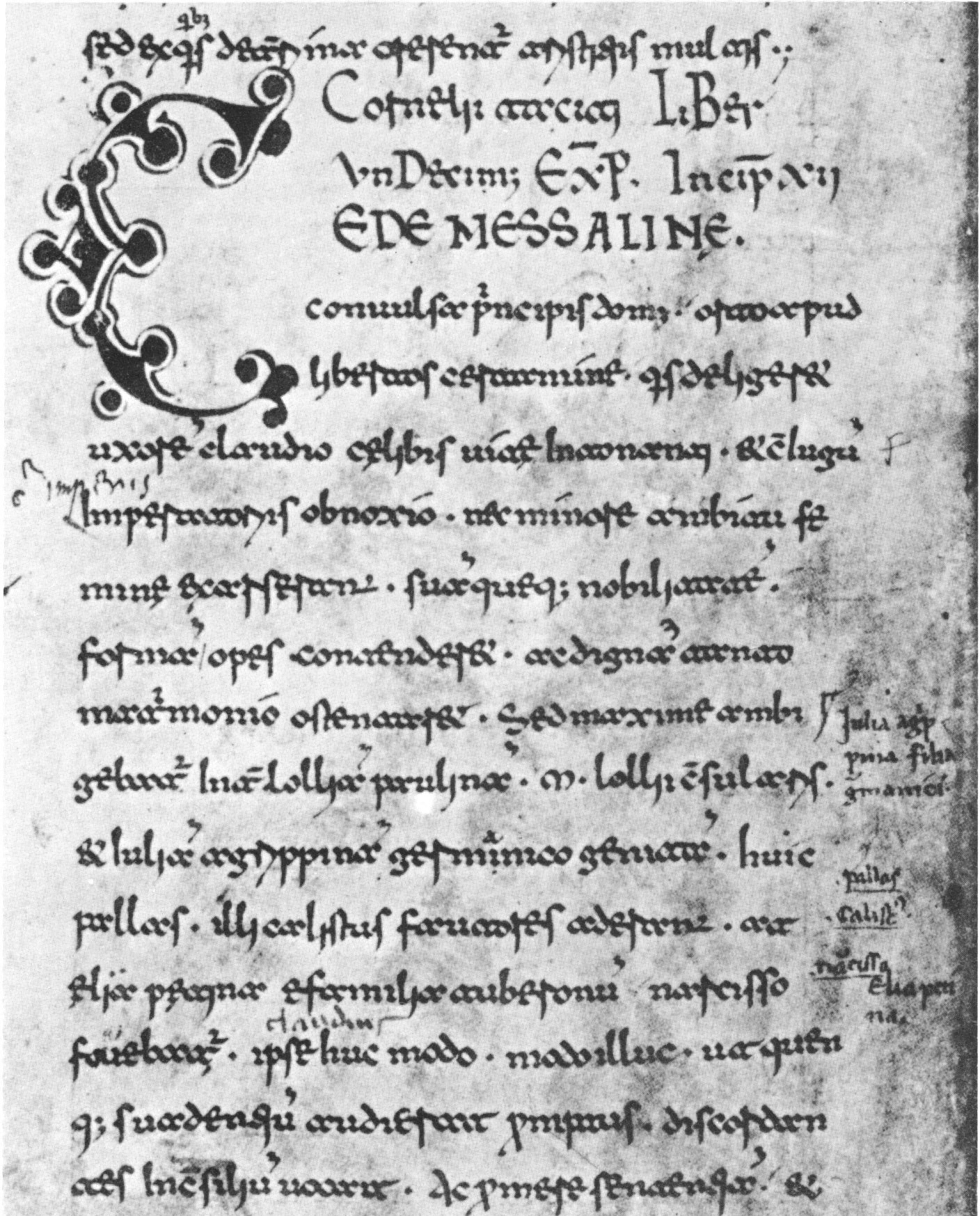
Tacitus, Annales, Beginning of the 12th book in the Florence manuscript, Biblioteca Medicea Laurenziana, Plut. 68,2 fol. 6v (1st half of the 11th century).

The ancient authors hardly addressed the campaigns of Germanicus and at most reported on the triumphal procession of Germanicus in 17 AD, for example Cassius Dio or Strabo. The campaigns were not considered memorable because they were unsuccessful, contrary to the image that the victory propaganda tried to convey. Publius Cornelius Tacitus (born c. 58 AD; diad c. 120 AD) was also aware of the futility of Germanicus' expedition. Nevertheless, he devoted large parts of the first two books of his Annals to these campaigns and thus left behind one of the most detailed descriptions of ancient military campaigns ever.

The Annals describe Roman history from the death of Augustus (19 August 14 AD) and the accession of Tiberius to power. This literary late work of Tacitus was written around 100 years after the events. The sources that Tacitus used to prepare the Germanicus passages are now lost. He probably had at his disposal the 20-book Bella Germaniae ["Germanic Wars"] by Pliny the Elder, who had served as an officer in Germania in the middle of the 1st century. The Libri belli Germanici ["Books of the Germanic Wars"] by the contemporary witness Aufidius Bassus may also have been included. Tacitus also evaluated Senate records and other official sources. Tacitus was generally well informed. He may also have lived in Cologne for a while and knew the Roman-Germanic border region from his own experience.

The first six books of the Annals are preserved in a medieval copy from the Monastery of Fulda, the Codex Laurentianus. The codex was carefully prepared and probably faithfully reproduces its original. The Annals are generally considered to be a reliable source. The Tabula Siarensis, a bronze memorial tablet found in Spain in 1981, which was made in 19 AD in honour of Germanicus, who died that year and contains a list of his achievements, confirms the reports on the triumphal procession in 17 AD and in important respects proves Tacitus's almost documentary working method.

Tacitus did not create a war report or a retracing of Roman military campaigns, as was the case in Julius Caesar's De bello Gallico ["Gallic War"], for example. Rather, he was concerned with portraying people, their feelings and their fates in powerful images and dramatic actions. He did not provide all the information necessary to understand the course of the war and assumed that the reader had extensive knowledge of the context. Moreover, the enormous literary condensation of the text often prevents full certainty in understanding the passage. This makes the interpretation of the military operations difficult. The description of the campaign in the summer of 16 AD is one of the most discussed passages in the Annals.

=== The Conflict between Tiberius and Germanicus in Tacitus ===
The domestic political thread of the description is the growing tensions between the popular Germanicus and the unpopular Emperor Tiberius. Tacitus' sympathies clearly lie with the "young 'hero'". Nevertheless, Germanicus is not glorified in a one-sided way. Tacitus also allows Tiberius to speak at length. The historian must have considered Tiberius' arguments to be reasonable - "Tacitus' head [inclined] to Tiberius and his heart to Germanicus", as the ancient historian Dieter Timpe judges.

Tacitus was influenced by the historiography of the Claudian period of the Julio-Claudian dynasty (41–54 AD). Emperor Claudius was the brother of Germanicus, and the judgment of the Claudian historians, including Pliny the Elder, was accordingly favorable. There were also parallels with the life of Gnaeus Julius Agricola, whom Tacitus admired. Agricola was Roman governor in Britain (77–84 AD) and father-in-law of Tacitus. He suffered similar things under Domitian as Germanicus did under Tiberius.

== Historical context ==
=== Rise of Tiberius, 4 AD ===
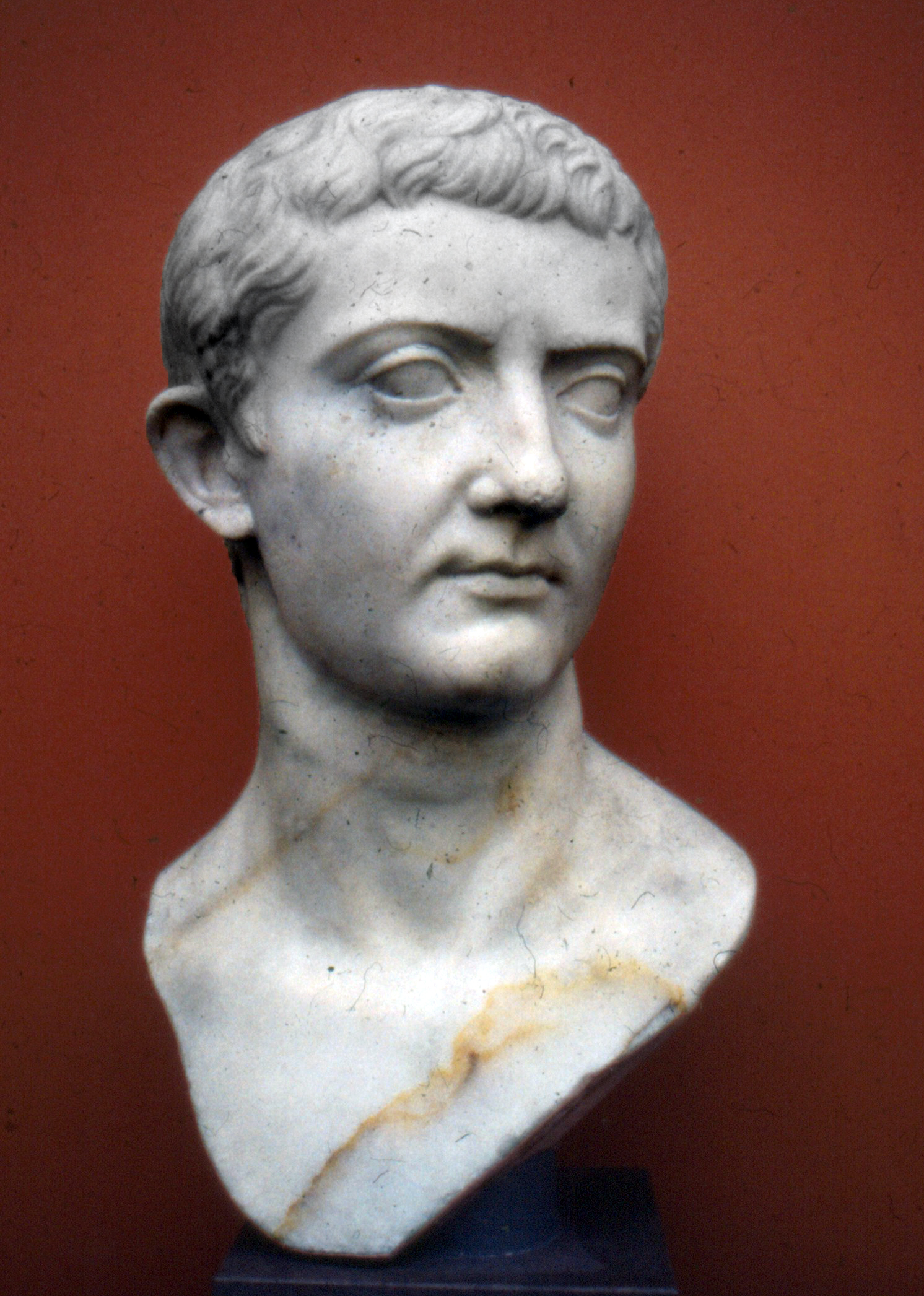
Bust of Tiberius Julius Caesar Augustus.

Tiberius, on his return from voluntary exile, had been adopted by Augustus. The princeps forced him, however, to adopt his nephew Germanicus Julius Caesar, son of his brother Drusus Major, although Tiberius already had a son, conceived by his first wife, Vipsania, named Drusus Minor and only a year younger. The adoption was celebrated on 26 June of 4 AD with great festivities and Augustus ordered that over a million sesterces be distributed to the troops. The return of Tiberius to supreme power gave, in fact, not only a natural stability, continuity and internal harmony to the Principate, but also a new impetus to the Augustan policy of conquest and glory outside the imperial borders.

=== Reorganization after Teutoburg Forest, 9 AD ===
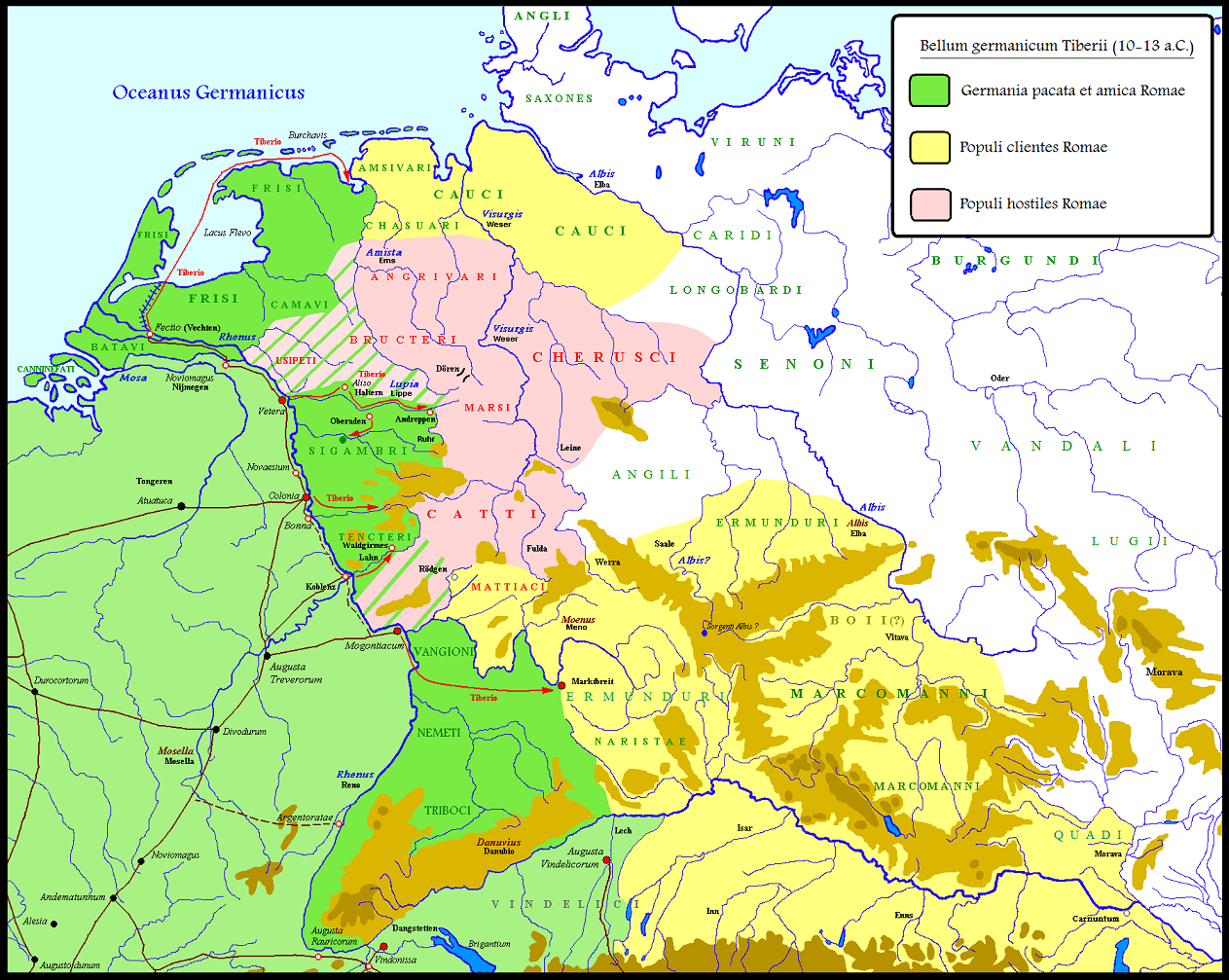
Tiberius' campaigns of 10/11–13 AD. In pink, the Germanic, anti-Roman coalition. In dark green, territories still directly held by the Romans, in yellow the Roman client states (such as the Marcomanni of Maroboduus).

Germanic troops under the leadership of the prince of fhe Cherusci, Arminius, had defeated Publius Quinctilius Varus' three legions (XVII, XVIII and XIX) in the autumn of 9 AD at the Saltus Teutoburgensis (Teutoburg Forest). Three of the five legions stationed on the Rhine had been destroyed. The Roman Emperor Augustus immediately sent his adopted son, the crisis-proven Tiberius, over the Alps to stabilize the situation, fearing that the Germanic tribes could use the opportunity to invade Gaul or even Italy proved to be unfounded.

In 10 AD, the two remaining legions were supplemented by six more, whose combat value was initially doubtful. On the Lower Rhine there were now the Legio I Germanica, the V Alaudae, the XX Valeria Victrix and the XXI Rapax, while on the Upper Rhine there were the Legio II Augusta, the XIII Gemina, the XIV Gemina and the XVI Gallica. It is uncertain whether the legions I and V were the ones that had escaped the catastrophe of the previous year, or the XIII and XIV.

The auxiliaries were also considerably strengthened. Tacitus reports 26 cohorts and 8 alae for the year 14 AD. Overall, the army strength on the Rhine from 10 AD onwards was probably around 80,000 men. In addition, allied tribes provided warrior units of unknown size in the event of war.

=== Measures of Tiberius, until 12 AD ===
Military operations with increasing depth of advance are recorded for the years 11 and 12 AD. The legionaries rebuilt bases on the right bank of the Rhine, built limites (wide clearings) and created a deserted strip east of the Rhine. Fleet operations on the North Sea secured the loyalty of the coastal tribes.

Tiberius was extremely cautious: he listened to the suggestions of a war council, as Suetonius reports, and personally checked the load of the baggage train: nothing superfluous should burden the marching columns. The general did not want to be guilty of the negligence of Varus. In the field, Tiberius led a Spartan life, gave all orders in writing, insisted on the strictest discipline and reactivated old punishments. The general refrained from risky ventures, respected the limits of feasibility and consistently adhered to what Caesar had described as the "rule and custom of the Roman army" [ratio et consuetudo exercitus Romani].

In 12 AD, Tiberius escaped an assassination attempt by a Bructerian. The assassin had infiltrated the general's entourage, but his behavior exposed him. In the autumn, Tiberius traveled to Rome and celebrated his triumph over Illyria, which had had to be postponed in 9 AD. His departure from Germania was to be final. Tiberius remained at the 75-year-old's side as Augustus' designated successor. Augustus gave supreme command [imperium proconsulare] over the largest Roman army of the time to the almost thirty-year-old Germanicus.

=== Germanicus as commander, from 14 AD ===
Germanicus was the son of Nero Claudius Drusus (born 38 BC; died 9 BC), who had started the Augustan Germanic Wars in 12 BC with his campaigns and had died in an accident shortly after reaching the Elbe, in around September or October, (Note: An earlier date is unlikely because the army was already on the way back to its winter camp. What speaks against a later month is that Tiberius does not seem to have been hindered by the autumn weather during his ride. See: Johne 2006, p. 103.) in an unknown location between the Rhine and Saale, probably still in Cherusci territory. Strabo and other authors, such as Florus, mention his death but not the causes. While Livy claims Drusus died "from a broken bone when his horse fell on his lower leg, thirty days after this accident", more authors, such as Cassius Dio, Seneca and Suetonius, report illness as the cause of his death. He was also the grandson of Augustus (by adoption of his father) and the nephew of Tiberius and his adopted son. He had borne the name "Germanicus" since he was a boy, after Augustus had posthumously bestowed this hereditary honorary name on his father. According to Augustus' wishes, Germanicus was later to succeed Tiberius as emperor.

=== Mutiny of the legions, 14 AD ===
Immediately after the death of Augustus, the legions of Germania rebelled over the conditions of their military service after twenty years of military campaigns. The legionaries demanded a reduction in conscription to 16 years and an increase in pay to 1 denarius per day. That year there were two armies on the left bank of the Rhine: that of Upper Germany under the command of lieutenant Gaius Silius, and that of Lower Germany entrusted to Aulus Caecina Severus, together with the armies of Lucius Apronius, under the high command of Germanicus, busy carrying out a census in Gaul, to evaluate the patrimonial consistency of that region.

The revolt began in the "lower" army where there were 4 legions: the Legio XXI Rapax, the V Alaudae, the I Germanica and the XX Valeria Victrix. Germanicus, as soon as he heard of the revolt, reached the troops and managed to calm their anger, granting:

- Discharge for soldiers who had 20 years of military service;
- For those who had 16 years of service, automatic passage into the reserve with no other obligation than that of repelling the enemy;
- The bequest they claimed, paid immediately and even doubled.

Caecina was thus able to return to the city of the Ubii, Ara Ubiorum (present-day Cologne), with the I and XX legions, while Germanicus, having gone to the superior army, received the oath of loyalty also from the other 4 legions: the Legio II Augusta, the XIII Gemina, the XVI Gallica and the XIV Gemina.

The soldiers, seized by remorse and fear, since an embassy from the Senate had arrived at Ara Ubiorum, feared that every concession made by Germanicus had been annulled because of their behavior. They therefore began to punish the instigators of the revolt, and this also happened in the legionary fortress of Castra Vetera, around 60 miles to the north, where the V and XXI legions were wintering.

== Forces in the field ==
=== Roman forces ===
Tiberius managed to field an army of eight legions during these campaigns. These were the legions:

- For the "lower" front: the Legio XXI Rapax, the V Alaudae, the I Germanica and the XX Valeria Victrix;
- For the "upper" front: Legio II Augusta, XIII Gemina, XVI Gallica and the XIV Gemina.

In addition to these forces, numerous allied Gallic and Germanic auxiliary troops fought on the Roman side.

=== Germanic tribes involved ===
The Roman attacks were primarily directed against the tribes that had taken part in the Battle of Teutoburg Forest. However, the coalition grew beyond this circle in the course of the campaigns. According to Tacitus, in 17 AD Germanicus finally "held his triumph over the Cherusci, the Chatti and Angrivarii as well as the other tribes that inhabit (the land) as far as the Elbe". According to Strabo, prisoners from subjugated tribes were taken along in the triumphal procession, "namely from the Kaulki, the Ampsivarii, Bructerii, Usipetii, Cherusci, Chatti, Chattuarii, Landii and Tubattii". The Marsii tribe also certainly belonged to Arminius' coalition, even if they are not listed; their equation with the Landii is disputed. Unnamed client tribes of the alliance partners may also have taken up arms, according to Strabo. The small tribe of the Fosi, for example, could be considered as the Cheruscan clientele. In addition, individual followers under their own leaders would have joined Arminius.

The tribes in the extreme northwest of Germania (Frisians, Batavians and others) provided auxiliary troops to the Romans, and their participation in the Arminius coalition can be ruled out. The same applies to the Chauci, even if they may have sympathized with Arminius, as was indicated during the Battle of Idistaviso. The Elbe Germanic tribes and the Marcomanni under Maroboduus stayed away from the coalition.

== Roman War Aims and Strategies ==
=== War aims of Augustus and Germanicus ===
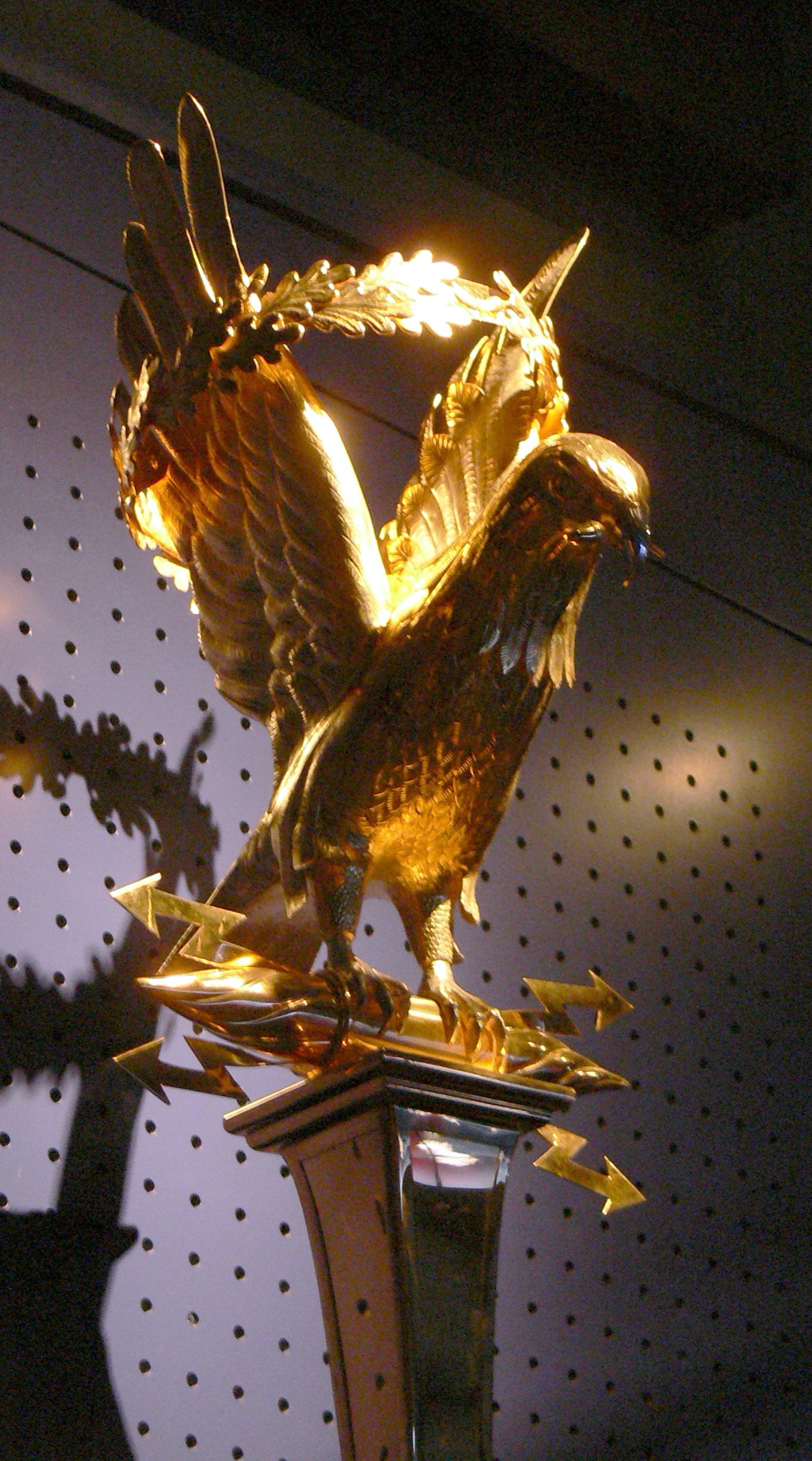
A replica of the Legionary Eagle (Aquila).

The primary war aim of Germanicus, commissioned by Augustus, was to restore the situation before the Teutoburg Forest catastrophe of 9 AD. This included the re-establishment of Roman supremacy west of the Rhine and the subjugation of the rebellious tribes, the protection of Gaul from Germanic raids, retaliation for the destruction of Varus' legions, also according to the Tabula Siarensis, and the recovery of the three legionary eagles lost in the Battle of the Teutoburg Forest. (Note: Germanicus was actually able to secure two of the eagles. (See: Johne 2006, p. 195; Wolters 2009, p. 212; Tabula Siarensis, fragment I Z. 12–15).) In addition, the loyalty of the coastal tribes had to be secured: Frisians and Chauci had stayed away from Arminius' revolt, but control over these (and possibly over other smaller coastal tribes) had to be at least maintained, perhaps partially regained.

It is uncertain whether reaching the Elbe was a serious military goal of Germanicus. (Note: See also: Germaniam pacare. Zur neueren Diskussion über die Strategie des Augustus gegenüber Germanien. In: Chiron. Vol. 30, 2000, pp. 751–757.) The young general actually sworn to this goal. He also received his triumphal procession, among other things, because he had defeated the tribes between the Rhine and the Elbe. But reaching the Elbe was not militarily justified. It is unclear how an advance to the Elbe could have ended the war in the Romans' favor. On the contrary, a confrontation with the Elbe Germanic tribes would have expanded the conflict considerably and probably also drawn the powerful Marcomannic Empire of Maroboduus into conflict. The historian Dieter Timpe states that Tacitus describes the role of the Elbe "almost ironically"; the river appears as the "unrealistic geographical symbol of the filial ambition of a general". The Tabula Siarensis no longer mentions the Elbe.

The main means of achieving the objectives was the destruction of the tribes' livelihoods, (the settlement areas, the fields and, if possible, the livestock). In doing so, Germanicus followed the tactic that Caesar had already used against evasive tribes: the destruction of the economic basis was intended to wear down the tribe and undermine the authority of the tribal leaders hostile to Rome. In order to secure the area in front of the Rhine border, the Romans undertook devastating campaigns against the tribes near the Rhine and pushed them back into the interior of Germania. Rapid and surprising advances as well as ruthless harshness even towards their own troops were essential features of Germanicus' operations. Political measures and military operations also aimed to drive wedges into the tribal coalitions and the tribes themselves. Finally, the fleet and the use of waterways also played an important role.

=== Goals of Tiberius ===
The comprehensive war aims of Augustus and Germanicus were contrasted with the more limited aims of Tiberius. The experienced general and expert on Germania relied on controlling the tribal world through diplomacy, money and the exploitation of the notorious aristocratic and tribal conflicts. But first Tiberius had to let Germanicus have his way, who could invoke the mandate of the deceased emperor. In the words of historian Boris Dreyer: "Anyone who wanted to make a correction here had no easy task ahead of him, even after the death of the deified Augustus". It took two years for Tiberius to prevail. (Note: See also: Wolters, Reinhard (1989). "Tam diu Germania vincitur" Römische Germanensiege und germanische Siegespropaganda bis zum Ende des 1. Jahrhunderts n. Chr. Bochum. p. 40.)

== Timeline, 14 AD ==
=== Crossing of the Rhine and Invasion of Germania ===
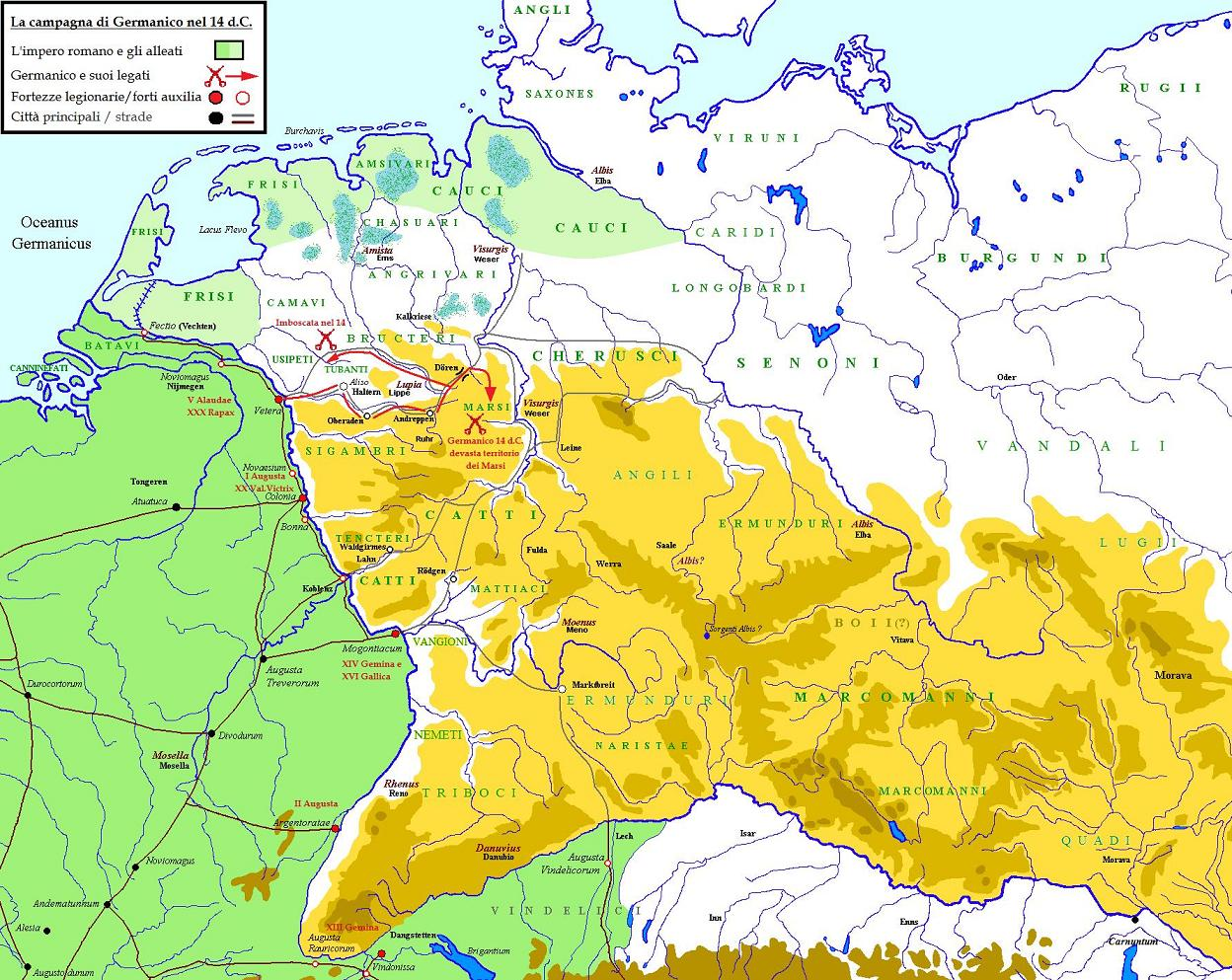
Germanicus' military campaign in 14 AD.

Immediately after the end of the mutiny and at an unusually late time of year, Germanicus ordered a campaign against the Marsi, who lived between the Caesia silva (Heissiwald, near Essen) and the Lippe and Ruhr rivers, beyond of which started the lands of the Marsi tribe. The sources have different views on the reasons and goals of the military operation: According to Cassius Dio, Germanicus feared new unrest in the army and crossed the Rhine to keep the troops busy and supply them with booty. Tacitus, on the other hand, reports that the soldiers themselves had pushed for the campaign in order to rehabilitate themselves. The reason for Tacitus's psychological view may have been his desire to uncover the "background of human decisions". Research generally gives preference to Dio's interpretation.

=== Campaign against the Marsi ===
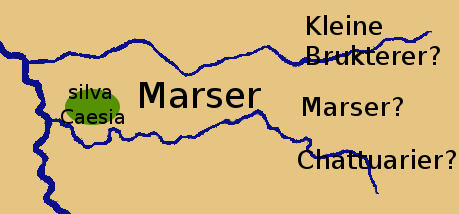
The Caesia Silva, Heissiwald, between the Lippe and Ruhr rivers.

Germanicus, to calm the spirits of the legions, dreaming of following in the footsteps of his father Drusus, despite not having received any authorization from Tiberius, decided to build a bridge of ships over the Rhine and cross the river with vexillationes of 4 legions (equal to 12,000 men-at-arms), 26 cohorts of auxiliary infantry and 8 cavalry units (alae), and invaded Germania. In total, the force probably comprised around 30,000 men. The Romans had received news of upcoming cult celebrations among the Marsi and approached unnoticed via remote paths. They managed to surround the revelers, surprising them in the attack. Four attack wedges caused a massacre, and children, women and old people were not spared either, as Tacitus reports. The legions destroyed the Tamfana sanctuary, which was of national importance. Dio reports rich booty for the soldiers, while Tacitus reports that during the ensuing massacre not a single Roman soldier was even wounded (the Romans suffered no casualties).

Outraged by the massacre, the tribes of the Bructeri, Tubatii and Usipitii set up an ambush in the wooded gorges on the Romans' return journey, possibly in Heissiwald (modern-day Essen) in the middle of the Ruhr valley, but Roman reconnaissance worked well again and the Germans were unable to repeat the victory at Teutoburg Forest. Germanicus decided to force a mountain pass, moving forward half of the cavalry and auxiliary cohorts, followed by the Legio I Germanica, and behind it the baggage train, which was covered on the right by the Legio V Alaudae and on the left by the Legio XXI Rapax. The baggage train was guarded from the rear by the Legio XX Valeria Victrix, and the second half of the auxilia was in the rearguard. Having waited for the Romans to be drawn into the gorges, the Germans engaged the head of the column and the flanks in battle, and with their main forces attacked the rearguard. The auxiliary columns could not withstand the onslaught, and then Germanicus, galloping up to the ranks of the XX Valeria Victrix, shouted that it was time to atone for the shame of the mutiny with military valor. The legionaries rushed to the attack, broke through the enemy lines, drove the Germans along the gorge and, having come out into the open, routed them utterly. The tribes that had set up an ambush themselves found themselves in a trap when the heavy Roman infantry attacked their lightly armed warriors in the mountain pass. Meanwhile, the advance units emerged from the gorge and re-fortified the camp locatedin front of it, (Note: It is not clear from Tacitus' account what exactly is being referred to, but it was probably the camp from which Germanicus set out against the Marsi, and which was intended in advance as a refuge on the return journey (See: Savin 2020, p. 204).) which the Germans probably managed to partially destroy.

=== Retreat back into Roman territory ===
Having completed the campaign, the troops returned to the left bank of the Rhine under the orders of Germanicus. The campaign "ended with a clear success, in which Germanicus played no small part". The autumn expedition was undertaken without the sanction of Rome, but Tiberius, understanding its importance for restoring discipline in the troops, not without some displeasure nevertheless approved the actions of Germanicus.

== Timeline, 15 AD ==
=== Organization of the army ===
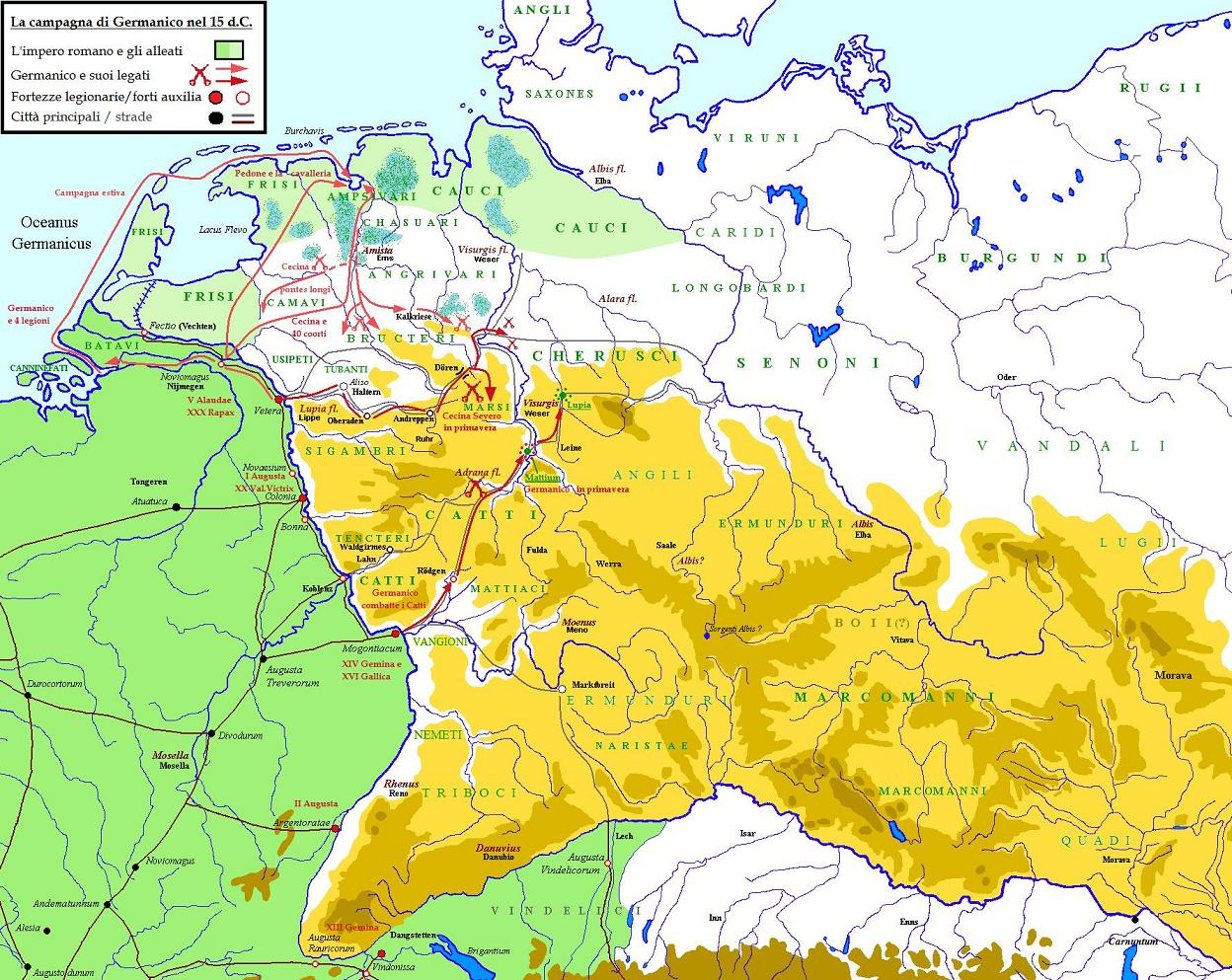
Germanicus' military campaign in 15 AD.

At the end of Germanicus' first campaign in the Marsi, Tiberius decided to award him a triumph while the war was still being fought. He had carefully prepared the new campaign of 15 AD, anticipating the operations to spring and attacking the Chatti tribe first. Germanicus hoped that before crossing the Rhine he had succeeded in dividing the enemy into two parties:

- A pro-Roman part, led by Arminius' father-in-law, a certain Segestes;
- Another part, hostile to Rome, led by Arminius himself, who praised a free Germania from the Roman oppressor.

He divided the army into two columns:

- The first entrusted to Aulus Caecina Severus, moved from the legionary fortress of Castra Vetera (modern-day Xanten), in command of vexillationes of 4 legions of Lower Germany (equal to approximately 12–15,000 legionnaires), including 5,000 auxiliaries and some troops of German allies, living on the left bank of the Rhine;
- The second led by Germanicus himself, moved from Mogontiacum (modern-day Mainz), in command of vexillationes of the 4 legions of Upper Germany (equal to approximately 12–15,000 legionaries) and double the number of German allies, living on the left bank of the Rhine.

=== Segestes' question ===
The mutiny of the legions offered Arminius an opportunity to "settle accounts with the internal enemy". In 9 AD, the pro-Roman prince of the Cherusci Segestes had warned the Roman governor Varus of Arminius's attack plans, but in vain. The enmity between the princely families took on an additional personal note when Arminius, against Segestes' wishes, married his daughter Thusnelda, although she was promised to someone else: the "son-in-law was hated, the parents-in-law were enemies", as Tacitus summarizes. In the autumn/winter of 14 AD, Arminius evidently wanted to force a decision. He took action against Segestes, but Segestes initially seemed to have gained the upper hand.

The internal Cherusci power struggle did not go unnoticed by Germanicus. He hoped that the Arminius coalition would collapse and that the tribal leadership would be taken over by forces friendly to Rome. He therefore changed his campaign plans, which had only planned a major campaign for the summer of 15 AD, and attacked in the spring. The target was the Chatti, whose princely houses were related to those of the Cherusci. A direct Roman intervention in Cherusci territory would probably have turned the tribe against Segestes' party.

Germanicus was going to resume military operations in the summer, but news of Arminius's conflict with the ruler of the Chatti, Segestes, forced him to act early in the spring. Segestes had been an ally of the Romans before the general uprising, the Germans did not trust him, and Arminius had kidnapped his daughter Thusnelda, promised to another, and married her, which only increased the enmity.

=== Campaign against the Chatti ===
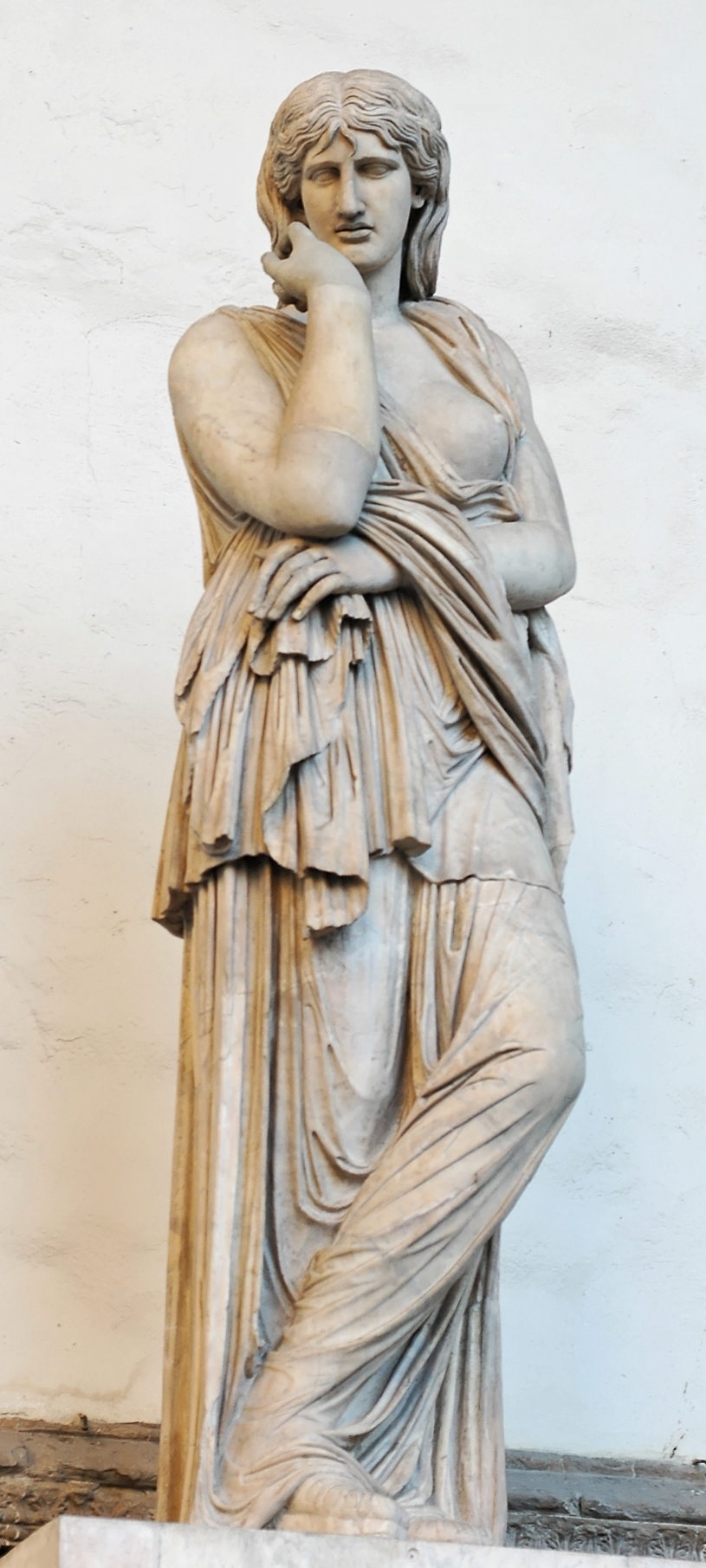
The Mourning Barbarian (Rome, c. 2nd century AD), interpreted as a depiction of Thusnelda, daughter of Segestes and Arminius' wife.

In the spring of 15 AD, Germanicus and the Upper Rhine army, including 10,000 auxiliaries, invaded the Chatti from modern-day Mainz, heading towards Mogontiacum, while another army was sent from the Lower Rhine army, including 4,000 auxiliaries, under the command of Caecina. The march probably led through the Wetterau into what is now northern Hesse. The Roman camp at Friedberg may have been on the route. As in the previous autumn, the Romans were able to use the element of surprise. The unusually dry weather allowed the rapid advance of light troops without special fortification of roads and river crossings. Germanic tribes who could not flee were captured or massacred. On the Eder, a Chatti contingent tried in vain to prevent the Romans from crossing. Part of the tribe then surrendered, another part scattered into the forests. The Romans destroyed the main town of Mattium (not clearly localized) and devastated the settlement areas.

Having built a fortification on the ruins of the defensive structures erected by his father in the Daunian Mountains, Germanicus also left a detachment of Lucius Apronius there to lay out roads and crossings from Mogontiacum, since he feared that on the way back the rivers would overflow their banks due to the rains, and he moved by forced march against the Chatti, some of whom sided with Arminius against Segestes.

The Cherusci planned to rush to the aid of the Chatti. However, this was prevented by the legate Aulus Caecina Severus, who was operating with the Lower Rhine army further north in the Lippe-Ems region. The Marsi dared to attack Caecina, but were defeated "in a successful battle".

On the return march, Germanicus received unfavorable news: Segestes had been defeated in the power struggle with Arminius and was besieged in his fortified manor house. However, he had previously managed to take the pregnant Thusnelda captive. According to historian Hans Delbrück, Segestus' fortress was located on Mount Grotenburg in the southwest of the Teutoburg Forest, 3 miles from the Roman camp at Aliso, which was restored during this campaign. Germanicus, who was apparently still deep into Germania, (Note: Otherwise, Caecina, operating in the Southern regions, would have had the shorter route to Segestes (See: Becker 1992, p. 200).) turned around and rushed to the aid of the besieged. The legions drove out the besiegers and escorted Segestes with his followers and prisoners to the Rhine. Later in the year, Segimer, the brother of Segestes, would also go into Roman exile in a similar manner. Thusnelda gave birth to a son in captivity who was given the name Thumelicus. He was raised in Ravenna and later "fell victim to ridicule", as Tacitus reports; details of this are contained in a book of annals that has been lost.

=== Campaign against the Bructerii ===
Meanwhile, Arminius had succeeded in increasing his military force. He was able to win over the prince of the Cherusci Inguiomer, his uncld and previously a friend of the Romans, to his side, and also mobilize neighboring tribes against Rome. Germanicus was concerned about these developments and again changed his plans for the summer campaign: "So that the war does not break out with all its force", the general now strove to "tear the enemy (forces) apart". He formed three army columns: Caecina led 40 cohorts (Note: Probably not auxiliaries, but legionary cohorts (See Becker 1992, p. 188).) with around 20,000 men from Xanten into the Bructeri territory between the Rhine and the Ems. The prefect Albinovanus Pedo departed from Nijmegen and crossed the Frisian territory with 8 alae of cavalry in the central and northern Netherlands with the cavalry. Germanicus had around 30,000 men of the four Upper Rhine legions shipped by ship across Lake Flevo (in Latin: Lacus Flevo, modern-day IJsselmeer) and the North Sea into the Ems. The naval maneuver not only brought supplies to the area of operations by river transport, but also secured the loyalty of the coastal peoples. A troop contingent of the Chauci tribe was integrated into the army, which was tantamount to being held hostage. An impressive force finally assembled at a meeting point on the Ems, perhaps near Rheine, forming an army of at least 60,000 total men.

The legions marched up the Ems through the territory of the Bructerii, who, however, avoided a fight and left scorched earth in the wake of the advancing Romans. A quick unit under Lucius Stertinius managed to secure the eagle of the Legio XIX, which had been lost in the Battle of the Teutoburg Forest. Finally, the army was "led into the most remote parts of the Bructeri country and all the territory between the Ems and the Lippe was devastated, not far from the Teutoburg Forest, where, it was said, the remains of Varus and his legions still lay unburied".

=== Burial of Varus' army ===
Germanicus decided to pay his last respects to the remains of the fallen. He may also have intended to conduct a more detailed investigation into the Varus catastrophe. An advance guard under Caecina explored the "hidden forest ravines" and built causeways and bridges for the advancing army. The soldiers first discovered traces of the first legionary camp, large enough for three legions. Finally, they reached the half-destroyed ramparts and the shallow ditches in whose protection the decimated remnants of Varus' army had taken refuge. Tacitus vividly describes the impressions that arose:

«In the middle of the field (one could see) bleaching bones, scattered or in heaps, depending on whether the soldiers had fled or resisted. Next to them lay broken weapons and horse skeletons, and at the same time one could see human skulls nailed to the front of the tree stumps. In the neighboring groves stood the altars of the barbarians, on which they had slaughtered the tribunes and centurions of the first rank. And survivors of this defeat, of the battle or of captivity, told how the legates had fallen here, the eagles had been stolen there; they showed where Varus had received his first wound, where he had found death with his own blow from his unfortunate right hand; on which hill Arminius had spoken to the army, how many gallows there were for the prisoners, what kind of torture pits there were, and how he had mocked the standards and eagles with great arrogance.»

— Tacitus, I, 61, 2–4; translated by Erich Heller, Munich 1991 [1982], p. 67.

The soldiers buried the bones of their comrades. According to Tacitus, Germanicus laid the first patch of turf on the burial mound. According to Suetonius's tradition, he was the first to collect mortal remains for burial with his own hands. Tiberius disapproved of the burial because of the demoralizing effect it had on the legions; moreover, Germanicus held the office of an augur and should not have come into contact with corpses for religious reasons.

=== The Kalkriese site according to Tacitus ===
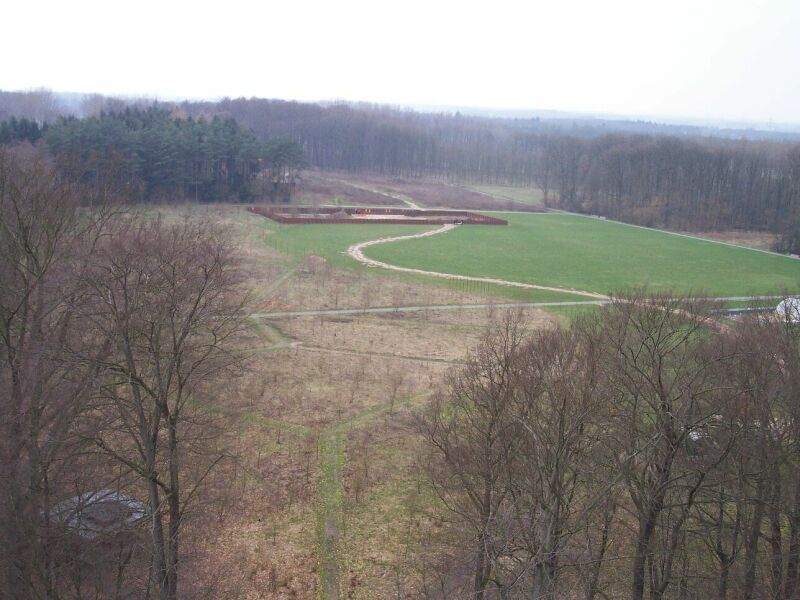
Presumed site of the Battle of the Teutoburg Forest at Kalkriese.

The burial described supports the location of the Teutoburg Forests at the Kalkriese site. Bone pits were discovered there containing the remains of at least 17 adults aged between 20 and 47 years. Some of the bone fragments show significant signs of injury. With the exception of a pelvic bone fragment, the remains were attributed exclusively to male individuals. The skeletal parts were found without any anatomical connection and mixed with animal bones. They were only collected and buried after the soft tissue had perished. The findings can be "linked to a battle".

In the summer of 2016, the remains of another rampart were discovered in Kalkriese. This, together with the long-known rampart at Oberesch, could belong to the last Varus camp mentioned by Tacitus. Excavations in 2017 are expected to provide further information. As early as 2011, the possibility was considered that the rampart at Oberesch could not have been part of a Germanic ambush, but of a Roman camp.

=== Battle of the Weser, summer of 15 AD ===
Arminius had meanwhile retreated into impassable terrain, where Germanicus followed. The Germanic tribes lined up for battle on a plain. The Roman cavalry attacked from the march, the warriors pretended to flee. A surprise Germanic flank attack threw the cavalry into disarray and almost pushed the reserve cohorts that had rushed to the scene into a swamp. Only the approaching legions were able to stabilize the situation. They "separated without a decision", as Tacitus admitted. Germanicus may have underestimated his opponent because he attributed the catastrophe of 9 AD primarily to a failure on the part of Varus and did not reckon with the military capabilities of a Germanic force led by Arminius. Nevertheless, the battle was once again a Roman victory, but the governor did not risk pursuing the enemy in an unfamiliar country and returned to the ships.

=== Battle at the Pontes Longi, 15 AD ===
September came, the military season was drawing to a close and the Romans began to retreat to the Rhine and returning tonsinter quarters due to Germanicus' orders. He himself marched with his Upper Rhine army to the Ems to board the ships. The horsemen were to follow along the coast. Caecina's four Lower Rhine legions took the land route that led them over the pontes longi (long bridges). These Germanic plank roads, located either in the North German lowlands or between the Rhine and the Ems, led through extensive marshlands and had been built almost two decades earlier by Lucius Domitius Ahenobarbus. Caecina's troops may have been repairing the roads in preparation for the next year of campaigns.

The fleet came out into shallow water, apparently at the entrance to Lake Flevo, and to prevent the ships from running aground, Germanicus ordered the Legio II Augusta and the XIV Gemina under the command of the legate Publius Vitellius to be sent along the shore by land. Soon after the landing of the Romans (according to Tacitus, this happened on the day of the autumn equinox) a north wind drove up a strong wave and the troops almost perished in the flood. By nightfall, Vitellius managed to lead the men to dry ground, and the next day the legionaries reached the channel where Germanicus' ships were waiting for them. On the bank of the channel, the governor built the camp of Flevum, which became the northernmost fortification on the Rhine border and an outpost in the lands of the Frisians.

The danger of a Germanic attack on Caecina's army was evidently well known to those in charge: Germanicus ordered the legate to cross the pontes longi "as quickly as possible, although he was returning by known routes". Nevertheless, Arminius managed to overtake the legions by shorter routes, breaking through only after a fierce battle in swampy terrain. After two days of costly fighting and the abandonment of the baggage train, the legions were able to set up camp on solid ground on the evening of the second day. In this situation, Arminius advised waiting; he wanted to let the Romans move out the next day and attack again as they continued their march. However, at the instigation of Inguiomerus, the Germanic tribes stormed the camp. A surprise sortie by the Romans repelled the attackers. The victory was so complete that the legions were no longer in danger as they continued their march.

Retreating beyond the Rhine, Germanicus paid his depleted troops a reward from his own funds. The Roman losses in the campaign of 15 AD were significant and the troops had to be brought back into order at the expense of the resources of Italy, Gaul and Spain, and probably a new military recruitment had to be carried out.

The results of the campaign were not very satisfactory, but Tiberius awarded triumphal distinctions to Aulus Caecina Severus, Lucius Apronius and the legate of Upper Germania, Gaius Silius Caecina Largus. It was probably then that the Legio I received the nickname Germanica. In anticipation of decisive action the following year, Tiberius sent two praetorian cohorts to the Rhine under the command of his personal friend Seius Tubero with the task of keeping an eye on the governor and, in the event of major successes, preventing his proclamation as emperor.

=== Losses due to a storm surge ===
Meanwhile, parts of the units led by Germanicus had also run into difficulties. Two of the four legions were initially unable to board the ships because the vehicles would have run aground if fully loaded. Therefore, the legate Publius Vitellius was to lead the Legio II Augusta and the XIV Gemina along the coast. A heavy storm surge (Note: A spring tide is not to be considered, as some researchers have incorrectly stated (See: Kehne, Peter (1998). Germanicus. In: Reallexikon der Germanischen Altertumskunde (RGA). 2 (in German). Vol. 11. p. 443.) Spring tides occur during a full or new moon. At the time in question, however, the moon was waning. (See: Connaissance des phénomènes, phases de la lune (in French). L'institut de mécanique céleste et de calcul des éphémérides.)) at the equinox (23 September of 15 AD) flooded the coastal areas and swept away many of the marchers. The survivors struggled to save themselves on higher ground. Allegedly on the Weser (some researchers suspect an error in the accounts here) the survivors re-established contact with the fleet and embarked.

=== Conflict with Tiberius ===
The outcome of the campaign year was sobering. The Romans had retained control over the North Sea tribes, brought home a Varus eagle and carried out acts of revenge for the Varus defeat. But the hoped-for split of the Cherusci had failed to materialise and the Germanic resistance was unbroken. Moreover, the tribes had succeeded in inflicting considerable losses on the Romans. Germanicus had gained an opponent in Arminius, who had retained the upper hand in 15 AD due to his extraordinary abilities.

Tiberus disapproved of his general's conduct of the war. Germanicus' actions seemed too haphazard and risky. By autumn at the latest, perhaps as early as summer, the emperor pressed for an end to the war. The granting of a triumph (Note: The decision for the triumph may have been made as early as the spring of 15 AD. Tacitus mentions the approval of the triumph right at the beginning of the description of the campaign (See: Tacitus, I, 55, 1; Koestermann 1957, p. 430; Kehne 1998, p. 443).) was the unmistakable signal to Germanicus to stop the war. But the young general ignored the demands from Rome and prepared for a major blow against the Arminius coalition the following year.

== Timeline, 16 AD ==
=== Fleet strategy of invasion ===
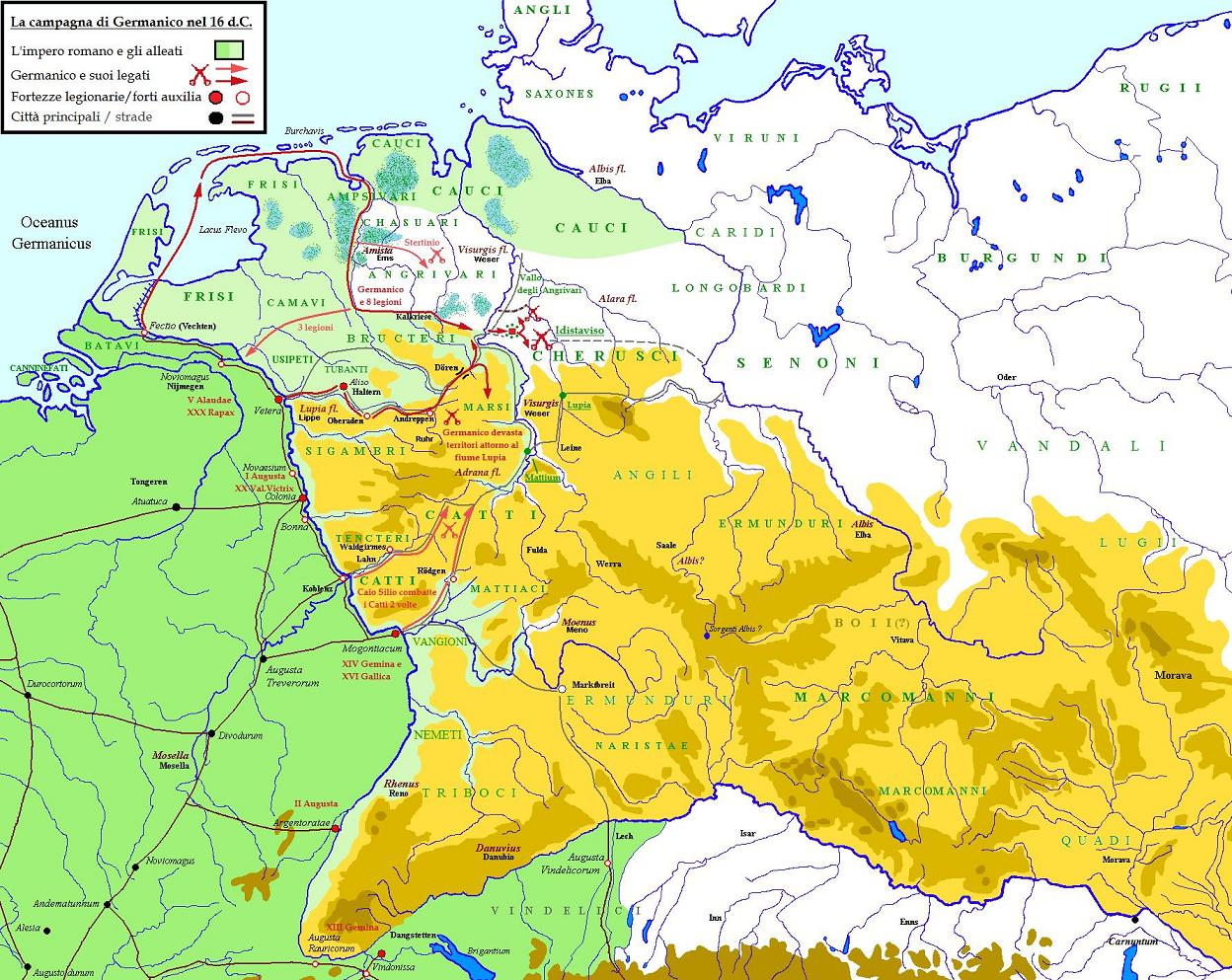
Germanicus' military campaign in 16 AD.

In 16 AD, the aim was no longer to divide the enemy, but to destroy them. A "bloody and merciless offensive war", characterized by ruthless harshness toward the enemy and one's own troops reached its climax in 16 AD. The main opponents were the Cherusci, who were to be attacked in their core areas on the upper Weser and in the Leine valley.

Tacitus has Germanicus make detailed strategic and tactical considerations: Forests and swamps, as well as the short summer, which limited the Romans' operational time, were advantageous for the Germanic tribes; field battles in open terrain were disadvantageous. For the Romans, on the other hand, the long marches, the consumption of weapons, the long baggage columns and the fact that the Gallic horse resources were now almost exhausted were problematic. The sea route offered a solution: legions and provisions could be transported together and campaigns could begin earlier in the year. The horses were spared by sea and river transport. There was also the element of surprise, because the legions could suddenly advance deep into the interior of Germania via the North German rivers. Tacitus gives another argument elsewhere: the Germanic tribes had the habit of attacking the Romans on their return marches because the road problems increased as the season progressed due to the weather, supplies were largely exhausted and the legions could no longer operate flexibly. (Note: Tacitus, II, 15, 2 (See also: Tacitus, I, 51, 2; Tacitus, I, 63, 3–4; Cassius Dio, 54, 33, 3–4 and Cassius Dio, 56, 18).) A fleet improved logistical possibilities and shortened the retreat.

To implement this strategy, Germanicus ordered the equipment of a fleet of 1,000 ships, which Tacitus described in detail: Some (aliae) of the transports were short, with a broad hull but narrow bow and stern to withstand the waves more easily; some (quaedam) had a flat keel to enable them to run aground; several (plures) were equipped with rudders fore and aft to enable the vessel to be moved sideways; many (multae) had decks on which to carry horses, provisions and guns or under their protection. (Note: Rudders at the front are also a clear indication of a river trip, because when traveling downstream with the current the rudder effect of the stern rudder is dangerously limited. The front helmsman has to move the boat sideways away from obstacles. (See: Ellmers, Detlev. Techniken und Organisationsformen der Nutzung von Binnenwasserstraßen im Hoch- und Spätmittelalter (in German). In: Schwinges, Rainer Christoph (ed.): Road and traffic systems in the high and late Middle Ages. Ostfildern 2007, p. 164).)

=== Military operations in spring, 16 AD ===
While the ships were being prepared until spring, Germanicus ordered military operations against tribes near the Rhine. The legate Gaius Silius marched from Mainz with fast troops against the Chatti, but only managed to capture the wife and daughter of the Chatti prince Arpus.

Meanwhile, Germanicus marched up the Lippe with six legions (Lower Germanic legions and probably the II Augusta and the XIII Gemina) to relieve a fort that was besieged by the Germanic tribes. The camp could have been Aliso; in this case it would have been rebuilt after the Varus' catastrophe and occupied over the winter. The Germanic tribes retreated before the superior force, but destroyed the burial mound that had been built the previous year for the fallen in the Varus Battle, as well as an altar to Drusus. Germanicus had the altar restored, and roads and causeways between the Rhine and Aliso re-fortified. He then gathered the legions at the Batavian island (modern-day [[Nederrj ijn]]) between the Lower Rhine and the Waal to board the ships that were now waiting there. Probably at the same time, Castra Herculis (modern-day Arnhem) was built on the right bank of the Rhine to defend this island from the north, located 17.5 km north of Batavodurum. 3.5 km downstream, the Romans set up a large camp, now known as Dril, and in Flevum they equipped berths for ships of various classes.

=== Fleet landing on the Ems ===
As in the previous year, but now with all 8 legions and the cavalry, the unit sailed through the Canal of Drusus and Lake Flevo across the North Sea into the Ems. The fleet is believed to have transported around 70,000 men, as well as around 10,000 riding horses and just as many pack animals. The ships landed near the mouth of the river, still within the tides, a contradiction to the strategic concept that emphasized the advantages of a river journey. The landing took place on the western bank of the Ems. Roman finds were discovered near Bentumersiel that can be dated to the military operations of Germanicus. Evidence of a camp or fleet landing site has not yet been found.

Tacitus describes the landing as well as the difficulties and delays in the subsequent crossing of the Ems. This 8th chapter in the second book of the Annals is one of the most enigmatic and controversial of Tacitus's account of Germanicus, and final clarity has not yet been achieved. The army's subsequent route also remains uncertain. The route probably led through the areas of the Chauci and Angrivarii and finally up the Weser. A revolt by Angrivarian tribes behind the Romans was quickly suppressed by cavalry and lightly armed troops under Stertinius.

=== Initial military campaigns ===
The Romans probably built a base on the western bank of the Weser at the Porta Westfalica. The Germanic troops had gathered east of the river. Across the river, an argument developed between Arminius and his brother Flavus ("The Blonde"), who was in Roman service. Flavus emphasized the greatness of Rome, warned of the punishments for the defeated and stressed the leniency for the conquered; Arminius' wife and son were also treated well. Arminius reminded his brother of the "sacred obligation to the fatherland" (fas patriae), the "inherited freedom" (libertatem avitam) and the local gods. An argument broke out, and Arminius announced a battle against the Romans. Delbrück considers this whole story to be a fiction, borrowed by Tacitus from some epic poet, although it indirectly testifies to the fact that the campaign could have been accompanied by negotiations with the free Germans.

The next day, Roman cavalry units crossed the river at fords to secure the army's bridge. The Batavian auxiliary troops under their leader Chariovalda were ambushed and almost wiped out. Chariovalda fell before other Roman units under the legate Stertinius and the primus pilus Aemilius could rush to the aid of the beleaguered.

The Romans crossed the Weser and learned from a defector the battle site chosen by Arminius. They also received news that other tribes had gathered and were planning a night raid on the camp.. This information is considered to be evidence of the massive support of the Cherusci by other Germanic tribes.

The Germanic assembly point was a forest that was dedicated to "Heracles", while it was actually dedicated to Donar. From Tacitus' description it is not clear how long the Romans had been staying east of the Weser at this point. It is also unknown which camp, a marching camp or the base at Porta Westfalica, to which the Romans might have returned, was the target of the raid. The Germanic tribes realized that the Romans were warned and prepared and refrained from the attack. Germanic attempts to persuade the soldiers to desert with the promise of land, money (100 sesterces daily) and women were also unsuccessful.

=== Battle of Idistaviso, 16 AD ===
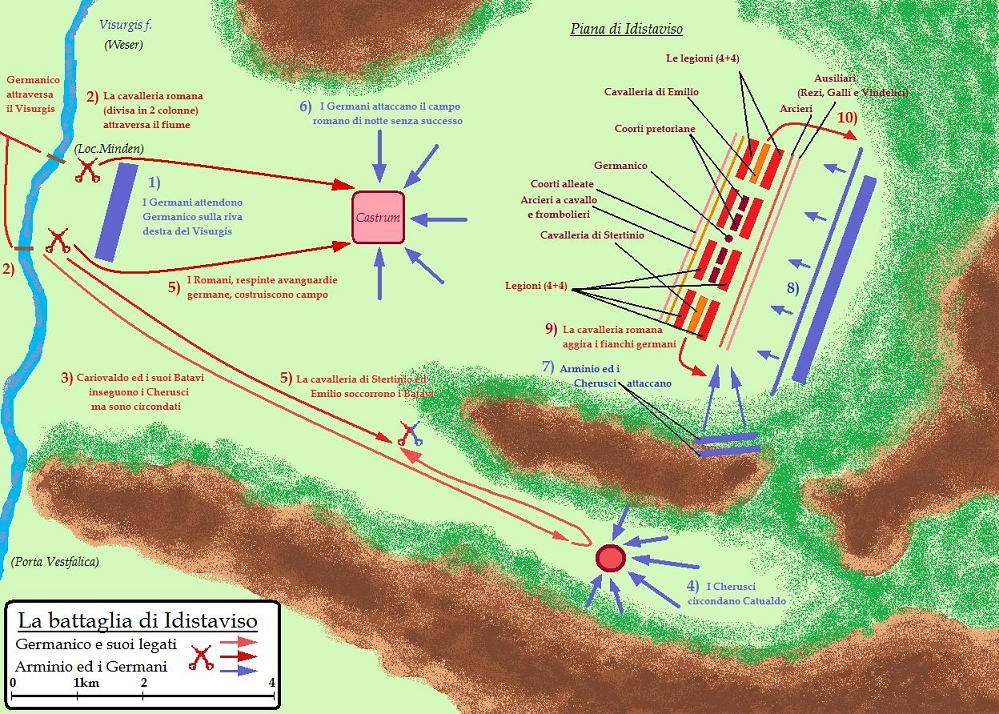
The plain of Idistaviso and the battle that took place between the legions of Germanicus and the hordes of the Germans of Arminius in 16 AD.

The next morning, Germanicus turned to his soldiers and prepared them for a decisive battle in the forests. Not only the plains were favourable for legionaries, Tacitus had the general explain, but also mountains and forests. The Germanic tribes had difficulty handling their large shields and lances in the undergrowth; their unprotected bodies, especially their faces, offered good targets for the compact weapons of the well-equipped Romans. The battle brought the soldiers an end to their strenuous marches and sea voyages: "The Elbe was already closer than the Rhine, and there was no war on the other side". Finally, he led the army onto the battlefield, a plain called Idistaviso. The term may stand for "Idisstättenwiese", although it remains unclear who or what Idis- refers to. Historian and philologist Norbert Wagner interprets the name as a term for a productive, vigorously renewing meadow. The conflict is considered the largest battle of the Augustan Germanic Wars. The exact location is unknown, but it is generally assumed to have taken place between Minden and Rinteln.

Having crossed the river, Germanicus learned from scouts what place Arminius had chosen for the battle, and also received information that the leaders of several tribes, having gathered in a grove dedicated to Heracles, had decided to attack the Roman camp at night. This undertaking failed, since, approaching the Romans around the third watch, the Germans found cohorts ready for battle on the walls.

The plain stretched irregularly between the Weser and hills and was bordered "in the back" by a sparse forest, reports Tacitus, while mentioning that "it has an uneven outline and varies in width, depending on whether the banks of the river recede or whether the projections of the mountains prevent this". The Cherusci had occupied the hills, probably to attack the Romans from the flank. The other tribes had taken up positions on the plain and at the edge of the forest. The Cherusci advance came too early and Germanicus sent the cavalry against the warriors. Stertinius was given the order to lead his units into the rear of the Cherusci. A long drawn-out battle of evasion and pursuit developed, the course of which cannot be reconstructed with certainty from Tacitus' description. Tacitus reports a counter-flight movement of the Germanic tribes: warriors who had occupied the plain fled into the forest due probably to impatience, while others were forced out of the forest into the plain. Meanwhile, the Cherusci had to withdraw from the hills, which they had apparently reoccupied, and, under the leadership of Arminius, threw themselves at the Roman archers in the plain, who were, however, helped by Rhaetian and Gallic auxiliaries. At this point at the latest, the battle was probably decided in favor of the Romans. The Romans pursued the enemy at a distance of 10,000 paces, and the battle itself lasted from ten o'clock in the morning until dark. According to Tacitus, "it was a great victory and cost us almost no blood". The wounded Arminius was able to break through the Roman ranks and get to safety; rumor has it that he was caught by Chaucian auxiliaries, but was let go again.

A large number of (plerusque) Germanic tribesmen who tried to swim across the Weser to safety drowned. Others tried to hide in treetops, but were shot down by archers. According to Tacitus, the bodies of the fallen warriors covered the ground for ten miles (about 15 kilometers). Researchers consider the description of the losses to be greatly exaggerated, among other things because Arminius was able to lead an army against the powerful Marcomannic king Maroboduus the following year.

Germanicus had a tropaion (victory monument made of captured weapons) erected and an inscription listing the defeated tribes (gentes). The army proclaimed Tiberius emperor (imperial acclamation), an honor which he may not have accepted.

=== Battle of the Angrivarian Wall, 16 AD ===
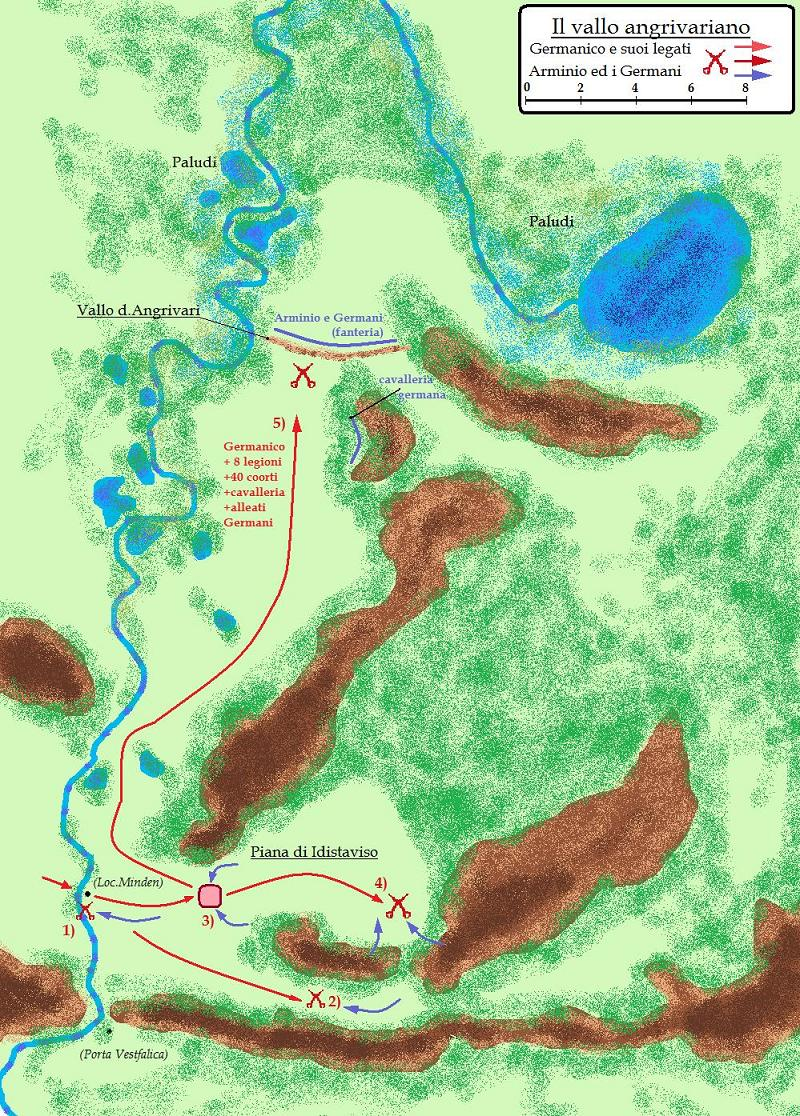
The battle of Idistaviso and the Angrivarii Wall (16 AD) between Germanicus and Arminius.

The developments following the Battle of Idistaviso are only hinted at in Tacitus; the temporal dimensions also remain unclear. At least parts of the Cherusci initially appear to have made preparations to flee across the Elbe. However, Arminius evidently managed to regroup the Germanic troops and mobilize further forces: "People and nobles, young men and old men suddenly stormed against the Roman army and threw it into disarray".

At a long Germanic rampart, known by researchers as the Angrivarian Wall, Arminius again offered the Romans a battle. The Angrivarians had built the bulwark as a border fortification against their southern neighbors, the Cherusci. The location is uncertain; the most likely place is the area between Lake Steinhude and Stolzenau. In 1926, a rampart structure in the village of Leese was archaeologically examined and identified as an Angrivarian Wall.

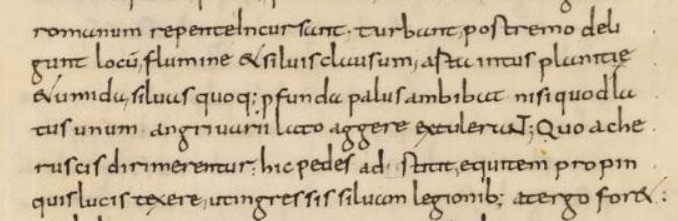
Description of the battlefield at the Angrivarian Wall in Tacitus: Annals. 2, 19, 2 (Codex Mediceus; Source: Biblioteca Medicea Laurenziana).

Tacitus describes the battle, but here too the course of events is not clear. The Germanic infantry had occupied the wall and initially held out against the Roman attack. It was only when the Romans used long-range weapons that the defenders were driven away. The heaviest fighting then seems to have broken out in the adjacent forests, when the Romans suffered heavy losses as well. The Praetorian Guards led the attack on the forests, which also seems to have put the Romans in a threatening position: "The enemy was blocked from the rear by the swamp, the Romans by the river or the mountains; both were forced to hold their ground, hope lay only in bravery, salvation only in victory". Once again, the Romans' armament and weapons proved their worth. Germanicus instructed his soldiers not to take any prisoners, because "only the destruction of the tribe would put an end to the war".

At the end of the day, the Romans had held the field, but as before at Idistaviso, Germanicus had not achieved his actual goal of destroying the enemy. Nevertheless, the soldiers erected a tropaion from captured weapons, with what Tacitus called a "proud" (superbo) inscription: "After defeating the tribes between the Rhine and the Elbe, the army of Emperor Tiberius dedicated this monument to (...) Augustus". The dedication did not correspond to the political and military facts at all.

Afterwards, Stertinius was again sent against the Angrivarii and was able to receive their unconditional surrender without a fight. The tribe then received "full forgiveness".

=== Select Dissenting Modern Opinions on the Battles ===
Delbrück denies the fact of major battles described by Tacitus, believing that we can talk at best about minor skirmishes, the size of which was greatly exaggerated by the panegyrists of Germanicus, and Tacitus, in his opinion, drew information not from historical works, but from some poet. This author does not imagine how the Roman governor would have managed to force a decisive battle on the leader of the Cherusci and writes that from Tacitus's story it is generally impossible to understand on which bank of the river the battles took place and whether the battle on the rampart of the Angrivarii took place during the further advance of the Romans or already on their way back. The authors of the "Cambridge Ancient History" also believe that the Romans carried out a number of targeted operations in Germany, improving their positions, but without achieving significant successes. There are several theories as to why Arminius engaged in the great battle (for example, he may have been forced into it by his allies, or he may have been forced to defend his own Cherusci territory, which had been invaded by the enemy), but the extent of the defeat at Idistaviso is clearly exaggerated by Tacitus, given how quickly the Germans recovered and fielded a new army.

=== Return journey and fleet disaster ===
Germanicus then ended the campaign because it was “now already high summer”, an astonishing justification considering the time and success pressure under which Germanicus was. Some legions returned by land, the majority embarked on the Ems.

On the North Sea, the fleet was caught in a severe storm, which Tacitus vividly describes. Some (pars) of the ships sank, even more (plures) were stranded on uninhabited islands; the shipwrecked had to survive on horse carcasses until they were rescued. Germanicus' galley was able to land near the Chauci. After the weather improved, the patched-up ships returned, some without oars, with makeshift sails and in tow. Legionaries who had been taken prisoner by distant coastal tribes were ransomed by the Angrivarians on behalf of the Romans. Some soldiers had been sent as far as Britain and were sent back by the petty kings.

=== Campaigns in Autumn ===
Returning to the Rhine, Germanicus ordered Gaius Silius to march against the Chatti with a mixed force of 3,000 cavalry and 33,000 infantry and lay waste to their territory, while he himself, with a larger army, invaded the Marsi for the third time and devastated their land. He forced Mallovendus, the defeated leader of the Marsi, to reveal the location of another of the three legion's eagles lost in AD 9. Immediately Germanicus despatched troops to recover it. The Romans advanced into the country, defeating any foe they encountered.

At this point in the Annals, Tacitus revealed how critical he was of the subsequent end of the Germanic Wars by Tiberius: the Germanic tribes had never felt such great fear of the Romans as in the autumn of 16 AD. The legions appeared invincible because, after the losses of the naval campaign, they were still able to make incursions into Germania with determination and great manpower. The soldiers returned to their winter camp in good spirits, "because the successful campaign had compensated them for the misfortune at sea." There was no doubt that the Germanic tribes would have surrendered the following summer.

=== End of the war and dismissal of Germanicus ===
Tiberius did not share Germanicus' optimism, as recorded by Tacitus, and was now determined to end the campaigns. The experienced general and expert on Germania had to fear that the war "constantly contained the danger of a second Varus catastrophe in view of G[ermanicus'] almost obsessive daring". At the end of 16 AD, Tiberius was in the third year of his reign and was now in a position to pass the test of strength with his popular adopted son. In numerous letters, according to Tacitus, the emperor was critical: there had been enough successes (eventuum) and misfortunes (casuum); Tiberius himself, as commander-in-chief in Germania at the time, had achieved more through deliberation (consilio) than through force (vi). The revenge for Varus' army had been taken, and the tribes could now be left to their internal disputes (internis discordiis). Moreover, the command of the Rhine should pass to his biological son Drusus Minor, so that he would have opportunities to gain fame.

Highest honors (which had already been awarded to Germanicus and his legates in 15 AD) and a second consulship were intended to keep up the formalities and make it easier for Germanicus to return. Germanicus finally had to bow to the growing pressure from Tiberius. He left Germania to celebrate the triumph he had already been awarded the previous year in Rome and then to take on a task in the east of the empire. The Germanicus campaigns and with them the era of the Augustan Germanic Wars were over.

== Balance and Consequences ==
=== Roman balance sheet ===
Main Roman Castra in the area of present-day Germany and the Netherlands

Germanicus' successes (Note: See also: Kehne, Peter (1998). Germanicus. In: Reallexikon der Germanischen Altertumskunde (RGA). 2 (in German). Vol. 11. p. 444.; Reinhard Wolters: Revenge, claim and renunciation. Roman Germania policy after the Varus catastrophe. In: LWL-Römermuseum in Haltern am See (ed.): 2000 years of the Varus Battle - Empire. Stuttgart 2009, p. 211.) included at least two major battle victories (Idistaviso and Angrivarii Wall), the retrieval of two of Varus' eagles, captures (including Arminius' pregnant wife), the burial of Varus' army, the pushing of the tribes near the Rhine into the interior, as well as devastation and revenge campaigns. Control over the coastal tribes was retained or regained, the Angrivarii and individual tribal chiefs were subjugated. This was offset by enormous losses. The historian Reinhard Wolters assumes that almost as many soldiers fell under Germanicus as in all the Germanic Wars since 12 BC, including Varus' catastrophe. Peter Kehne estimates the losses at 20,000 to 25,000 men.

For the Romans, the dismissal of Germanicus meant the end of the military offensive policy. The concentration of troops in Xanten and Mainz was reduced, and the unified supreme command of the Rhine army ended. The bases on the right bank of the Rhine were abandoned, with the exception of a few places on the North Sea coast and in front of Mainz. Influence on the tribal world continued, but with other means: diplomacy, money and contacts with old allies (for example with the prince of the Ampsivarii and Arminius opponent Boiocalus) were intended to maintain Roman influence east of the Rhine. While the Romans were nevertheless victorious, rather than installing a Roman administration they controlled the region indirectly for centuries, recruiting soldiers there, and playing the tribes off against each other.

=== Germanic balance sheet ===
About Germanic losses, we know for sure they were extremely heavy as well, however no accurate estimates were made.

In 19 or 21 AD, Arminius died, against whom tribes dissatisfied with his claims to pan-Germanic power rebelled. During this internecine war, the leader of the Chatti, Adgandestrius, even offered the Romans to eliminate the leader of the Cherusci if the empire sent him poison. The Senate and the princeps wisely refused. Tacitus believes that they thus equaled in nobility the consuls Fabricius and Aemilius, who rejected a similar offer from the personal physician of King Pyrrhus of Epirus to eliminate their master, but it is more likely that the Romans considered it disadvantageous to disgrace themselves in the eyes of the Germans. Arminius soon fell victim to a conspiracy of his close associates, and the Senate granted Drusus the Younger a triumph, since as a result of his actions there were no tribal unions left in Germany capable of threatening Rome.

=== "... without a doubt the liberator of Germania" ===
The elimination of the Roman threat offered the tribes the opportunity to return to inner-Germanic power politics. As early as 17 AD, Arminius was able to successfully attack the kingdom of the Marcomannic king Marbod in Bohemia. Four years later, however, Arminius fell victim to the Cheruscan nobility and factional conflicts: his own relatives poisoned the Cheruscan prince, probably also to prevent a re-establishment of royal rule in the tribe.

Research considers Arminius' achievements in the years 15 and 16 AD to be decisive. The success of the Germanic tribes was due to the "outstanding strategic skill of Arminius". The creation of a large coalition and warfare without the element of surprise in 9 AD "prove the Cherusci prince to be a truly important politician and military leader of the Germanic tribes". The historical turning point in the conflict between Romans and Germanic tribes was not the battle in 9 AD, but the period of testing in the years that followed, with the climax of the Germanicus campaigns.

This interpretation is consistent with the assessment by Tacitus. Aware of the final renunciation of Germania by Domitian (emperor until 96 AD), the historian judged Arminius around 100 years after the events: "He was without doubt the liberator of Germania, who, unlike other kings and military leaders, did not challenge the Roman people in its early days, but an empire in its full bloom, and fought in battles with varying success, but remained undefeated in war".

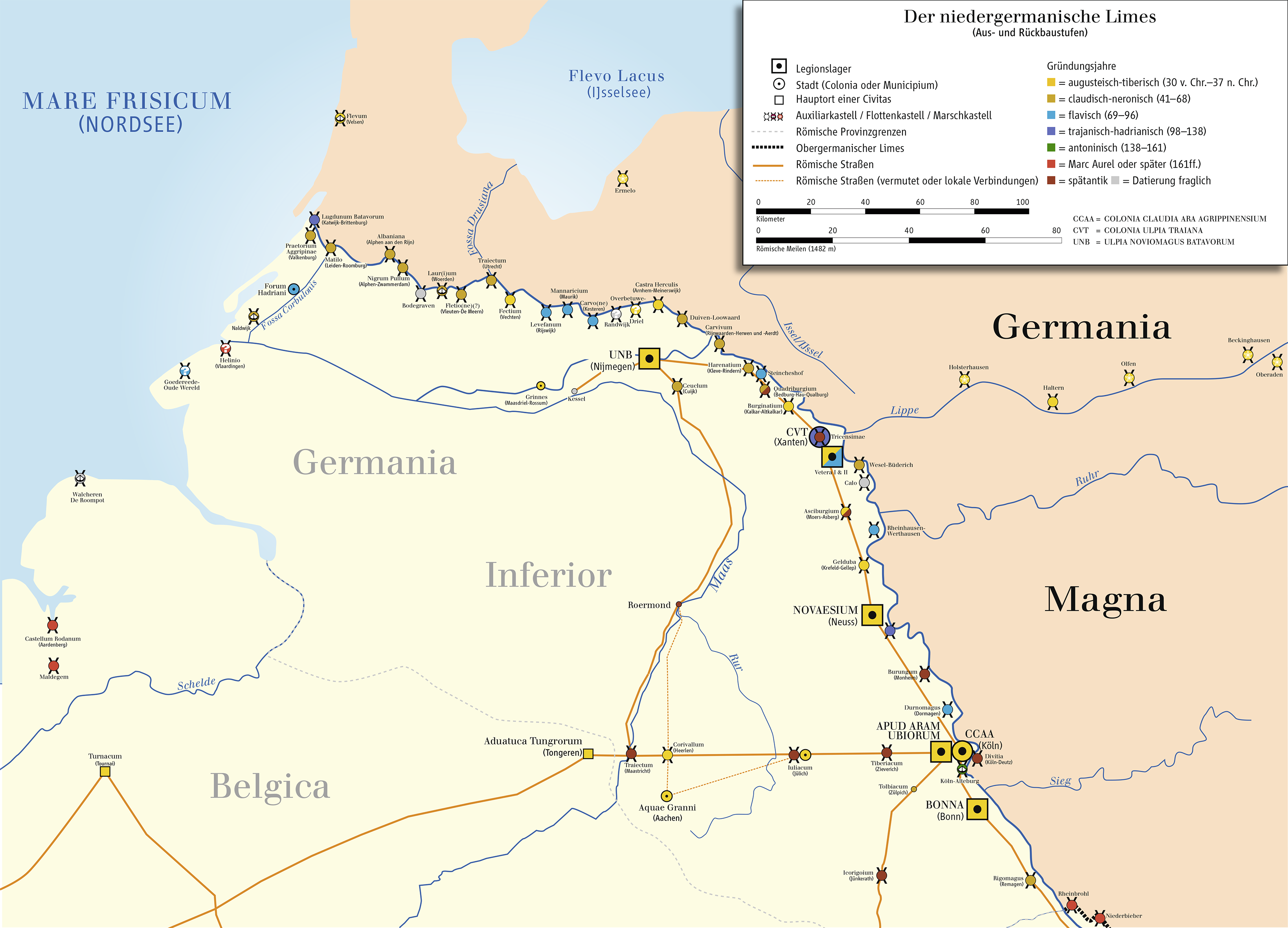
Lower Germanic Limes showing fortifications

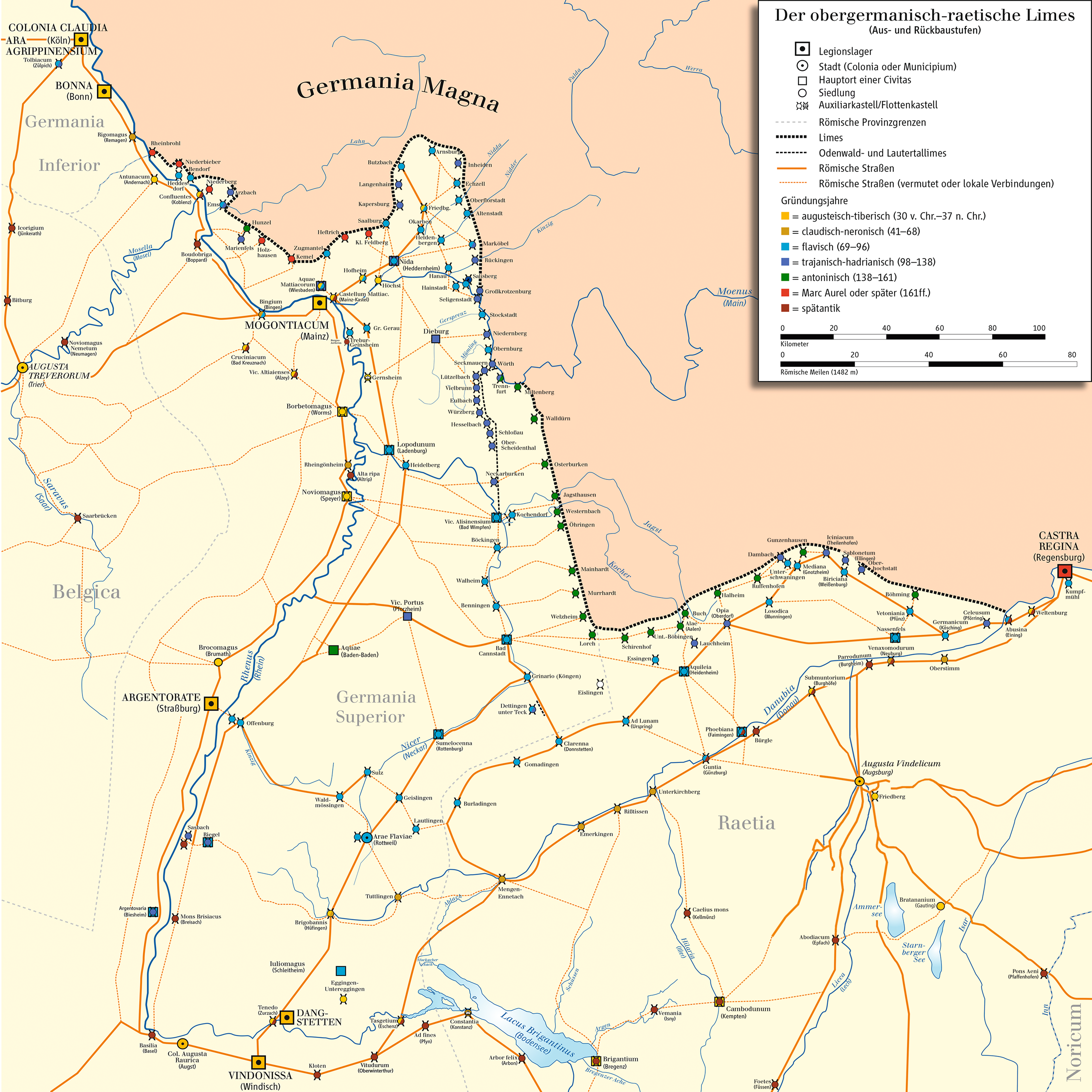
Upper Germanic & Raetian Limes showing forts
