= Italicus (chieftain) =

1st century Germanic Cherusci chieftain

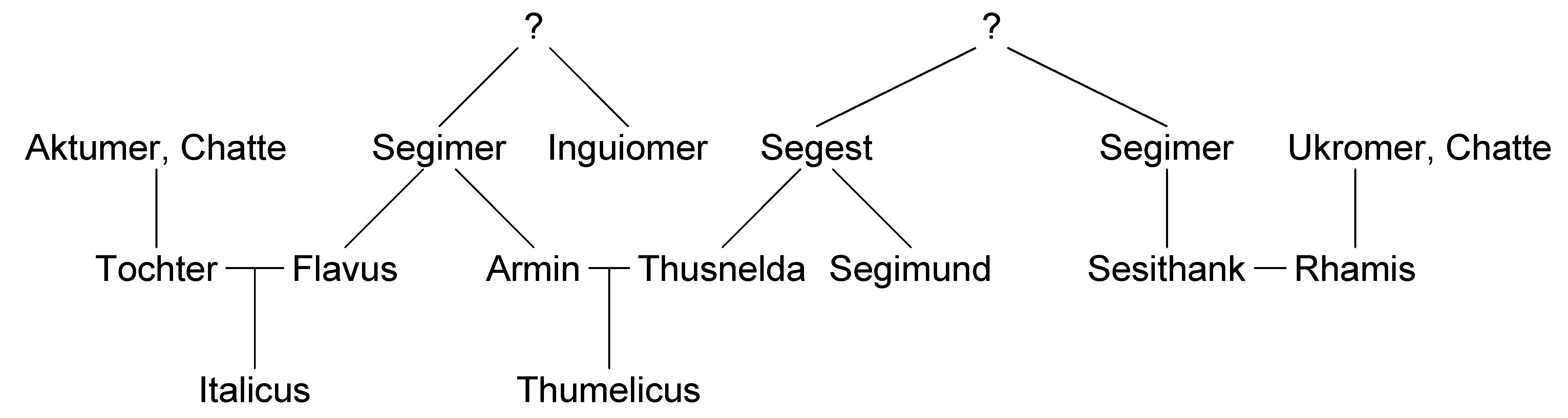
Relatives of Flavus

Italicus (fl. 1st century AD) was a king of the Germanic Cherusci. He is chiefly remembered as the nephew of Arminius.

== Name ==
Like his father Flavus and uncle Arminius, Italicus is only known by his Latin name, which means "the Italian". His original name is unknown.

== Life ==
Italicus was part of the royal family of the Cherusci people in ancient Germany, which was an ally of the early Roman Empire under Augustus. Italicus's father Flavus was a Roman citizen, served in the Roman military, and appears to have remained loyal to Rome when Italicus's grandfather Segimer and uncle Arminius ambushed three legions under P. Quinctilius Varus in the Teutoburg Forest in AD 9. Arminius seems to have succeeded Segimer as king but was challenged by his uncle Inguiomer and the Marcomanni. During Germanicus's reprisal campaigns, Flavus also personally defeated Arminius at the Weser River. Arminius was killed by his father-in-law Segestes in AD 21.

Although Italicus's mother was also German, the daughter of the Chatti king Actumerus, Tacitus wrote in his Annals that Italicus was entirely Romanized by his education. Nonetheless, in AD 47, the Cherusci requested that the emperor Claudius send him to rule them as the only surviving member of his dynasty. Familiar with both Germanic and Roman ways of waging war, Italicus successfully established himself over the Cherusci at first but was then driven into exile. He returned to power with the assistance of the Lombards. He was succeeded as chieftain by Chariomerus, presumably his son, sometime before the Chatti victory over the Cherusci around AD 88.
