= Barbarians (2020 TV series) =

German television series

- Promotional release poster
- German: Barbaren
- Genre: Historical drama; Action
- Starring: Laurence Rupp; Jeanne Goursaud; David Schütter
- Country of origin: Germany
- Original languages: German; Classical Latin
- No. of seasons: 2
- No. of episodes: 12

Production
- Running time: 41–51 minutes
- Production companies: Gaumont Germany (season 1 credited, season 2 uncredited)

Original release
- Network: Netflix
- Release: 23 October 2020 – 21 October 2022

Barbarians (German: Barbaren) is a 2020 German historical war drama television series created by Andreas Heckmann, Arne Nolting, and Jan Martin Scharf. It stars Laurence Rupp, Jeanne Goursaud, and David Schütter. The series is a fictionalized account of events during the Roman Empire's occupation of Germania, and the subsequent rebellion of some Germanic tribes led by Arminius. The series was renewed for season 2 on 10 November 2020. It was released on Netflix on 21 October 2022.

== Plot ==
The story takes place during the Roman occupation of Germania Magna (an area between the Rhine and the Elbe) in the latter part of 9 AD. The Romans had occupied the region for twenty years, and the Germanic tribes are oppressed by the empire's heavy taxes and demands for tribute. Attempts to form a unified Germanic resistance are hampered by petty in-fighting between the tribal chieftains, and the selfish aspirations of certain tribesmen desiring peace with Rome.

Arminius, an eques in the Roman Imperial army, is a member of the Germanic Cherusci tribe who was given away as a hostage to Rome when he was a child, along with his younger brother Flavus, by his father Segimer to ensure peace between his tribe and Rome. He returns to Germania to help Publius Quinctilius Varus (his foster father) maintain order in the region. Upon seeing the atrocities inflicted by Roman soldiers on his former people, he becomes the new chieftain of the Cherusci tribe and ignites a rebellion by finally uniting the tribes with the help of Thusnelda (daughter of Segestes) and Folkwin Wolfspeer, his two best friends during childhood. These events eventually culminate on the date of September 11, 9 AD in a massive ambush of three Roman legions (some 15,000 men) at the Battle of the Teutoburg Forest, where the Germanic people emerge victorious.

== Cast ==
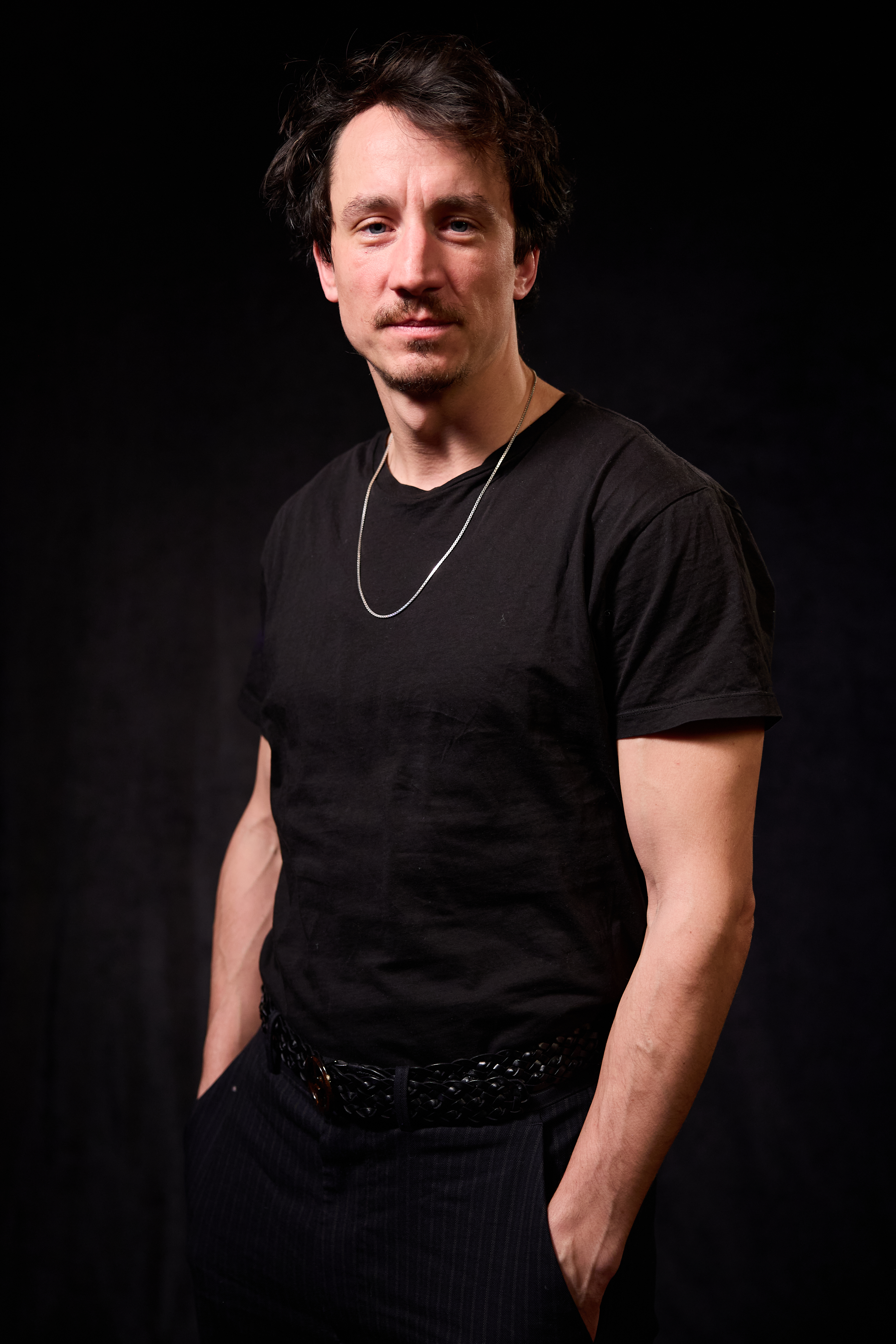
Laurence Rupp at the 2024 Sundance Film Festival

- Laurence Rupp as Arminius (seasons 1–2)
  - Finn Reiter as Young Arminius (season 1)
  - Benedikt Kalcher as Young Arminius (season 2)
- Jeanne Goursaud as Thusnelda (seasons 1–2)
  - Dajana Rajic as Young Thusnelda (season 1)
- David Schütter as Folkwin Wolfspeer (seasons 1-2)
  - Dániel Kaszás as Young Folkwin Wolfspeer (season 1)
- Nicki von Tempelhoff as Segimer, Arminius's father and reik of the Cherusci (season 1)
- Bernhard Schütz as Segestes, Thusnelda's father (seasons 1–2)
- Eva Verena Müller as Irmina, Thusnelda's mother (seasons 1–2)
- Jeremy Miliker as Ansgar, Thusnelda's younger brother (seasons 1–2)
- Peter Moltzen as Wiborg, Folkwin's father (season 1)
- Tünde Nyilas as Ida, Folkwin's mother (season 1)
- Mark Meran as Vegis, Folkwin's younger brother (season 1)
- Gaetano Aronica as Varus, Roman general and Arminius' foster father (season 1)
- Nikolai Kinski as Pelagios, Varus' interpreter (season 1)
- Valerio Morigi as Metellus, Roman centurion (season 1)
- Diego Riace as Quintus, Roman tribune (season 1)
- Florian Schmidtke as Talio, Cheruscan warrior and friend of Arminius (seasons 1–2)
- Ronald Zehrfeld as Berulf, Cheruscan/Bructeri warrior and friend of Folkwin (season 1)
- Mathis Landwehr as Eigil, Cheruscan warrior (season 1)
- Sebastian Griegel as Hanno, Cheruscan warrior (season 1)
- Marlon Boess as Luc, Cheruscan warrior (season 1)
- Urs Rechn as Kunolf, reik of the Bructeri (season 1)
- Marc Ben Puch as Gernot Redbeard, reik of the Bructeri before Kunolf (season 1)
- Matthias Weidenhöfer as Golmad, reik of Bructeri after Kunolf (season 1)
- Sergej Onopko as Hadgan, reik of the Chatti and Thusnelda's bethroted (season 1–2)
- Arved Birnbaum as Aldarich, reik of the Marsi (season 1)
- Denis Schmidt as Rurik, reik of a Germanic tribe (seasons 1–2)
- Sinha Melina Gierke as Raskild, Marcomann slave (season 1)
- Sophie Rois as Runa, Germanic seeress (season 1)
  - Ilknur Boyraz as Runa (season 2)
- Daniel Donskoy as Flavus, Arminius' younger brother (season 2)
  - Samuel Girardi as Young Flavus (season 2)
- Gabriele Rizzoli as Gaius, Arminius' son (season 2)
- Giovanni Carta as Tiberius, Roman general and Emperor Augustus' stepson (season 2)
- Alessandro Fella as Germanicus, Roman general and Tiberius' adopted son (season 2)
- Murathan Muslu as Marbod, reik of the Marcomanni (season 2)
  - Ilyes Raoul as Young Marbod (season 2)
- Katharina Heyer as Odarike, Marbod's wife (season 2)
- Cynthia Micas as Dido, former Carthaginian slave (season 2)
  - Sofia Koval as Young Dido (season 2)
- David Wurawa as Dido's father (season 2)
- Robert Maaser as Odvulf, Cheruscan warrior (season 2)

== Episodes ==
=== Series overview ===
Season	Episodes	Originally released
1	6	October 23, 2020
2	6	October 21, 2022

=== Season 1 (2020) ===
No. overall	No. in season	Title	Directed by	Written by	Original release date
1	1	"Wolf and Eagle"	Barbara Eder	Jan Martin Scharf, Arne Nolting, Andreas Heckmann	October 23, 2020
Cherusci tribal chief Segimer bristles at the increasing demands of new governor Varus but would prefer to keep peaceful relations with them, since his son Arminius is serving in the Roman army. This leads to arguments with neighboring tribes. Thusnelda, a young woman in the tribe, is being pulled into an arranged marriage to improve relations with a neighboring tribe. She is actually in love with another young man named Folkwin. When the Romans come to their town and demand more tribute (what the tribal folk have assembled is not enough) they demand the leader kneel and kiss their golden eagle statue. Just as the village Latin interpreter, Segestes (Thusnelda's father), is about to do so for him, Thusnelda intervenes. The Romans drag her around then seriously injure her brother Ansgar when he tries to save her. As revenge, Thusnelda and Folkwin infiltrate the Roman base pretending to offer Thusnelda as a prostitute. They kill a Roman general, burn down his tent and cause chaos at the Roman base while stealing the golden eagle. Arminius assembles a team to systematically search through the tribal villages to find the perpetrators and bring back the eagle. Thusnelda and Folkwin bring the eagle back to their village and everyone throws a party. Segimer expresses fear about the upcoming war, and while Thusnelda and Folkwin have sex, the Romans arrive. Arminius greets his father.
2	2	"Vengeance"	Barbara Eder	Jan Martin Scharf, Arne Nolting, Andreas Heckmann	October 23, 2020
In a flashback, Arminius, Thusnelda and Folkwin were good friends, and they keep the teeth of a wolf they dismembered the day before Arminius his brother were conscripted into the Roman army in order to keep peace. In the present, the Romans are losing their minds looking for the golden eagle. Arminius tries to talk sense into the village but gets into a fight with Berulf, which Folkwin saves him from. A now-adult Arminius is still salty at his Dad for giving him up to the Romans. While Segimer is busy trying to stop Berulf from trying to kill him, Arminius makes off with the eagle. Folkwin catches up with him and insults him for trying to retrieve the stolen property but he is beaten unconscious by Arminius. Varus, the adopted father of Arminius, intimidates Segimer when he doesn't tell the location of Folkwin. Segestes rats them out, and they crucify Folkwin's entire family. Folkwin arrives just in time to see them all dead. Berulf finds him and they both vow to fight back. Arriving at the Roman base, Arminius is ordered to bring back Folkwin's head.
3	3	"On the Edge"	Barbara Eder	Jan Martin Scharf, Arne Nolting, Andreas Heckmann	October 23, 2020
Despite getting the Eagle back, the Romans are still obsessed with hunting down Folkwin. After very emotional deliberation, the village folk tear down the crucifiction crosses just as the Romans show up again. They reiterate that the entire village will suffer the same fate if Folkwin is not turned over. At the cremation, Angsar (who has become severely mentally disabled following his injury) runs around yelling "they are burning" to the embarrassment of Thusnelda's family. Folkwin's militia grows in size but at a secret meeting, a surprise attack kills many of their members. Thusnelda is caught trying to escape in the middle of the night and is tied to a pole inside her house. Thusnelda's mother tries to make Angsar fall off a cliff. Segestes has a change of heart and lets Thusnelda run out after them, and she saves Angsar at the last possible second. She heads back into the woods with Angsar to find Folkwin, while Hadgan, the man who she was betrothed to, arrives and berates her family because she was not there. The Romans arrest then kill a runway rebel after he gives them information on Folkwin's whereabouts. The Romans arrive at the hiding place and kill everyone except Folkwin. When it is Arminius' turn to kill Folkwin, he cannot bring himself to do it and instead teamkills, to the shock of Folkwin.
4	4	"A New Reik"	Barbara Eder	Jan Martin Scharf, Arne Nolting, Andreas Heckmann	October 23, 2020
Arminius and Folkwin reconcile by a fire. Arminius beheads a random dead rebel and brings it back to the Romans claiming it is Folkwin. The Romans make Arminius the new Reik. Arminius wanted to go instead back to Rome, but the Romans won't take him because he is Germanic by blood. This greatly disappoints him. An officer tells Arminius that one of his troops survived; he goes to the medical tent and chokes him to death, in the presence of Talio, a man from the village. Back at the rebel meeting, Folkwin and Thusnelda propose more attacks. After being rebuffed, Folkwin kills the ringleader; Thusnelda dissects his heart and smears its blood over Folkwin's face. Segestes proclaims himself the new Reik. Talio knows the head stuck on a pole is not that of Folkwin's and tries to blackmail Arminius into giving him land and money in exchange for silence. A neighboring tribe terrorizes the village and threatens to rape and kill all their women, just as the Romans arrive and shut them down. At another town meeting, Arminius ticks off Segentes by proclaiming himself as the Reik. Folkwin is planning an ambush against the Roman base while Arminius, alone and in Germanic clothes, pulls up. He proposes to Thusnelda, causing Folkwin to punch him.
5	5	"Treason"	Stephen St. Leger	Jan Martin Scharf, Arne Nolting, Andreas Heckmann	October 23, 2020
Folkwin's anger has subsided. Everyone agrees to pretend he is dead to prevent further bloodshed. Arminius and Thusnelda forge a political marriage as she believes it is the best way to bring down the Romans. Some local tribal chiefs bring gag gifts, others are disgusted, but some are actually useful. The couple initiates the ceremony (although he recognizes she loves Folkwin instead). Meanwhile, Folkwin sits by a fire alone; the Romans catch up to him and capture him. Arminius is led to a dead body and told it is Folkwin, but the real Folkwin is sitting in a Roman prison cell. Meeting with Varus, he orders all Reiks to hand over one child as punishment for continued attacks. The policy proves deeply unpopular at first, but he rounds up all the village heads in a meeting to alleviate concerns and discuss strategy. Folkwin sneaks out a message that he is alive as Arminius continues planning the ambush. Arminius gives the Romans battle plans to take out one rebellious village, only for Segestes to show up and tell the Romans that Arminius is planning to betray them.
6	6	"The Battle"	Stephen St. Leger	Jan Martin Scharf, Arne Nolting, Andreas Heckmann	October 23, 2020
Arminius confirms everything that Segestes said, causing Varus to laugh and successfully disguising it as a prank, later freeing Folkwin. Roman soldiers start amassing and Thusnelda starts praying, only for Hadgan to arrive, sexually assault and attempt to rape her. Suddenly some of the legions want to call off the attack but the delusional Thusnelda stabs her own eye to convince them to stay. Since the Romans are moving in a long line, they first cut down trees to split them into small groups, then attack one by one, destroying much of the Roman army with little resistance. Surviving units gather in an open field which has been booby trapped with flammables. The Barbarians engage in open combat as rain starts falling. Varus, extremely disappointed in what his adopted son has become, decides to ditch all his armor and picks up the sword Arminius dropped, killing himself with it. Segestes beheads him and Arminius spends all night giving motivational speeches to the severed head propped up on a stick. As some Barbarians hang the Roman soldiers and feast on their internal organs, Thusnelda learns she is pregnant by Folkwin.

=== Season 2 (2022) ===
No. overall	No. in season	Title	Directed by	Written by	Original release date
7	1	"New Legions"	Stefan Ruzowitzky	Katrin Milhahn, Antonia Rothe-Liermann	October 21, 2022
After the battle of Teutoburg, Arminius (Ari) suspects the Romans of rebuilding their forces and seeks help from Marbod, an eastern tribal chief, to protect his people. Flavus, Arminius' brother, arrives in Germania to reclaim his honor as a Roman since he was disgraced by his brother’s betrayal of their adoptive father Varus and the Romans. Back in the forest, in front of all the tribes, Ari declares that he should be king and that the tribes need to unite to defend their land from the Romans. Marbod stands next to Ari as if they were united but asks why they are at war again when Ari had promised the last battle would dispel the Romans. Marbod says that many have died and many more will die with more war, and he encourages the tribes to instead trade and prosper in partnership with the Romans. Afterwards, Ari confronts Marbod in the woods about why he changed his tune in front of the tribes. Then, Flavus, in his Roman regalia, comes out from behind a tree and confronts Ari. Flavus says that Ari ruined his life. They fight. As Ari is about to kill Flavus, Marbod knocks Ari out with a rock.
8	2	"Captured"	Stefan Ruzowitzky	Katrin Milhahn, Antonia Rothe-Liermann	October 21, 2022
Ari is carried into the Roman camp as a prisoner. Thusnelda enlists her former lover Folkwin and his wife to infiltrate the Roman camp to save Arminius. Marbod and Flavus meet. They are revealed to be former lovers. The next morning, as Flavus prepares to return to Rome, Thusnelda and her crew successfully break Ari out of the camp. Ari brings his son Gaius with them against his will. Roman soldiers chase them into the forest but are killed. One Roman soldier is spared to give Tiberius a message. Marbod meets with Tiberius in a bid to secure peace.
9	3	"Fathers"	Stefan Ruzowitzky	Jason George	October 21, 2022
After the prison break, Arminius takes his son Gaius back to the village. Thusnelda is upset with Ari for not mentioning his Roman wife and son. At the Roman camp, Flavus is arrested by Germanicus for his alleged collusion in Ari's escape. Flavus denies this since he captured Ari and brought him to the camp. Flavus says that if he is killed, Marbod and his 70,000 men will join forces with Ari. This spares his life. In the forest, Ari tries to convince the tribal leaders to ally against Marbod and the Romans. However, the tribes see Ari’s capture as a sign from the gods that Ari’s path is not to be followed. Ari is frustrated and continues trying to convince his allies that Marbod is the real traitor and that Marbod’s alliance with the Romans will ultimately lead to the destruction of all tribes.
10	4	"The Oath"	Lennart Ruff	Kseniya Melnik	October 21, 2022
Tiberius requires a test of loyalty from Marbod and sends Flavus in the enemy camp to dispatch the message. The tribal chief gets drunk and attempts to fight and kill Arminius. Gaius frees Flavus by whacking Marbod on the head with a piece of metal and flees. Gaius arrives at the nearby Roman camp to tell Germanicus that he can lead them to the folkmoot to eliminate all of the barbarian chiefs. Folkwin knows, and to avoid Thumelicus, renounces and sacrifices his son to save Thusnelda at the folkmoot.
11	5	"Doomed"	Lennart Ruff	Jason George, Kseniya Melnik	October 21, 2022
At the meeting, Marbod is declared king. His wife is killed by the Romans, and now he demands justice. Thusnelda and Folkwin set out on a mission to convince the entire eastern army to join the Cherusci. On the long journey, Thusnelda confirms that she still loves Arminius. Gaius, while hiding in the woods, stumbles upon the two and tells them an important discovery: Roman troops are spotted on ships, heading towards the camp.
12	6	"The Price"	Stefan Ruzowitzky	Jason George	October 21, 2022
After the shocking revelation, the only way for the outnumbered Cherusci to win is to overwhelm the Roman camp before the new legion arrives. Segestes approaches Tiberius with a self-serving proposal. Arminius, Thusnelda, Folkwin, and the rest of the tribes prepare for the final battle. During the battle, Flavus manages to free himself, fights his way to Marbod, and dies in his arms after saving him. Dido confronts Germanicus. Folkwin searches for Germanicus but is fatally stabbed. Segestes' treachery is revealed. Despite the victory, Tiberius executes Thusnelda's parents and takes her baby as a hostage and her as a slave to Rome, thus continuing the cycle.

== Production and background ==
The shooting took place in Budapest from 12 August to 30 November 2019. The series was produced by the German Gaumont GmbH, a subsidiary of the French Gaumont (producers Sabine de Mardt, Andreas Bareiss, and Ranier Marquass.)

Christian Stassinger was in charge of the camera. Esther Walz was responsible for costume design, Thomas Stammer for the production design and Iris Baumuller for the casting. The first four episodes were staged by Austrian director Barbara Eder, and the final two episodes directed by Irishman Steve St. Leger, who had also worked on Vikings. During the production, the makers of the television series took advice from historians.

At the start of the series, Netflix advertised in Bielefeld with the text Nobody conquers the Teutoburg Forest. This is an allusion to the chants by DSC Arminia Bielefeld. Hermann is the namesake of the football club.

== Reception ==
Thomas Grueter judged in the science portal Spektrum that the overall impression of the series remains ambivalent. "It vividly shows the two irreconcilable cultures. The Latin dialogues of the Romans are a highlight. Costumes, props and buildings were very well done, the equipment of the Roman legionaries corresponded to historical reality, and the Germanic longhouses looked amazingly authentic. Despite some weaknesses, the series is exciting and worth seeing if you don't make too many demands on the historical accuracy of the plot."

For Forbes, film historian Sheena Scott rated Barbarians as "an excellent series that reveals a key historical event in Europe through a gripping tale of love, friendship, betrayal and revenge" and praised the "excellent production design, great performances, especially the main trio Jeanne Goursaud, David Schütter and Laurence Rupp, and the wonderful cinematography of the series."

Journalist Andreas Fischer of the Weser-Kurier remarked that the "biggest dilemma was the supposed historicity of the series. In the cloak of a history lesson, this half-knowledge spreads, the historical background is reduced to a few key facts and only serves as a legitimization for the German variant of the mixture of love, violence and Norse mythology that has been in fashion since Game of Thrones and Vikings.

The expectation that paid streaming services like Netflix have to stand out from the evening entertainment program is not fulfilled for the journalist Ambros Waibel from the newspaper Taz with Barbarians. The series remains, "apart from a bit of clean nudity here and a few dirty beheadings there, stuck in a Germany as a 'Terra X'-Rubbish and is therefore as superfluous as a Suebian knot." Waibel sees the entertainment aspect neglected and instead cites a "contemporary sword-and-sandal film" as a reference point in the genre of The Eagle.'

Archaeologist Matthias Wemhoff in the Frankfurter Allgemeine Zeitung criticized the depiction of Germania, shown in the agriculture, as a "dark, impenetrable forest landscape" as well as a cliched impression of a "rough, linguistically completely ignorant" rural society, which reflects the "complex canon of behavior in a group that has been relatively firmly established over centuries" as not fair. Prehistorian Karl Banghard, also in the FAZ, opined that the series "had little to do with the everyday history of the 'turning point'"; specifically, he complained about the numerous historical inaccuracies, for example in relation to nutrition and clothing, but above all the distribution of roles between the "imperialist Romans against the indigenous Germans." The series tells "the story of the great ethnic resistance struggle" and "mindlessly rehashes the national historical narratives of the 19th Century."

At the start of the series, journalist and archaeologist Sascha Priester illuminated the historical background of the Varus events. He called for a clear distinction between cinema "in the imagination", fiction and what can be really considered scientifically proven today. The general idea of the "Varus battle" – with ambushes, entrenchments or a contiguous battlefield – must be questioned again and again. Due to the constantly new archaeological findings from the Fund region of Kalkriese, a presumed scene of the events, this picture will be continuously changed, enriched and refined. On the occasion of the first season release, he exchanged views in the SWR2-Forum with Heidrun Derks, Reinhard Wolters and moderator Gregor Papschout. The group discussed the conflict within the protagonist Arminius and the confrontation between the tribes and the great power Rome, the genre of the weak versus the strong. The experts agreed that the series wants to entertain but largely avoids the false historic pathos and the historical term 'Germanic peoples' is skillfully circumnavigated. For the scientific understanding of the term "barbarians", Sascha Priester noted the possible ambiguous understanding of the series title for some viewers, who think less archaeologically and historically, but above all judge and evaluate the character of the people playing: "Who are the barbarians of this series? Because the Romans, the supposed bearers of civilization, are very violent and barbaric."

In the first four weeks of the release of the episodes, more than 37 million households watched the series.
