= Battle of Idistaviso =

Battle between Roman legions and Germanic peoples in 16 AD

Coordinates: 53°32′8″N 8°33′56″E

Battle of the Weser River
- Part of the Roman campaigns in Germania (12 BC – AD 16) and the Roman–Germanic Wars
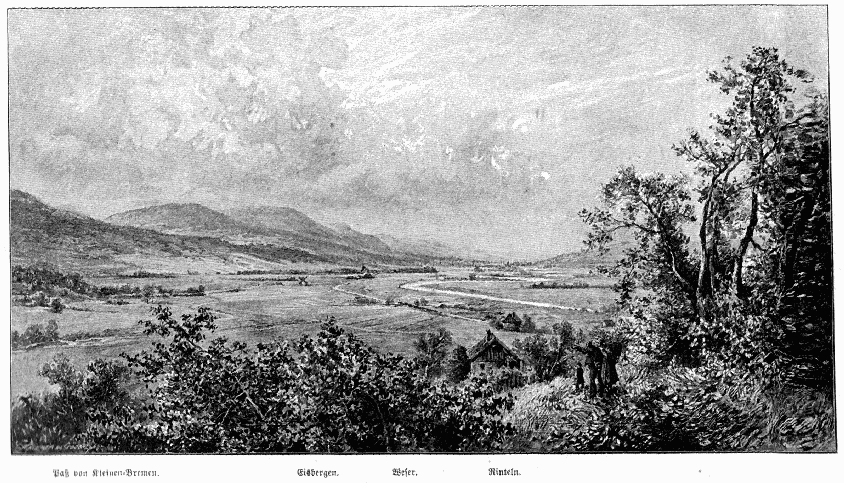
- The field of Idistaviso, c. 1895
Date	16 AD
Location	On the Weser River, Germania
Result	Roman victory

Belligerents
Roman Empire	Germanic tribes

Commanders and leaders
Germanicus; Flavus; Chariovalda †	Arminius (WIA); Inguiomer (WIA)

Strength
8 legions 26 cohorts 8 alae Praetorian Guard; Additional allied Germanic contingents Total: at least 60,000 men	Unknown

Casualties and losses
Unknown	Unknown

The Battle of the Weser River, sometimes known as the First Battle of Minden or Battle of Idistaviso, was fought in 16 AD between Roman legions commanded by Roman Emperor Tiberius's heir and adopted son, Germanicus, and an alliance of Germanic peoples, commanded by Arminius. The battle marked the end of a three-year series of campaigns by Germanicus in Germania.

== Background ==
The Germanic chief, Arminius, had been instrumental in the organising of the Battle of the Teutoburg Forest, in which three Roman legions moving west to winter quarters were ambushed and annihilated by allied Germanic forces in the deep forests of western Germania. That defeat plagued the Roman psyche, and revenge and the neutralisation of the threat of Arminius were the impetus for Germanicus' campaign. In the year before the battle, 15 AD, Germanicus had marched against the Chatti and then against the Cherusci under Arminius. During that campaign, the Romans advanced along the region of the Teutoburg Forest, where the legions had been massacred and buried the bones of the Roman soldiers that still lay there. The eagle of the annihilated nineteenth legion was also recovered.

Skirmishes with the Germans were constant, but the Romans could not draw them into open battle.

== Location ==
Ancient sources identify the location as Idistavisus, but the precise location is unknown except that it was on the right side of the Weser River, somewhere between the cities of Minden and Hamelin in what is now Germany.

== Battle ==
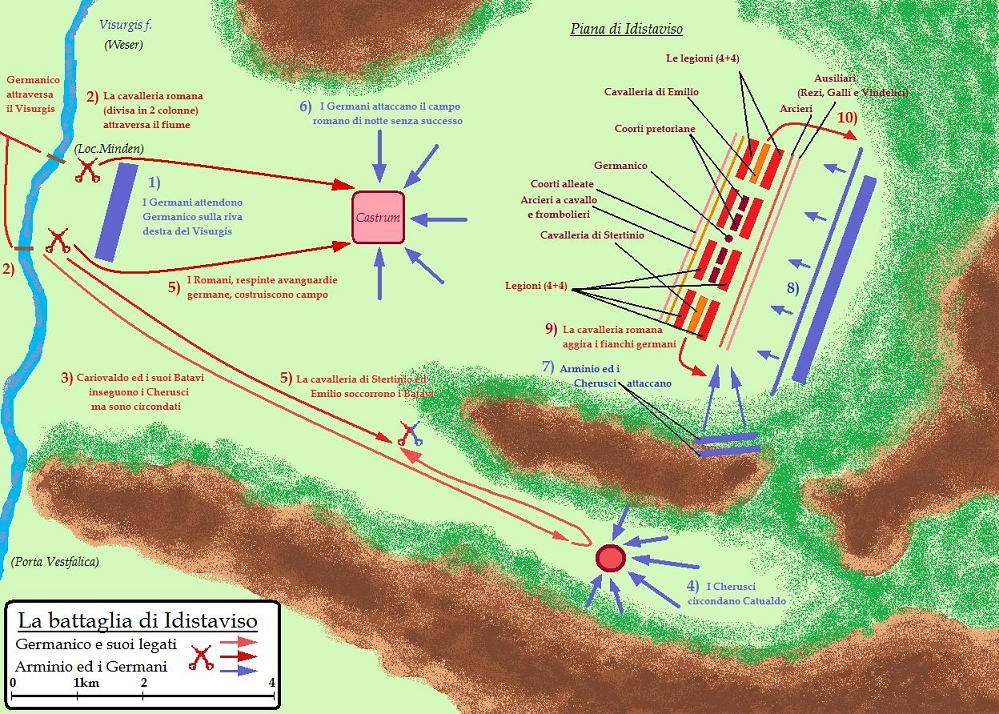
The plain of Idistaviso and the battle between Romans and Germans.

The Germanic tribes generally avoided open large-scale combat, but by repeated Roman incursions deep into Germanic territory, Germanicus was able to force Arminius, at the head of a large but fractious coalition, into response. The Romans, along with the Chauci, who fought for Romans as auxiliaries, defeated the allied Germanic forces and inflicted heavy losses on them. Arminius and his uncle Inguiomer were wounded in the battle, but both evaded capture. The retreating Germanic army was cut down in every quarter. Many attempting to swim across the Weser died from a storm of projectiles or by the force of the current. Many others climbed the tops of trees, and while they were hiding themselves in the boughs, the Romans brought archers up to shoot them down.

According to Tacitus, "[f]rom nine in the morning to nightfall the [Germans] were slaughtered, and ten miles were covered with arms and dead bodies." The Roman soldiers involved on the battlefield hailed Tiberius as imperator and raised a pile of arms as a trophy with the names of the defeated tribes inscribed beneath them.

== Aftermath ==
The sight of the Roman trophy constructed on the battlefield enraged the Germans who were preparing to retreat beyond the Elbe, and they launched an attack on the Roman positions at the Angrivarian Wall, thus beginning a second battle. The Romans had anticipated the attack and again routed the Germans. Germanicus stated that he did not want any prisoners, as the extermination of the Germanic tribes was the only conclusion he saw for the war. The victorious Romans then raised a mound with the inscription: "The army of Tiberius Caesar, after thoroughly conquering the tribes between the Rhine and the Elbe, has dedicated this monument to Mars, Jupiter, and Augustus."

Afterwards, Germanicus ordered Caius Silius to march against the Chatti with a mixed force of 3,000 cavalry and 33,000 infantry and lay waste their territory. Meanwhile, Germanicus himself, with a larger army, invaded the Marsi for the third time and devastated their land. He forced Mallovendus, the defeated leader of the Marsi, to reveal the location of another of the three legion's eagles lost in AD 9. Immediately Germanicus despatched troops to recover it. The Romans advanced into the country, defeating any foe they encountered.

Germanicus then withdrew his soldiers behind the Rhine for the winter. According to Tacitus, it was taken as certain that the Germanic tribes were considering suing for peace, and that an additional campaign in the next summer would end the war. However, Tiberius advised Germanicus to return to Rome, writing to him that while "[h]e had fought victorious battles on a great scale; he should also remember those losses which the winds and waves had inflicted, and which, though due to no fault of the general, were still grievous and shocking" and that "since the vengeance of Rome had been satisfied, [the Germans] might be left to their internal feuds." Germanicus was granted a triumph on May 26, AD 17 in exchange for his return from Germania.

== In fiction ==
In Mikhail Bulgakov's The Master and Margarita, the procurator of Judea, Pontius Pilate, states that he had fought in this battle.

== Bibliography ==
=== Primary sources ===
- Tacitus, Cornelius (2008). Barrett, Anthony (ed.). The Annals: The Reigns of Tiberius, Claudius, and Nero. Oxford University Press. ISBN 9780192824219.

=== Secondary sources ===
- Bulgakov, Mikhail (2006). Master And Margarita. Lulu Press.
- Dando-Collins, Stephen (2010). Legions of Rome. New York: St. Martin's Press.
- Seager, Robin (2008), Tiberius, John Wiley & Sons, ISBN 978-0470775417
- Shotter, David (2004). Tiberius Caesar. Routledge. ISBN 1134364180.
- Wells, Peter S. (2003). The Battle That Stopped Rome. Norton. ISBN 978-0-393-32643-7.
