= Segimer =

Chief of the Cherusci in Germania

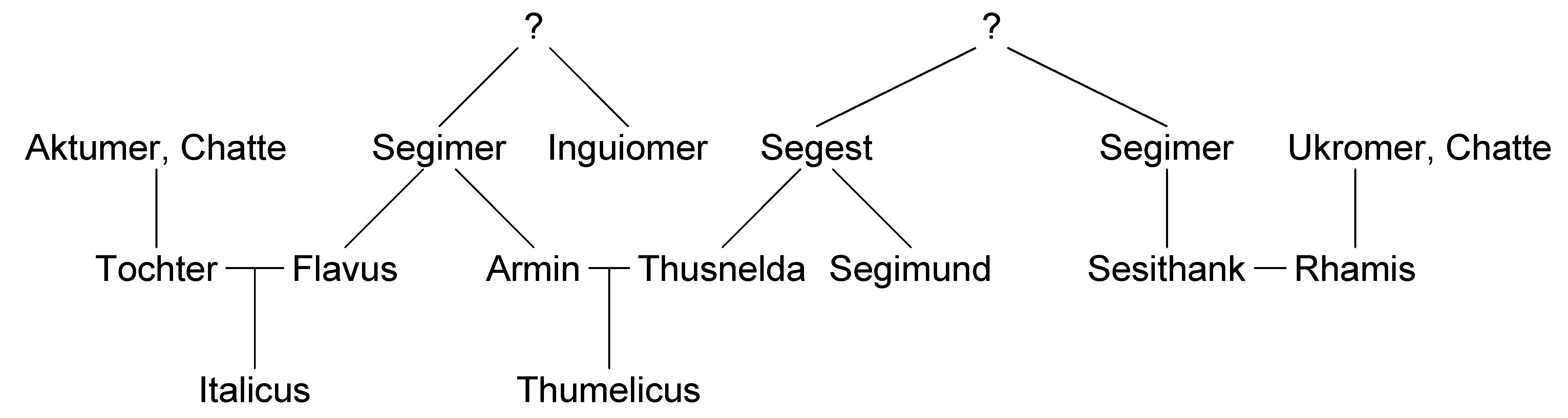
Relatives of Segimer

Segimer or Sigimer (Latin: Segimerus or Sigimerus; fl. 1st century BC) was a chieftain of the Germanic Cherusci tribe. He is remembered in history as the father of Arminius, who led the Germans to victory over the Romans at Teutoburg Forest in AD 9.

== Life ==
Segimer was a chief of the Cherusci during the late 1st century BC and early 1st century AD. He may have led the Cherusci in their successful ambush of Drusus's army at Arbalo in the summer or autumn of 11 BC. By winter, Drusus was maintaining a Roman garrison in Cherusci territory and, following Drusus's campaigns, the Cherusci became an ally of the Roman Empire. Segimer had two sons, known only by their Latin names Arminius and Flavus. They were closely involved with the Romans and both joined the Roman military. His son Arminius led the Germans to victory over three Roman legions in the Battle of Teutoburg Forest in AD 9. Cassius Dio's account of the battle includes that Segimer was Arminius's second in command during the battle. Segimer is not mentioned by Tacitus in his accounts of Germanicus's subsequent reprisal campaigns in Germany, although his uncle Inguiomer appears. Arminius appears to have succeeded Segimer as chieftain at some point in the early 1st century AD and was subsequently attacked by the Marcomanni chieftain Maroboduus together with his uncle Inguiomer in AD 17 or 18.

Segimer's son Flavus appears to have remained loyal to Rome throughout the period and his son Italicus succeeded Arminius as chieftain with Roman assistance.

== See also ==
- Barbarians, a 2020 TV show in which Segimer appears
