= Inguiomer =

Chieftain of the Cherusci in the early 1st century AD

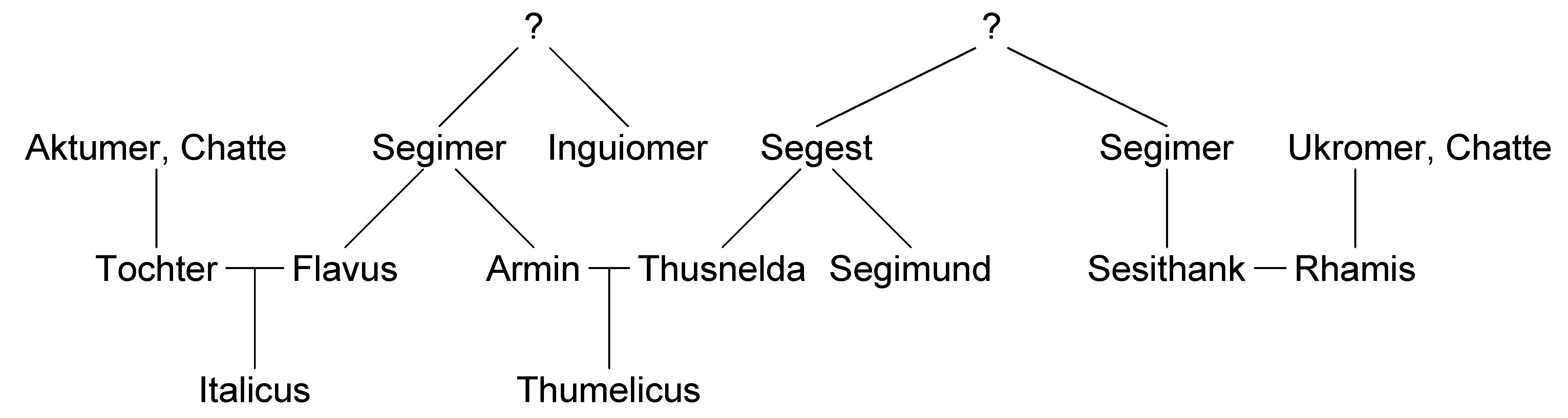
Relatives of Inguiomer

Inguiomer or Ingomar (Latin: Inguiomerus; fl. 1st century AD) was a leader of the Cherusci. He is chiefly remembered as the uncle of Arminius.

== Name ==
Alexander Haggerty Krappe proposed the name Inguiomer derives from Old Germanic *Ingwia, related to Yngvi, the older name of the Germanic god Freyr.

== Life ==
Inguiomer was the brother of Segimer, a chieftain of the Germanic Cherusci tribe. This made him the uncle of Arminius and Flavus. Inguiomer is mentioned in Tacitus's account of the Roman reprisal campaigns of Germanicus against the Germans after their defeat at Teutoburg Forest. In AD 15, he is mentioned arguing against Arminius's defensive strategy. He pursued the retreating army of Caecina across rough terrain, suffering a defeat in which he was personally wounded. Inguiomer is also mentioned joining the Marcomanni chieftain Maroboduus in his war against Arminius in AD 17 or 18. He died at some point before AD 47, when the Cherusci are recorded appealing to Rome for Inguiomer's grandnephew Italicus as the only surviving member of their royal family.

== See also ==
- Roman historiography
