= Mallovendus =

Early 1st century chieftain of the Germanic Marsi

Mallovendus was a chieftain of the Germanic Marsi.

== Life ==
The only source on Mallovendus is the Annals by Roman historian Tacitus. The Marsi were part of the coalition which under Arminius had rebelled against Roman rule and defeated the Romans at the Battle of the Teutoburg Forest in 9 AD. By 11 AD, the Marsi were suffering from retaliatory measures from the Romans. After this time, Mallovendus is referred to as the chieftain of the Marsi. In the fall of 14 AD, Roman general Germanicus massacred the Marsi and destroyed their temple to the goddess Tamfana. Mallovendus appeared to have survived this massacre. In 15/16 AD he submitted to the Romans, although part of his tribe continued to resist Germanicus. In the fall of 16 AD, he told Germanicus the hiding place for one of the eagles captured by Arminius at the Battle of the Teutoburg Forest. Mallovendus subsequently disappears from the historical record. He is not mentioned among the prisoners that were part of the triumph of Germanicus in 17 AD.

== Sources ==
- P. Cornelius Tacitus Annalen. Lateinisch-Deutsch. Hg. von Erich Heller. Mit einer Einführung von Manfred Fuhrmann. (= Sammlung Tusculum). 6. Auflage, Patmos Verlag GmbH & Co. KG/ Artemis & Winkler Verlag, Mannheim 2010, ISBN 978-3-538-03542-3.
- Peter Kehne: Mallovendus. In: Reallexikon der Germanischen Altertumskunde (RGA). 2. Auflage. Band 19, Walter de Gruyter, Berlin / New York 2001, ISBN 3-11-017163-5, S. 190–191.(kostenpflichtig via Germanische Altertumskunde Online bei de Gruyter)
- Rudolf Much: Rezension: Wilhelm Bruckner, Die Sprache der Langobarden. In: Göttingische gelehrte Anzeigen, Band 158, 2, 1896, S. 888–904; hier 201.
- Robert Nedoma: Personennamen in südgermanischen Runeninschriften. Studien zur altgermanischen Namenkunde I, 1, 1. (= Indogermanische Bibliothek. 3. Reihe: Untersuchungen). Universitätsverlag Winter, Heidelberg 2004, ISBN 978-3-8253-1646-4, S. 372ff.
- Hermann Reichert: Lexikon der altgermanischen Namen, Band I, Teil 1: Textband, Teil 2: Register. (= Thesaurus Palaeogermanicus, 1,1,2) Unter Mitarbeit von Wilibald Kraml und Robert Nedoma. Verlag der Österreichischen Akademie der Wissenschaften, Wien 1987–1990, ISBN 978-3-7001-0931-0, ISBN 978-3-7001-1718-6, Teil 1 S. 486, Teil 2 S. 570, 648.
