= Flavus (son of Segimerus) =

Member of Germanic tribe (died before 47 CE)

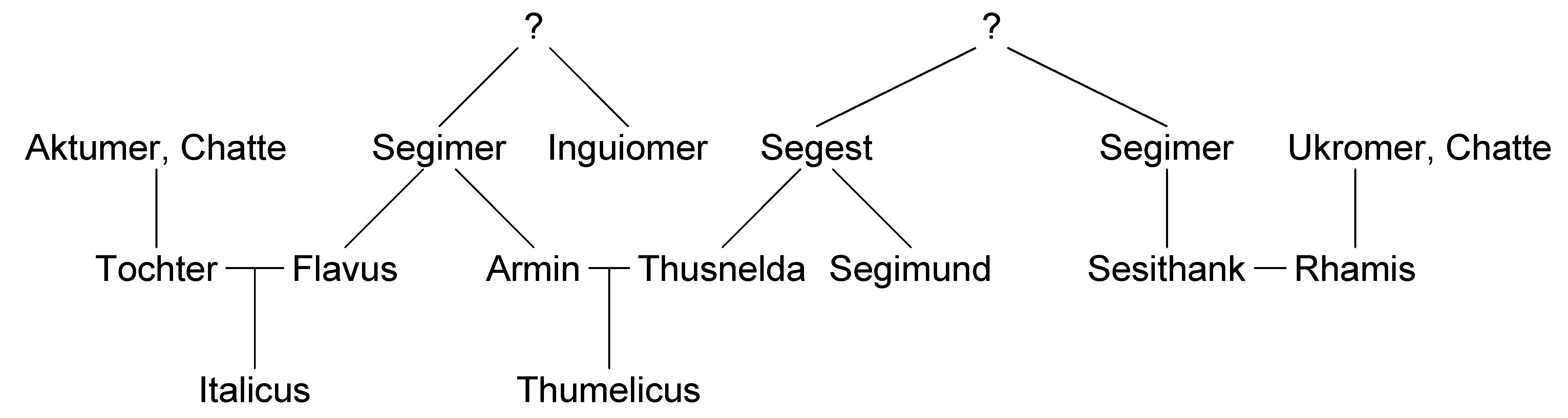
Relatives of Flavus

Flavus was a member of the royal family of the Germanic Cherusci tribe who served in the Roman military. He is chiefly remembered as the younger brother of Arminius, who led the Germans to victory over the Romans at Teutoburg Forest in AD 9.

== Name ==
Neither Arminius nor Flavus are Old Germanic names. Flavus is simply Latin for "yellow", "golden", or "blond" and presumably indicates that Flavus had fair hair. His original name is unknown.

== Life ==
Flavus was the son of the Cheruscan chieftain Segimer and the younger brother of Arminius. His father was a Roman ally under Augustus and both boys were given Roman citizenship and served in the Roman military. As an equite auxiliary, Flavus lost one of his eyes at the siege of Andetrium in AD 9 during the Illyrian Revolt. In the same year, his father Segimer and brother Arminius defeated three Roman legions at Teutoburg Forest. Flavus seems to have remained loyal to Rome and continued serving in its army. Under Tiberius, he was involved in the Roman reprisal campaigns in Germany and he defeated his brother at Weser River. After this battle, the Romans withdrew across the Rhine.

Flavus seems to have died before AD 47 when the Cherusci are recorded appealing to Rome to send his son Italicus—the last surviving member of their royal family—to lead them.
