= Tony Clunn =

Discovered the main site of the Battle of the Teutoburg Forest at Kalkriese Hill

John Anthony Spencer Clunn MBE (10 May 1946 – 3 August 2014) was a major in the British Army, and a metal detectorist who discovered the main site of the Battle of the Teutoburg Forest at Kalkriese Hill.

== Army career ==
Born in Kent, Clunn served in the ranks of the Royal Tank Regiment, rising to the rank of warrant officer class 1. He was then commissioned into the administrative section of the Royal Army Medical Corps as a lieutenant on 2 January 1986. His commission was backdated, with seniority as a second lieutenant from 2 July 1981, and as lieutenant from 2 July 1983. He was promoted captain on 2 January 1988. He was promoted major on 30 September 1994, having previously held the rank on an acting basis. Appointed Member of the Order of the British Empire in the 1996 New Year Honours, he retired from the army on 4 April 1996.

== Archaeology ==
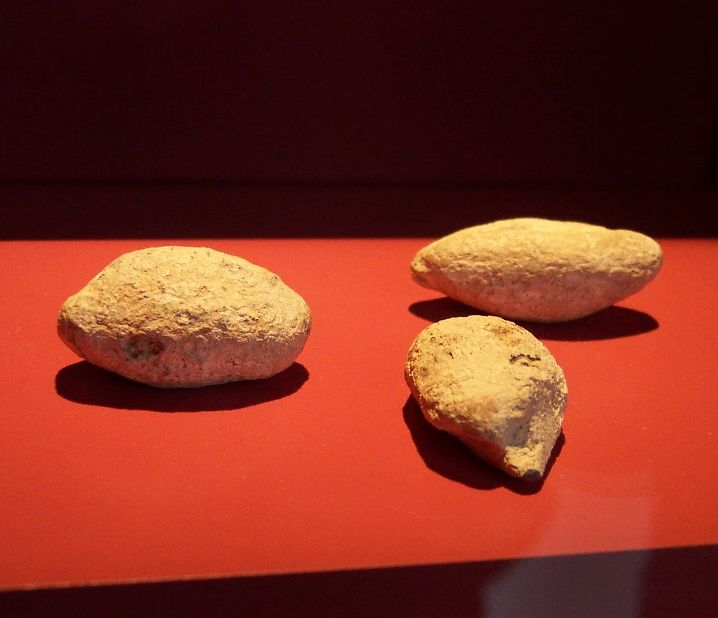
Roman sling shot found by Major Tony Clunn in Summer 1988.

Clunn searched for Roman coins with a metal detector as a hobby. In 1987, when he was attached to the Royal Tank Regiment in Osnabrück, he asked Wolfgang Schlüter, at the time the archaeologist for the District of Osnabrück, where he should look. He was advised to search 20 km north of the city, where Roman coins had previously been found, though none for 18 years.

Schlüter's recommendation was based upon a study of maps and the 19th-century historian Theodor Mommsen's proposal that the Kalkriese area was a likely location of the battle which took place in 9 C.E. On his first day, Clunn found several coins from the reign of Augustus, mostly in excellent condition. No coins found at the site post-date 9 C.E. He also discovered Roman sling shot in the vicinity of Kalkriese, the first indisputable evidence of military activity there. Previously there had been many conflicting theories about the location of the battle, and scholars had searched for it without success for 600 years.

On the basis of Clunn's findings, Schlüter began a comprehensive excavation of the site in 1989, later directed by Susanne Wilbers-Rost. His finds are now displayed at the Varusschlacht (Varus Battle) Museum and Park Kalkriese, opened in 2002. In the following years, Clunn investigated the entire area around Kalkriese. The coins he discovered have made it possible to reconstruct the route taken by the Roman legionaries under Varus and to determine where they were ambushed and massacred. In Clunn's opinion, the march route corresponds exactly to the changing environment as described by Dio Cassius.

== Retirement ==
Clunn returned to Osnabrück to live. He was awarded the Cross of the Federal Republic of Germany. He died on 3 August 2014 at his home in Bissendorf.

== Publications ==
- Tony Clunn. Ed. Anna Cheeseman-Clunn and Ursula Cheeseman. In Quest of the Lost Legions: The Varusschlacht. London: Minerva, 1999. ISBN 0-7541-1068-0
- Tony Clunn. The Quest for the Lost Roman Legions. Spellmount: Savas Beatie, 2005. ISBN 978-0-9544190-0-4

== Sources ==
- The Lost Legions of Varus. Television movie. Secret History Series 9. Granada Television, 2001. ImdB
- Wolfgang Schlüter. "Kalkriese: Ort der Varusschlacht. Die Ausgrabungen in der Kalkrieser-Niederwedder Senke". Archäologische Mitteilungen aus Nordwestdeutschland Beiheft 9 (1994). (in German)
