= Battle of the Teutoburg Forest =

Roman defeat by Germanic tribes in 9 AD

- Part of the Roman campaigns in Germania (12 BC – AD 16)
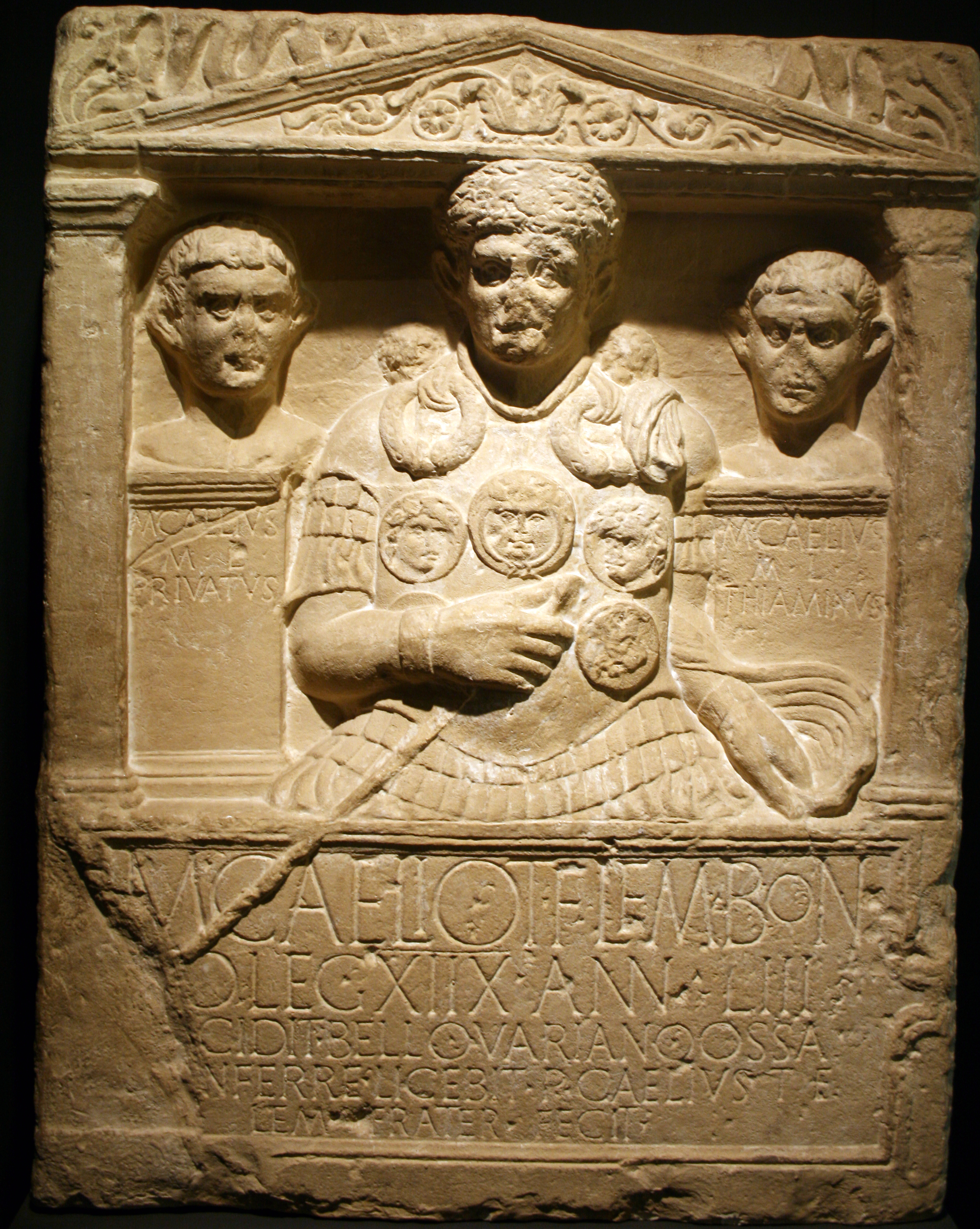
- Cenotaph of Marcus Caelius, 1st centurion of XVIII, who "fell in the war of Varus" (bello Variano).
Date	8–11 September 9 AD
Location	Likely present-day Kalkriese, Lower Saxony 52.408°N 8.129°E
Result	Germanic victory

Belligerents
Allied Germanic peoples, possibly including: Angrivarii; Bructeri; Chatti; Cherusci; Marsi; Sugambri; Usipetes	Roman Empire

Commanders and leaders
Arminius	Publius Varus ‡‡

Units involved
Unknown	Legio XVII; Legio XVIII; Legio XIX; 6 auxiliar cohorts; 3 cavalry squadrons

Strength
18,000‍–‍30,000: Angrivarii: 5,000; Bructeri: 8,000; Cherusci: 8,000; Remainder likely from the remaining tribes	Estimates vary: Powell 14,000–22,752 Unknown non-combatants McNally 21,000 total

Casualties and losses
Unknown	16,000–20,000 killed (Note: Effectively the entire army destroyed, some survivors may have been sold into slavery, a small number of Roman soldiers escaped back to Roman territory)

The Battle of the Teutoburg Forest, also called the Varian Disaster (Latin: Clades Variana) by Roman historians, was a major battle fought between an alliance of Germanic peoples and the Roman Empire between 8 and 11 September 9 AD, possibly near modern Kalkriese. Fighting began with an ambush by the Germanic alliance on three Roman legions being led by Publius Quinctilius Varus and their auxiliaries; the alliance was led by Arminius, a Germanic chieftain and officer of Varus's auxilia. Arminius had received Roman citizenship and a Roman military education, thus allowing him to deceive the Romans methodically and anticipate their tactical responses.

Teutoburg Forest is considered one of the most important defeats in Roman history, bringing the triumphant period of expansion under Augustus to an abrupt end. It dissuaded the Romans from pursuing the conquest of Germania, and so can be considered one of the most important events in European history.

The provinces of Germania Superior and Germania Inferior, sometimes collectively referred to as Roman Germania, were established in northeast Roman Gaul, while territories beyond the Rhine remained independent. Retaliatory campaigns were commanded by Tiberius and Germanicus and enjoyed success, but the Rhine became the border between the Roman Empire and the rest of Germania. Rome then made no major incursion into Germania until Marcus Aurelius (r. 161–180) during the Marcomannic Wars.

Some of the descendants of the vassal kingdoms, like the Suebi (by suzerainty), that Augustus tried to create in Germania to expand the romanitas and the Empire, were the ones that invaded Rome in the fourth and fifth centuries.

== Background ==
=== Geopolitical situation ===
Map showing the defeat of Publius Quinctilius Varus at Kalkriese

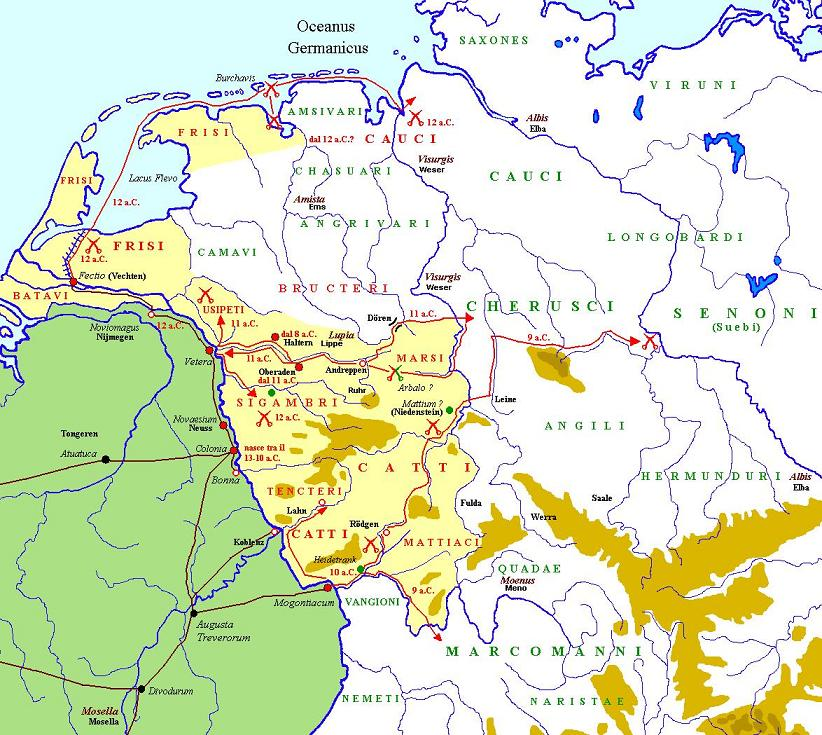
Invasions of Drusus I in 12–8 BCE

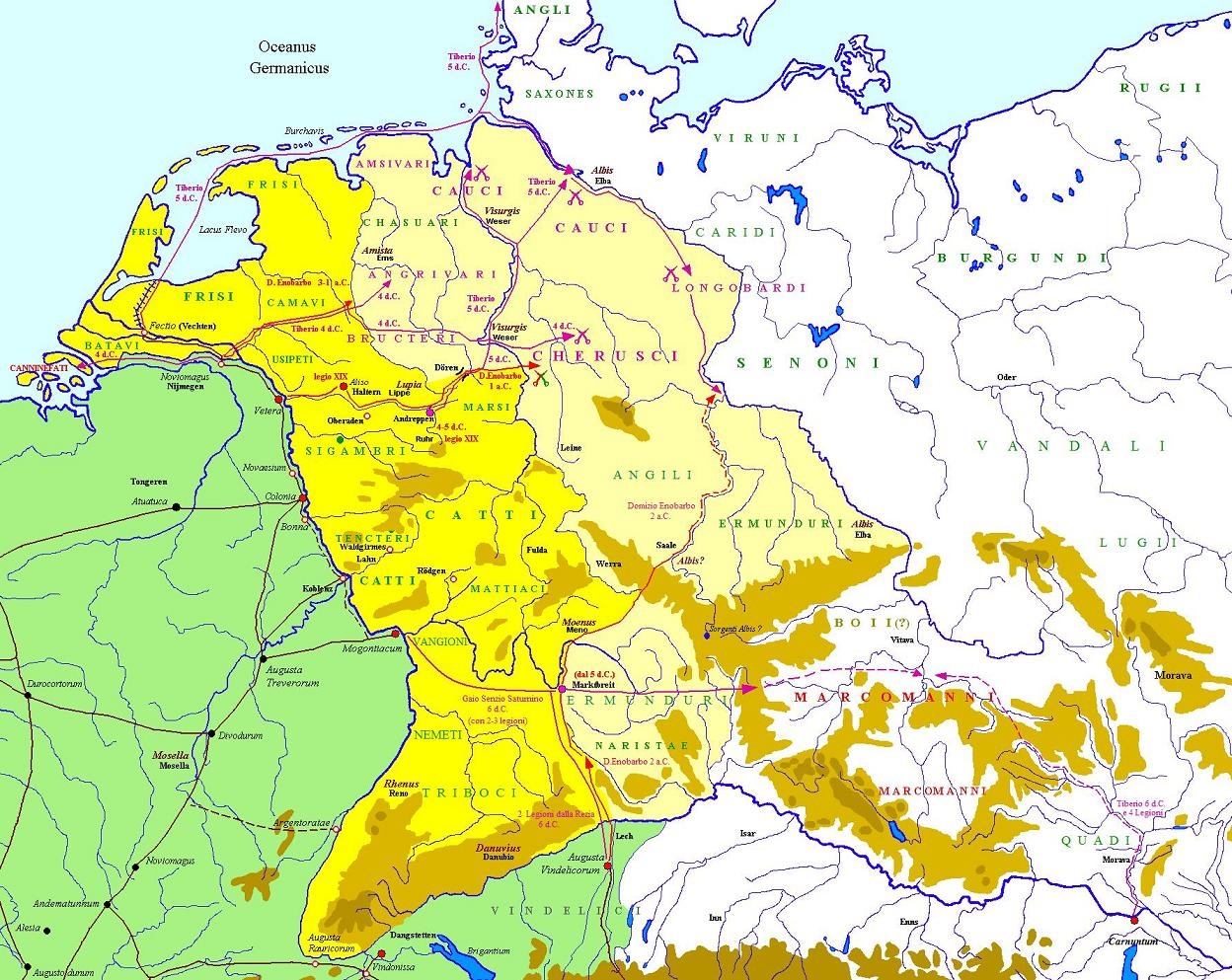
Invasions of Tiberius and Lucius Domitius Ahenobarbus in c. 3 BC – AD 6

The Roman Republic expanded rapidly in the first century BCE, most notably under Julius Caesar, who conquered most of western Europe and parts of the British Isles in the Gallic Wars (58–50 BCE). These mostly were against the Gauls but also included battles with various Germanic tribes. Caesar twice crossed the River Rhine but the engagements were inconclusive. His conquests ended as Caesar's civil war (49–45 BCE) drew near.

Continental Europe was mostly neglected by Rome for the next two decades, as power struggles wracked the Republic. Troops previously garrisoned in Gaul were pulled out in 31 BCE for the showdown between Octavian and Mark Antony at the Battle of Actium. The Gauls promptly rebelled, and Roman control was not regained until 28 BCE.

27 BCE saw drastic change for both Gaul and Rome as a whole. The Roman Republic reorganised into the Roman Empire, with Octavian as the first emperor. Octavian, now styled Augustus, aimed at solidifying control of Gaul by dividing the region into three smaller provinces that emphasised the strategic importance of the Rhine valley. Troops were kept near the Rhine, though policy towards the Germanic lands remains unclear. Two main theories exist. The first is that Augustus simply sought to cement the Rhine as the Northern border of the Empire; the second that the border was far more fluid, and that the troops were more focused on maintaining order in the Empire than on preventing Germanic intrusion. The Germans operated with apparent impunity anyway, as exemplified by the crushing defeat in the Lollian disaster in 16 BCE.

The Lollian disaster prompted a reorganisation of the legions in Gaul, which was completed by 12 BCE, when Emperor Augustus sought finally to tame the Germanic tribes. He began by making his stepson Drusus I governor of Gaul. Drusus campaigned against the Germans from 11–9 BCE, earning a series of victories, despite considerable obstacles, before his untimely death in a riding accident in 9 BCE. His elder brother and future emperor Tiberius was given command of Germany in 8 BCE. Tiberius continued his brother's campaign against the Sugambri, extending de facto, if not de jure Roman rule, but he fell out of political favour and chose exile in 6 BCE. He was, in turn, succeeded by Lucius Domitius Ahenobarbus, who had been consul in 16 BCE. Ahenobarbus suppressed a number of local uprisings and then crossed the Elbe river, the first and last Roman general to do so. As the turn of the century approached, the Romans felt secure about Germany, reassured by thriving cross-border trade and relative peace.

In early CE 6, Legatus Gaius Sentius Saturninus and Consul Legatus Marcus Aemilius Lepidus led a massive army of 13 legions and their entourage, totaling around 100,000 men (65,000 heavy infantry legionaries, 10,000–20,000 cavalrymen, archers, and 10,000–20,000 civilians) against Maroboduus, the king of the Marcomanni, who were a tribe of the Suebi. (Note: Following their defeat at the hands of Drusus I in 9 BC, the Marcomanni had fled into the territory of the Boii, from which they formed an alliance with the Hermunduri, Quadi, Semnones, Lugians, Zumi, Butones, Mugilones, Sibini, and Langobards.)

However, Tiberius was then forced to turn his attention to the Bellum Batonianum, also known as the Great Illyrian Revolt, which broke out in the Balkan province of Illyricum. Led by Bato the Daesitiate, Bato the Breucian, Pinnes of Pannonia, and elements of the Marcomanni, it lasted nearly four years. Tiberius had to stop his campaign against Maroboduus and recognise him as king so that he could then send eight legions to crush the rebellion in the Balkans.

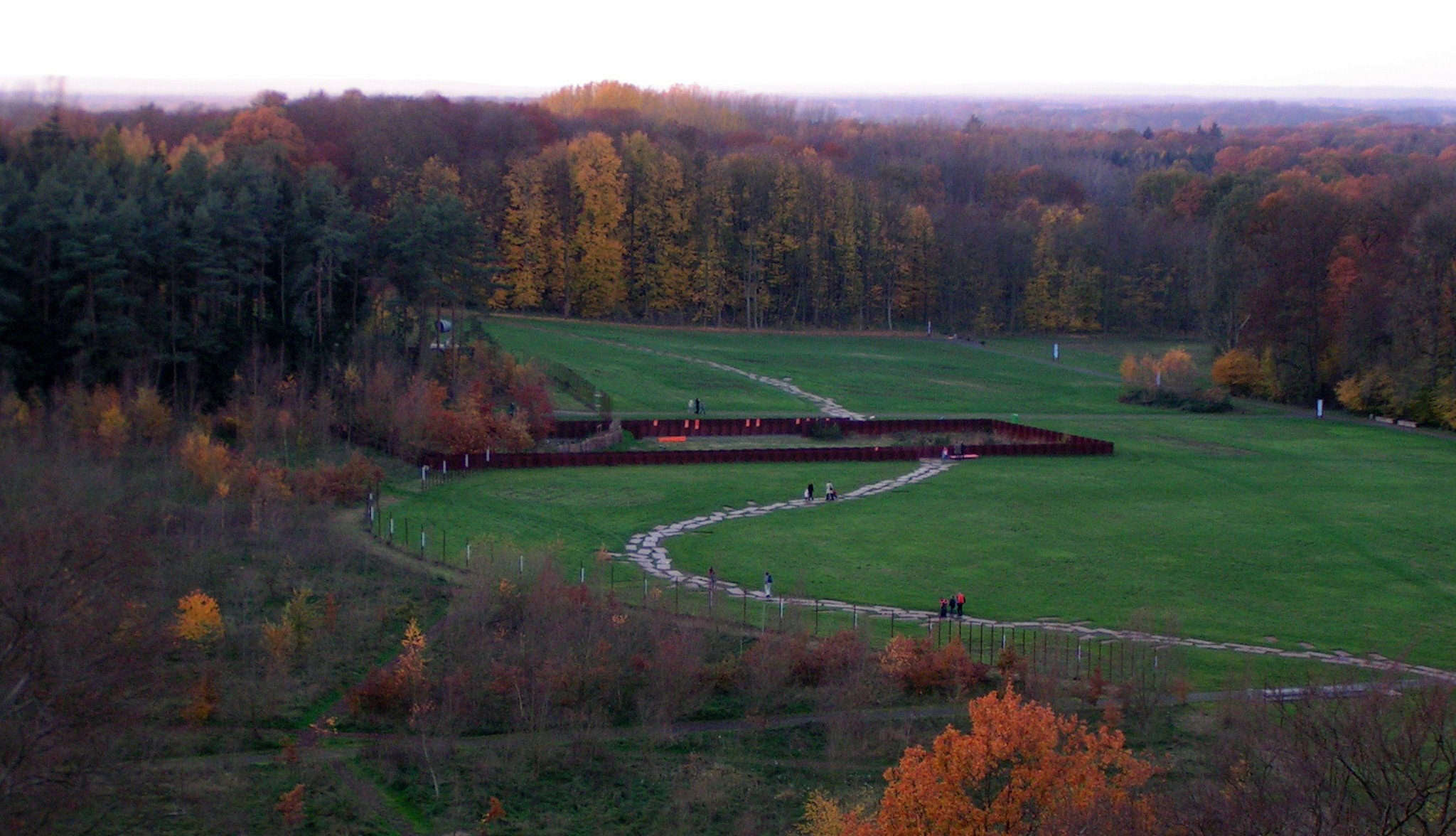
Modern Kalkriese, likely site of the battle

Following Rome's transfer of forces to the Balkans, only three legions remained to face the Germanic tribesmen. The weakened Roman position provided an opportunity for a Germanic rebellion.

== Commanders and their armies ==
=== Publius Quinctilius Varus ===
The Varian disaster takes its name from Publius Quinctilius Varus, the commander of the remaining Roman forces in the region. Varus was a promising leader; Emperor Augustus appointed him quaestor in 22 BCE as a young man, even though the office usually required the holder to be at least 30. He went on to command the XIX legion in 15 BCE, and was elected junior consul. He was appointed governor of Africa in 8 BCE and of Syria in 7 BCE. The Syrian posting was prestigious, and a very difficult job due to political struggles in the Eastern Empire and its border nations. Varus acted to resolve the succession crisis at the death of Herod the Great in 4 BCE, but his performance as governor is disputed by contemporary sources. Josephus (writing some decades after the fact) has a positive view of Varus, whereas Velleius Paterculus implicitly accuses him of corruption. Regardless, Varus married the Emperor's great-niece after his term as governor ended, which ensured him a place in the Emperor's inner circle. Varus likely remained with the Emperor in Rome until his appointment to the command in Germania in 7 CE. Michael McNally assesses that Varus was not assigned to Germania for his military abilities, but for his political acumen; this was likely sought by the Emperor to deal with the factionalism among Germanic tribes.

Varus's name and deeds were known beyond the empire because of his ruthlessness, including crucifixion of insurgents. While he was feared by the people, he was highly respected by the Roman Senate. On the Rhine, he was in command of the XVII, XVIII, and XIX legions. These had previously been led by General Gaius Sentius Saturninus, who had been sent back to Rome after being awarded the ornamenta triumphalia. The other two legions in the winter-quarters of the army at castrum Moguntiacum were led by Varus' nephew, Lucius Nonius Asprenas, and perhaps Lucius Arruntius.

Varus initially commanded five legions plus auxiliaries in Germania. In the early imperial period, each legion at full strength had 4,800 men supported by 120 light escort/scouting cavalry. Combined usually with a group of engineers and officers, a legion was roughly 5,000 fighting men. This did not include the 1,200 non-combatant servants who were integrated into the legion. Varus's initial command of about 25,000 (not counting auxiliaries) represented some 20% of the Roman frontline army. But it is unclear how many men were truly under his command at the Battle of the Teutoburg Forest; estimates generally range from 20,000 to 30,000. Of his five starting legions, only three were under his command at the battle (~15,000 men), supported by nine small auxiliary units (~4,500 men). Winter attrition due to casualties, illness, and other causes would have sapped the legions' strength. The Roman historian Cassius Dio assumed that a large number of civilians were part of the camp following. But McNally finds this unlikely. Recent reforms had required that legionaries be unmarried, which meant that families were no longer part of the camp following. McNally puts the likely number of civilians at a few hundred, mostly merchants who followed the army. Assuming 10% winter attrition, and an auxiliary force of about 4,000 after attrition, McNally comes up with 17,000 combatants, supported by roughly 3,800 servant non-combatants. Combined with the civilians, the army would have numbered about 21,000 at the start of campaigning, but was probably smaller by the time of the battle, as further attrition combined with the need to detach garrisons along the way would have sapped the army's strength.

The main Roman army was highly professional and outfitted by the state. They were given standardised weapons and armour, consisting of a gladius (shortsword), a large shield, a pilum (javelin), a helmet, a mail shirt, and some segmented armour. The auxiliary units were not outfitted by the Romans, and instead would have represented the equipment and fighting styles of their homelands, which put them much on par with the Germanic troops.

=== Arminius ===
The Germanic coalition was led by Arminius, of the Cherusci tribe. Arminius was in a strong position to understand Roman tactics and strategy: though he was born in Germania, he had been taken hostage by the Romans after Drusus defeated the tribe in combat in 8 BCE, when Arminius would have been about 10 years old. He received an aristocratic education in Rome, as he was the son of a nobleman—even if he was still a hostage. When he came of age, he joined the ordo equester (the Roman cavalry), which would later lead to his appointment as a commander of Roman auxiliaries. By 4 CE, he was serving in Pannonia (in the northwestern Balkan states). Soon after, he returned to his homeland in Germania, still nominally loyal to Rome.

McNally suggests that two important events shaped Arminius's view of the Romans: an ambush in 11 BCE led by the Cherusci against Drusus, and Drusus' victory over the Cherusci in 8 BCE. In the ambush in 11 BCE, the Cherusci had trapped Drusus' army in unfavourable terrain, and the Romans escaped only with great difficulty. Drusus' victory in 8 BCE would have been unforgettable to Arminius, who had been made a hostage because of it. From these events, McNally argues that Arminius surmised a key lesson: "the Romans could be defeated, but only in a situation where their tactical flexibility and discipline could not be brought to bear."

The size of Arminius's forces is a guessing game at best since no written records of the Germanic peoples survive. Estimates thus vary widely based on the starting assumptions. Historian Adrian Murdoch suggests a force of 25,000. Historian Peter Wells suggests that the army may have pulled from a large area, and gives a range of estimates between 17,000 and 100,000, but suggests that 18,000 were probably involved at the final stage of the battle when the Romans were routed. McNally finds fault with Wells's demographic calculation style, finding his upper estimate of 100,000 to be very unlikely. Historian Hans Delbrück suggested that each tribe involved probably had 6,000 to 8,000 fighting men, for a total in the 20,000 to 30,000 range.

Delbrück notes that these troops were not just mere farmers; they were experienced soldiers in their own right, even if not outfitted by the state as the Romans were. But the Germanic army was, with the exception of armor, generally as well equipped as the Romans. Most had no armour and would have been limited to a simple shield and a hunting spear or axe. There was a gradation in equipment quality according to the wealth and status of the fighter. Those fighters who held command roles or been part of a chief's guard would have carried a heavy spear and a number of javelins, along with various other secondary weapons, as well as high-quality shields. Still, armour was very rare and would have been acquired as spoils of war from defeated Romans, or perhaps from time serving as a Roman auxiliary.

After his return from Rome to Gaul, Arminius became a trusted advisor to Varus, even as he secretly constructed an alliance of Germanic peoples that had traditionally been enemies. These probably included the Cherusci, Marsi, Chatti, and Bructeri, out of the roughly fifty Germanic tribes at the time. Using the collective outrage over Varus' tyranny, insolence and cruelty to the conquered, Arminius was able to unite the disorganised groups who had submitted to Rome, and maintain the alliance until the most opportune moment to strike.

== Lead-up to battle ==
=== A simple Roman campaign ===
Ancient battles were constrained by the seasons and weather. Typically, the campaigning season began in March, and ended by October, at which point armies would return to winter camps. Over the winter of 8 to 9 CE, Varus planned a simple campaign for the coming year. The disparate elements of the army would meet at Vetera (modern day Xanten, Germany), cross the Rhine, march to Cherusci territory while resupplying garrisons on the way, and then set up a summer camp in nominally pacified Cherusci lands from which to base summer operations.

But unbeknownst to Varus, he had already been betrayed. The idea of setting up a summer camp in Cherusci lands was a ploy by Arminius, who was still Varus's trusted confidant. By being in the homeland of Arminius, the Cherusci could carefully observe the Romans during the summer, and the Romans would have to make a longer trek back to their winter headquarters. Then, while on the long march back, the Romans could be ambushed in terrain favourable to Arminius. It is unknown as to when Arminius decided to plan an attack against Rome and its forces; it could have occurred during his time as a youth during his "Romanisation" as a hostage, or even as late as his service in Germania under Varus. Regardless, his mind was made up by early 9 CE when he began deceiving Varus and recruiting Germanic leaders and warriors to his cause. It is doubtful that Arminius imagined he would strike a total victory against the Romans, and thus he had to build a coalition of tribes together in order to wage what could have been a protracted war.

=== Summer operations ===
The Roman army moved out of winter camps sometime in March, and followed Varus's plan. Logistical challenges beset the army and security was lax. The location of the summer camp is unknown, but probably near or at what is now Minden, Germany. Historical sources suggest that Varus waged little to no military action that summer, and instead focused on holding court and dealing with the Germanic tribes in a political and legal sense. McNally finds the accounts to be unreliable on some points, noting that the only contemporary chronicler who describes the summer was Paterculus, and that Paterculus had reason to dislike Varus. Other accounts in turn relied on Paterculus's account, and thus had Paterculus's bias. At any rate, the summer was probably typical for the troops, whose time would have been spent drilling or engaging in civil engineering projects such as strengthening local roads and fortifications.

The summer proved to be crucial for Arminius, who along with his auxiliaries, was attached to the main Roman army. He bided his time during the early part of the summer, but the clock was running out, and he still needed to orchestrate an ambush. Thus in July, he ordered some of his allies to start raiding the Romans. Then, he counselled Varus to split off a detachment of troops to go put down unrest. Varus acceded, thereby splitting his own forces. Arminius further arranged for his own Cherusci auxiliaries to find Roman work parties, approach them as if nothing was unusual, and then betray the Romans while in their midst. McNally chastises Varus for not improving security or otherwise realising that a larger plan was afoot.

Arminius's carefully laid plans nearly unravelled when his father-in-law, Segestes, informed Varus of Arminius's treachery. But Varus disbelieved this report, perhaps because Segestes had not approved of the marriage of his daughter and thus bore a grudge against Arminius.

=== Varus's choice ===
As late summer arrived, escalating unrest became the chief concern. While Varus was on his way from his summer camp west of the River Weser to winter quarters near the Rhine, he heard reports of a local rebellion; these had been fabricated by Arminius. Edward Shepherd Creasy writes that "This was represented to Varus as an occasion which required his prompt attendance on the spot; but he was kept in studied ignorance of its being part of a concerted national rising; and he still looked on Arminius as his submissive vassal".

Other counsellors to Varus advised that there was not enough time left in the season to put down unrest and also make it back to winter camp. An early Roman retreat back to camp would have foiled Arminius's plans, as the Romans would not only leave before the Germanic troops could be marshalled, but the Romans would also retreat along the same well-guarded path they had come in on. In a desperate gamble, Arminius suggested that, instead of retracing the army's path, they could achieve both goals if they went on campaign against the Angrivarii. By going through Angrivarii territory, the route back would be shorter, and the Romans would also be able to put down the revolt. The otherwise boring summer may have increased Varus's willingness to engage in action, and he chose to follow Arminius's plan.

On the morning of 7 September 9 CE, the Roman army mustered to move out. The muster was combined with the third payday of the year, which resulted in large numbers of coins being distributed to the army. The high density of coins would, some two thousand years later, serve as an archaeological marker of the battle site. The morale of the troops was boosted by word that high command authorised looting on the Angrivarii campaign, given that the army would be operating beyond supply lines.

That evening, Arminius told Varus that he was breaking off to finish the muster of the Cheruscii auxiliaries, but would return with the main army in two or three days. It was the men's final meeting. Arminius left behind a small number of Cheruscii, nominally to act as guides, but their true purpose was to act as spies. The loss of Arminius cut the size of the Roman army by a quarter and deeply curtailed its scouting abilities. Arminius himself hurriedly rode northward to gather the troops of the Angrivarii and Bructeri.

== Battle ==
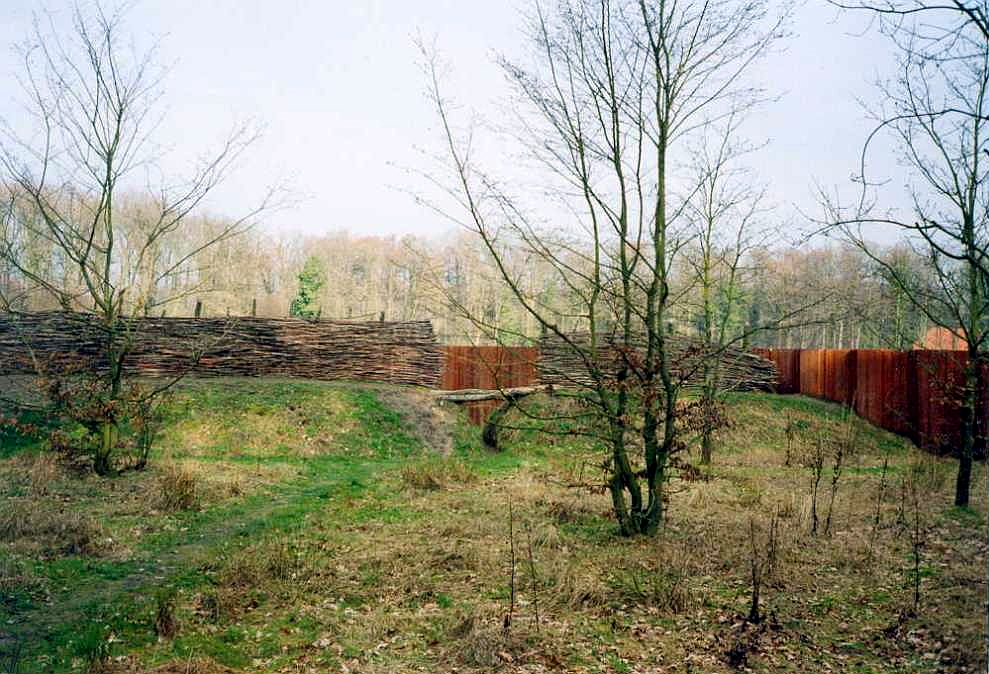
Reconstruction of the improvised fortifications prepared by the Germanic coalition for the final phase of the Varus battle near Kalkriese

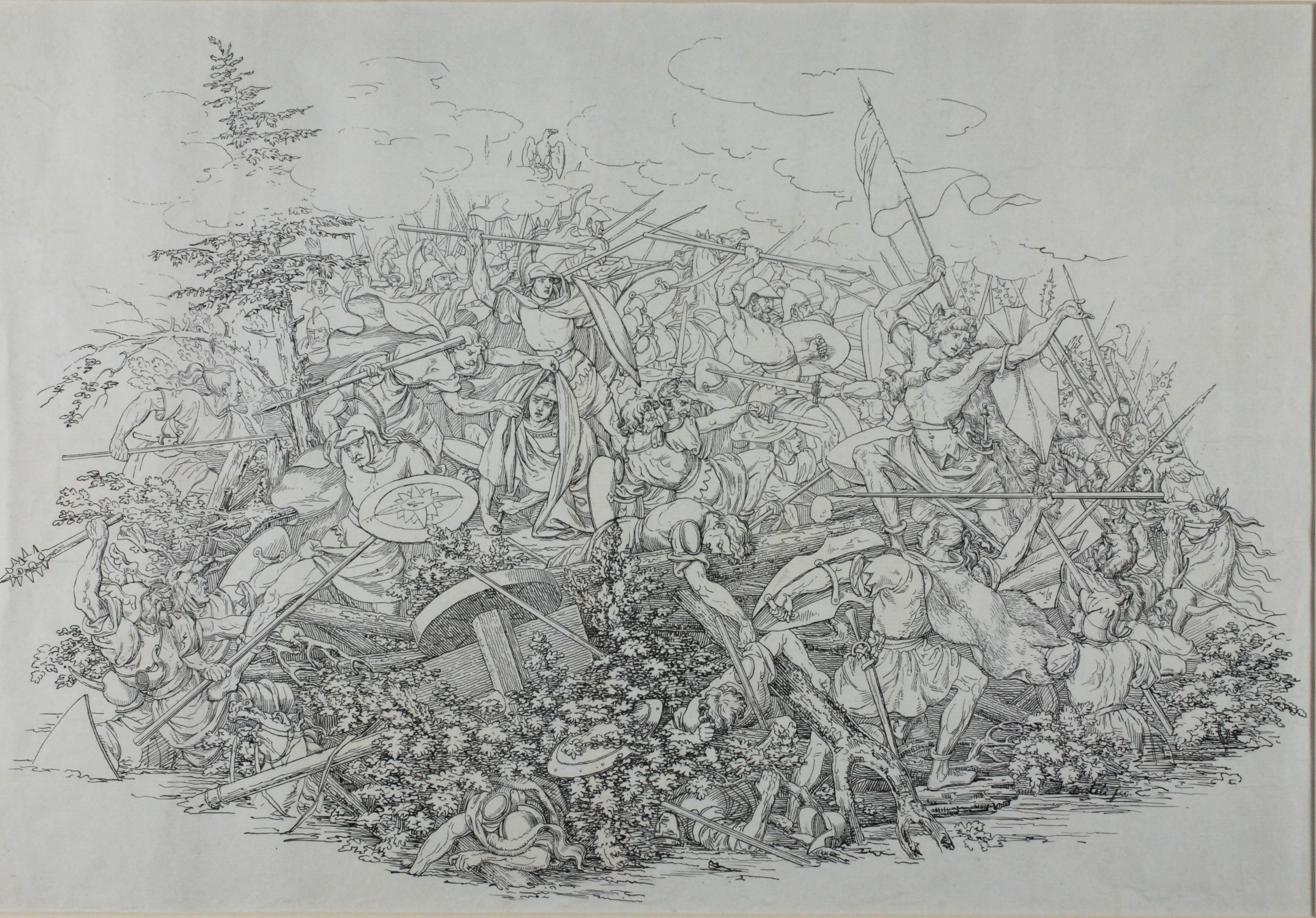
Martin Disteli's 1830s lithograph of Varus falling on his sword during the Battle of Teutoburg Forest

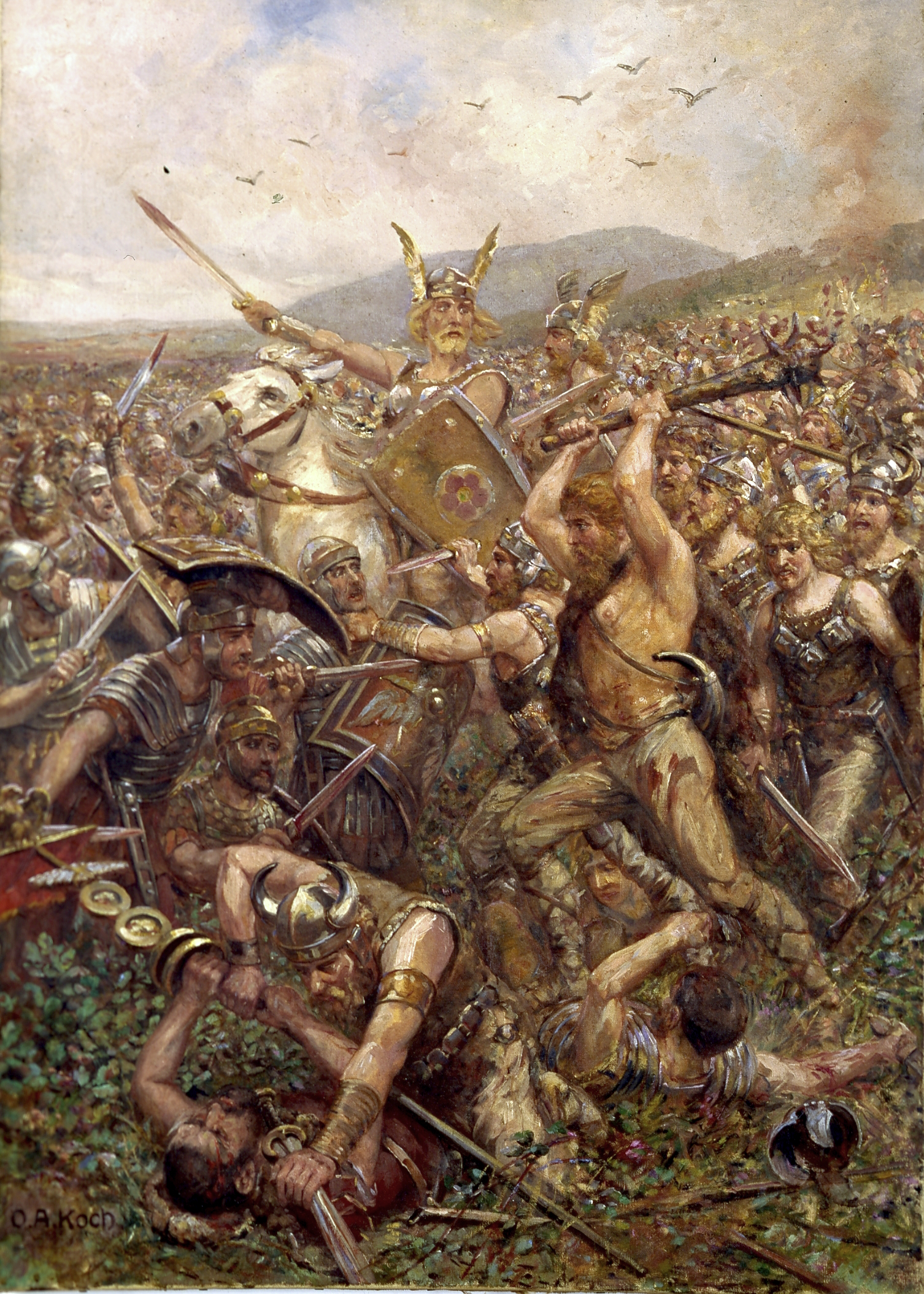
Germanic warriors storm the field, Varusschlacht, 1909

On the morning of 8 September, the Roman army decamped and continued snaking its way through the area's thick forest, which slowed movement and strung the army out at an increasing distance. Arminius now only had to ensure that the Romans worked their way towards Kalkriese, where the Angrivarii lay in ambush. To that end, his Bructerii allies attacked the Roman army along its length in the late morning.

At the time of attack, the line of march was stretched out perilously long—between 15 and 20 kilometres (9.3 and 12.4 mi). Germanic warriors attacked along the line, armed with swords, large lances and narrow-bladed short spears called fremae. The attackers surrounded the entire Roman army and rained down javelins on the intruders. It was a brief skirmish, aimed at tiring out the Roman troops and causing maximum damage to their supplies. The Bructerii withdrew quickly, likely taking the Cheruscii spies embedded in the Roman army with them.

The Romans' luck went from bad to worse as a torrential downpour began. Unable to advance, Varus ordered the army to make camp. A sturdy camp was erected, and Varus called a war council. Casualty reports indicated only light losses, but the baggage trains and scout cavalry were shown to be particularly vulnerable.

The Romans undertook a night march to escape, but marched into another trap that Arminius had set at the foot of Kalkriese Hill. There, a sandy, open strip on which the Romans could march was constricted by the hill, so that there was a gap of only about 100 metres (330 ft) between the woods and the swampland at the edge of the Great Bog. The road was further blocked by a trench and, towards the forest, an earthen wall had been built along the roadside, permitting the Germanic alliance to attack the Romans from cover. The Romans made a desperate attempt to storm the wall, but failed, and the highest-ranking officer next to Varus, Legatus Numonius Vala, abandoned the troops by riding off with the cavalry. His retreat was in vain, however, as he was overtaken by the Germanic cavalry and killed shortly thereafter, according to Velleius Paterculus. The Germanic warriors then stormed the field and slaughtered the disintegrating Roman forces. Varus committed suicide, and Velleius reports that one commander, Praefectus Ceionius, surrendered, then later took his own life, while his colleague Praefectus Eggius died leading his doomed troops.

Roman casualties have been estimated at 15,000–20,000 dead, and many of the officers were said to have taken their own lives by falling on their swords in the approved manner. Tacitus wrote that many officers were sacrificed by the Germanic forces as part of their indigenous religious ceremonies, cooked in pots and their bones used for rituals. Others were ransomed and some common soldiers appear to have been enslaved.

All Roman accounts stress the completeness of the Roman defeat, and the finds at Kalkriese of 6,000 pieces of Roman equipment, but only a single item that is clearly Germanic (part of a spur), suggest few Germanic losses. However, the victors would most likely have removed the bodies of their fallen and their practice of burying their warriors' battle gear with them may explain the lack of Germanic relics. Additionally, as many as several thousand Germanic soldiers were deserting militiamen and wore Roman armour, and thus would appear to be "Roman" in the archaeological digs. It is known, too, that the Germanic peoples wore perishable organic material, such as leather, and less metal than the Roman legionaries.

The victory was followed by a clean sweep of all Roman forts, garrisons and cities (of which there were at least two) east of the Rhine; the two Roman legions remaining in Germania, commanded by Varus' nephew Lucius Nonius Asprenas, simply tried to hold the Rhine. One fort, Aliso, most likely located in today's Haltern am See, fended off the Germanic alliance for many weeks, perhaps even a few months. After the situation became untenable, the garrison under Lucius Caedicius, accompanied by survivors of Teutoburg Forest, broke through the siege and reached the Rhine. They had resisted long enough for Nonius Asprenas to have organised the Roman defence on the Rhine with two legions and Tiberius to have arrived with a new army, together preventing Arminius from crossing the Rhine and invading Gaul.

== Aftermath ==
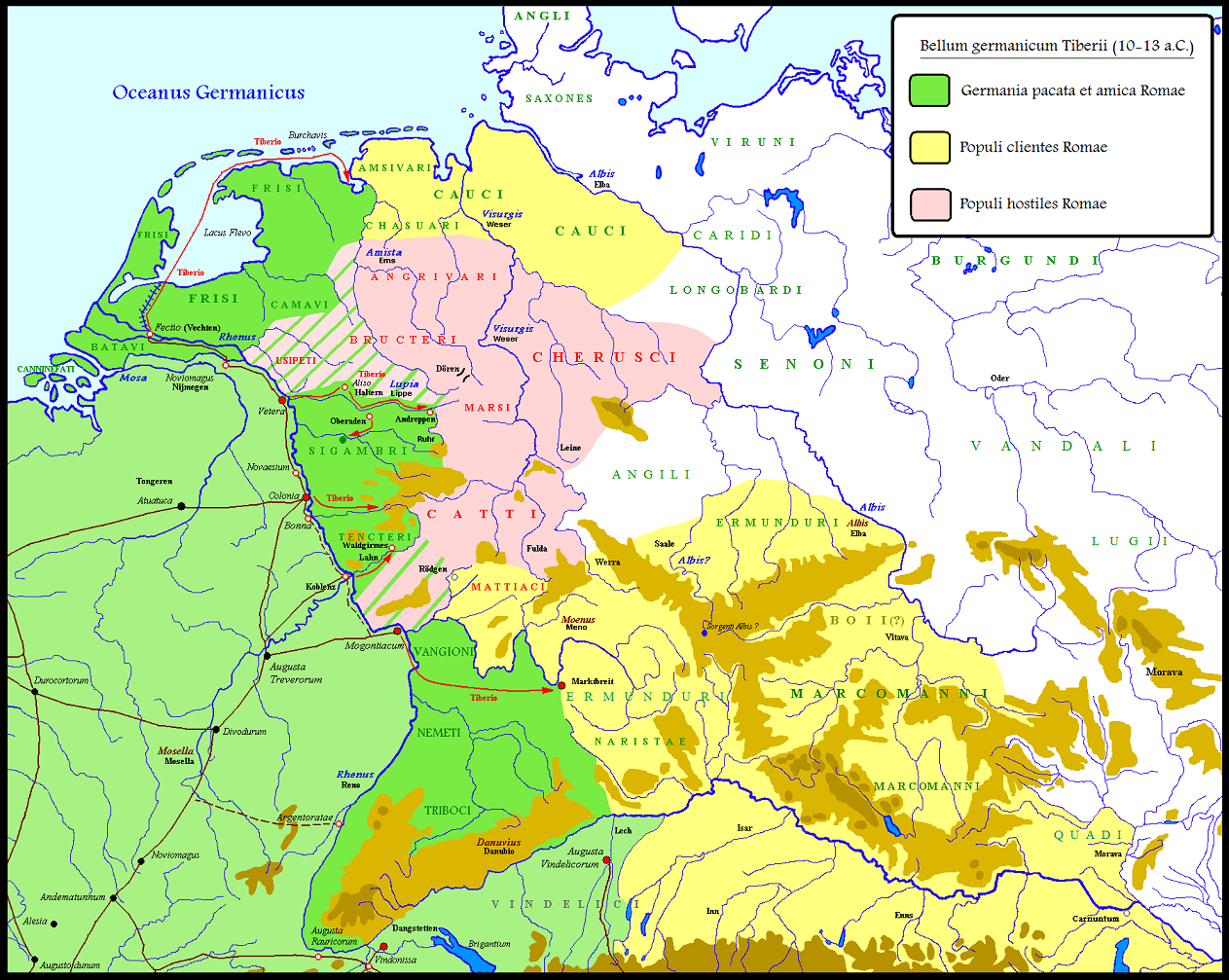
Political situation in Germania after the Battle of the Teutoburg Forest. In pink, the anti-Roman Germanic coalition led by Arminius; in dark green, territories still directly held by the Romans; in yellow, the Roman client states.

Upon hearing of the defeat, the Emperor Augustus, according to the Roman historian Suetonius in The Twelve Caesars, was so shaken that he stood butting his head against the walls of his palace, repeatedly shouting:

Quintili Vare, legiones redde! (Quintilius Varus, give me back my legions!)

The legion numbers XVII, XVIII and XIX were not used again by the Romans. This was in contrast to other legions that were reestablished after suffering defeat.

The battle abruptly ended the period of triumphant Roman expansion that followed the end of the Civil Wars forty years earlier. Augustus' stepson Tiberius took effective control, and prepared for the continuation of the war. Legio II Augusta, XX Valeria Victrix and XIII Gemina were sent to the Rhine to replace the lost legions.

Arminius sent Varus's severed head to Maroboduus, king of the Marcomanni, the other most powerful Germanic ruler, with the offer of an anti-Roman alliance. Maroboduus declined, sending the head to Rome for burial, and remained neutral throughout the ensuing war. Only thereafter did a brief, inconclusive war break out between the two Germanic leaders.

== Roman retaliation ==
=== Germanicus' campaign against the Germanic coalition ===
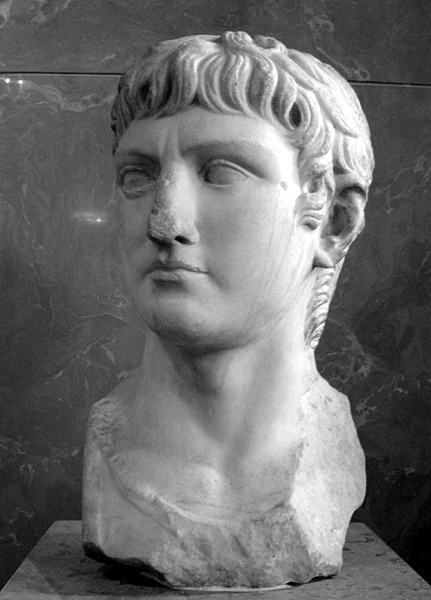
The Roman commander Germanicus was the opponent of Arminius in 14–16 AD

Though the shock at the slaughter was enormous, the Romans immediately began a slow, systematic process of preparing for the reconquest of the country. In 14 AD, just after Augustus' death and the accession of his heir and stepson Tiberius, a massive raid was conducted by the new emperor's nephew Germanicus. He attacked the Marsi with the element of surprise. The Bructeri, Tubanti and Usipeti were roused by the attack and ambushed Germanicus on the way to his winter quarters, but were defeated with heavy losses.

The next year was marked by two major campaigns and several smaller battles with a large army estimated at 55,000–70,000 men, backed by naval forces. In spring 15 AD, Legatus Caecina Severus invaded the Marsi a second time with about 25,000–30,000 men, causing great havoc. Meanwhile, Germanicus' troops had built a fort on Mount Taunus from where he marched with about 30,000–35,000 men against the Chatti. Many of the men fled across a river and dispersed themselves in the forests. Germanicus next marched on Mattium ("caput gentis", capital city) and burned it to the ground. After initial successful skirmishes in summer 15 AD, including the capture of Arminius' wife Thusnelda, the army visited the site of the first battle. According to Tacitus, they found heaps of bleached bones and severed skulls nailed to trees, which they buried, "...looking on all as kinsfolk and of their own blood...". At a location Tacitus calls the pontes longi ("long causeways"), in boggy lowlands somewhere near the Ems, Arminius' troops attacked the Romans. Arminius initially caught Germanicus' cavalry in a trap, inflicting heavy casualties, but the Roman infantry reinforced the rout and checked them. The fighting lasted for two days, with neither side achieving a decisive victory. Germanicus' forces withdrew and returned to the Rhine. (Note: Tacitus claims that the Romans won the battle at pontes longi; however, modern sources say the battle was inconclusive.)

Under Germanicus, the Romans marched another army, along with allied Germanic auxiliaries, into Germania in 16 AD. He forced a crossing of the Weser near modern Minden, suffering losses to a Germanic skirmishing force, and forced Arminius' army to stand in open battle at Idistaviso in the Battle of the Weser River. Germanicus' legions inflicted huge casualties on the Germanic armies. A final battle was fought at the Angrivarian Wall west of modern Hanover, repeating the pattern of high Germanic fatalities, which forced them to flee beyond the Elbe. Germanicus, having defeated the forces between the Rhine and the Elbe, then ordered Caius Silius to march against the Chatti with a mixed force of three thousand cavalry and thirty thousand infantry and lay waste to their territory, while Germanicus, with a larger army, invaded the Marsi for the third time and devastated their land, encountering no resistance.

With his main objectives reached and winter approaching, Germanicus ordered his army back to their winter camps, with the fleet incurring some damage from a storm in the North Sea. Afterwards, a few more raids across the Rhine resulted in the recovery of two of the three legions' eagles lost in 9 AD: one Legion Eagle was recovered from the Marsi in 14 AD; the Legion XIX Eagle was recovered from the Bructeri in 15 AD by troops under Lucius Stertinius. Tiberius ordered the Roman forces to halt and withdraw across the Rhine. Germanicus was recalled to Rome and informed by Tiberius that he would be given a triumph and reassigned to a new command.

Campaigns of Germanicus and A. Caecina Severus in 14–16 CE

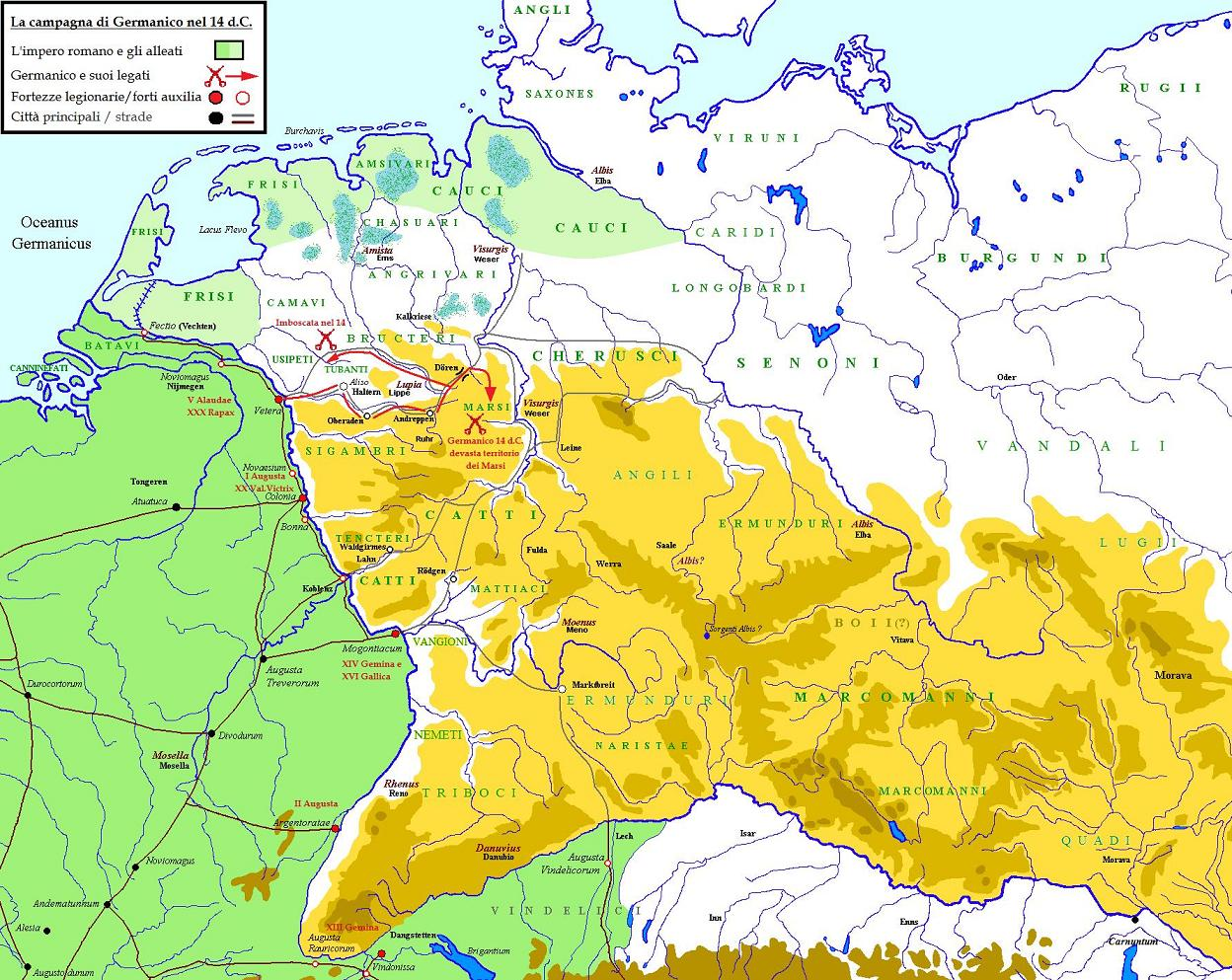
Military action in 14 CE

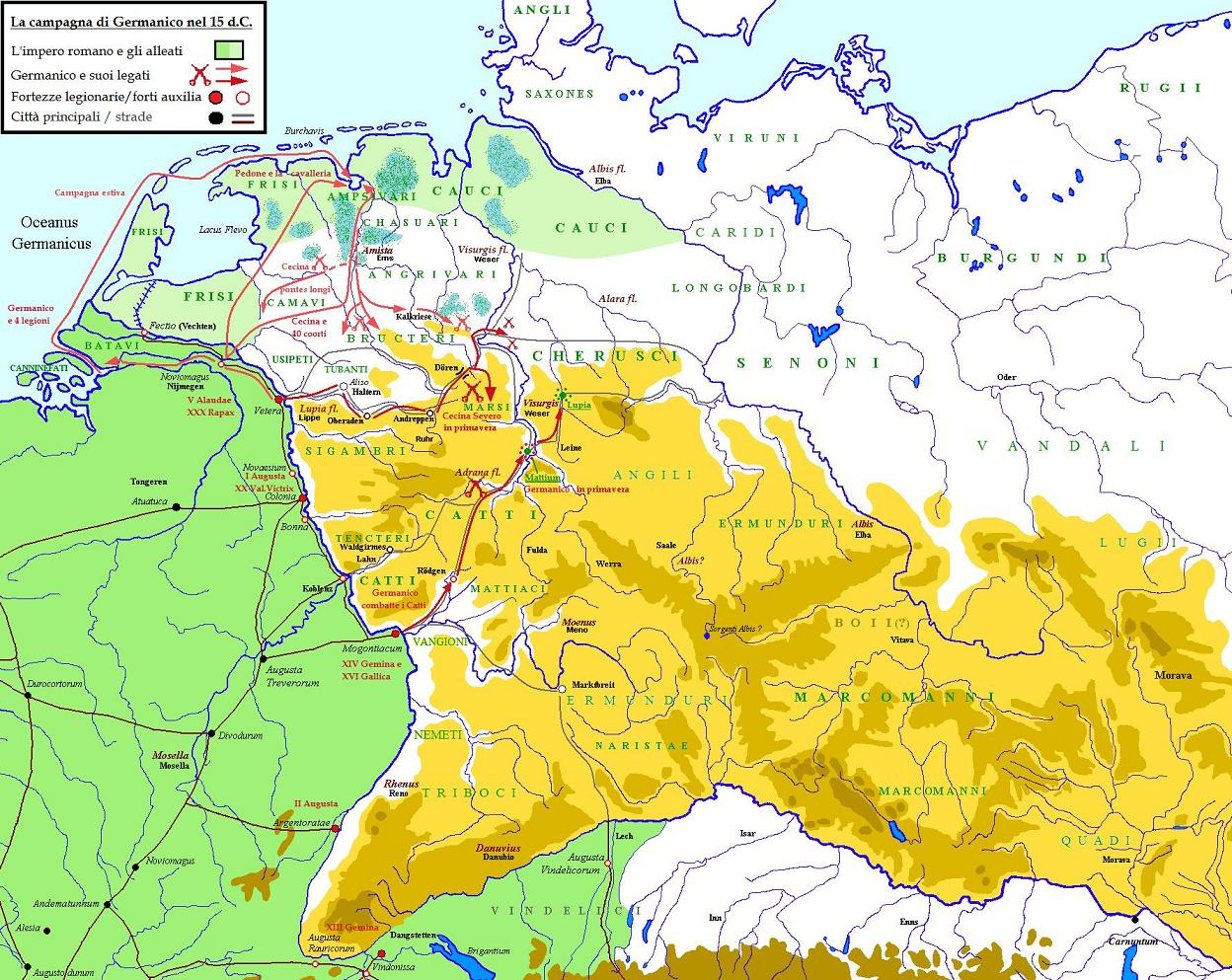
Campaigns in 15 CE

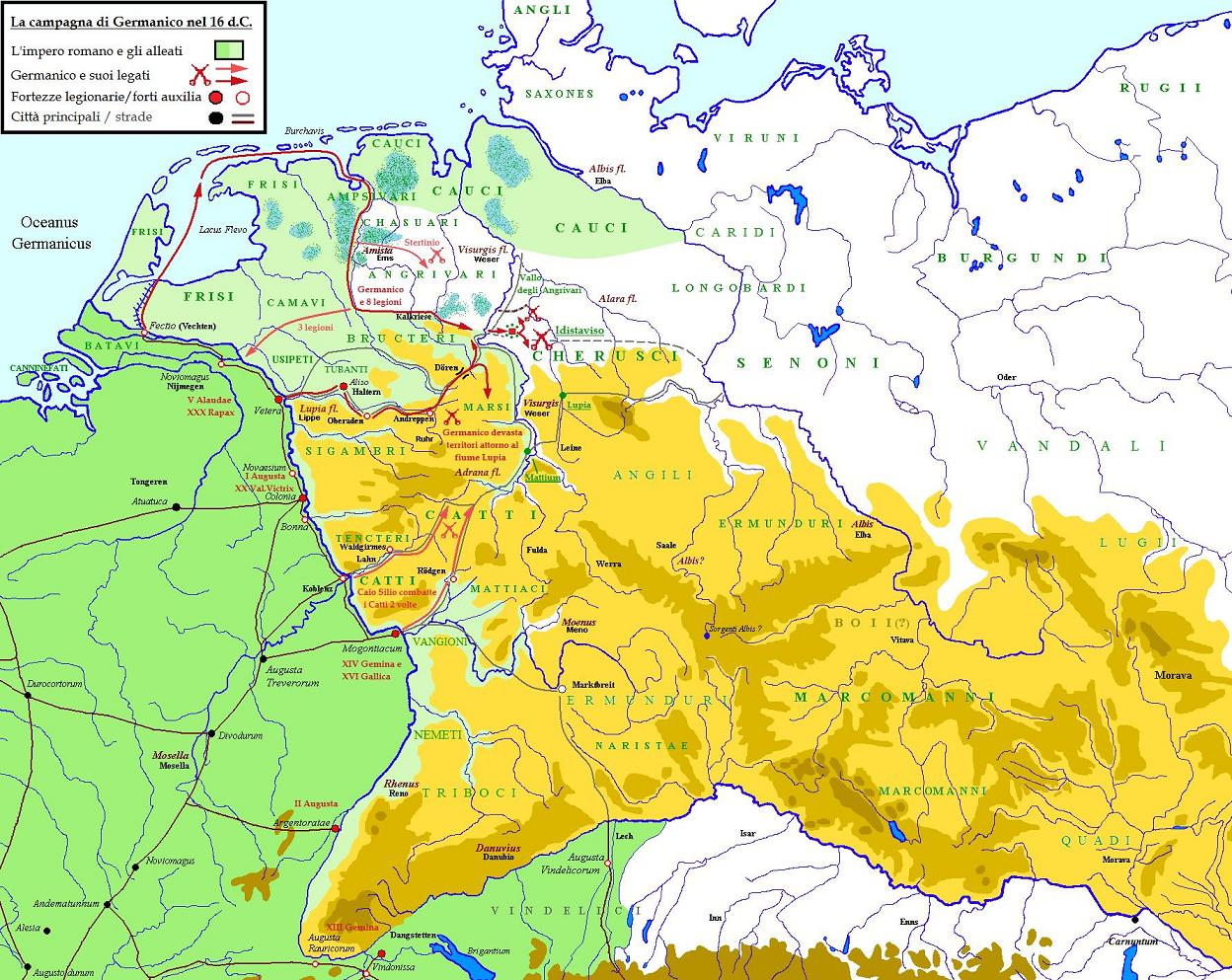
Operations in 16 CE

Germanicus' campaign had been taken to avenge the Teutoburg slaughter and also partially in reaction to indications of mutinous intent amongst his troops. Arminius, who had been considered a very real threat to stability by Rome, was now defeated. Once his Germanic coalition had been broken and honour avenged, the huge cost and risk of keeping the Roman army operating beyond the Rhine was not worth any likely benefit to be gained. Tacitus, with some bitterness, claims that Tiberius' decision to recall Germanicus was driven by his jealousy of the glory Germanicus had acquired, and that an additional campaign the next summer would have concluded the war and facilitated a Roman occupation of territories between the Rhine and the Elbe.

=== Later campaigns ===
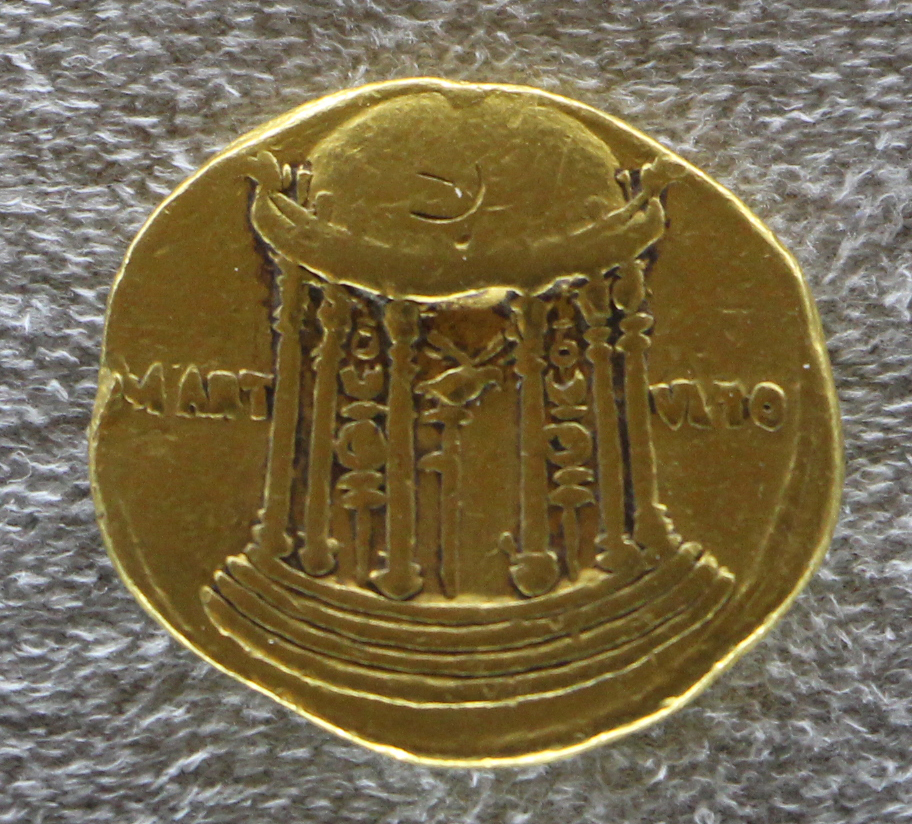
Roman coin showing the Aquilae on display in the Temple of Mars the Avenger in Rome

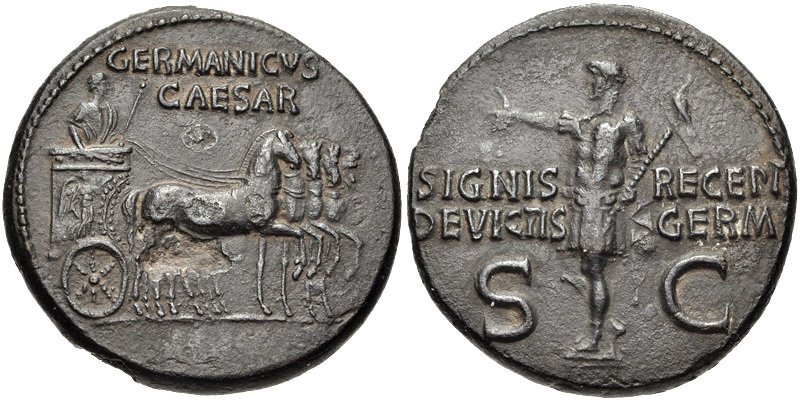
Coin showing Germanicus holding an aquila

The third legionary standard was recovered in 41 AD by Publius Gabinius from the Chauci during the reign of Claudius, brother of Germanicus. Possibly the recovered aquilae were placed within the Temple of Mars Ultor ("Mars the Avenger"), the ruins of which stand today in the Forum of Augustus by the Via dei Fori Imperiali in Rome.

The last chapter was recounted by the historian Tacitus. Around 50 AD, bands of Chatti invaded Roman territory in Germania Superior, possibly an area in Hesse east of the Rhine that the Romans appear to have still held, and began to plunder. The Roman commander, Publius Pomponius Secundus, and a legionary force supported by Roman cavalry recruited auxiliaries from the Vangiones and Nemetes. They attacked the Chatti from both sides and defeated them, and joyfully found and liberated Roman prisoners, including some from Varus' legions who had been held for 40 years.

Arminius continued to fight against the Romans, but the conflict remained a stalemate. He was poisoned by his fellow Germans in 21 AD, possibly by his own family, who feared his increasing autocracy.

== Impact on Roman expansion ==
From the time of the rediscovery of Roman sources in the 15th century, the Battles of the Teutoburg Forest have been seen as a pivotal event resulting in the end of Roman expansion into northern Europe, ending at the Rhine. This theory became prevalent in the 19th century, and formed an integral part of the mythology of German nationalism.

More recently some scholars tempered this interpretation with a number of reasons why the Roman Empire chose to stop its expansion at the Rhine, instead of other rivers in Germania.

Logistically, armies on the Rhine could be supplied from the Mediterranean via the Rhône, Saône and Mosel, with a brief stretch of portage. Armies on the Elbe, on the other hand, would have to be supplied either by extensive overland routes or ships travelling the hazardous Atlantic seas.

Economically, the Rhine was already supporting towns and sizeable villages at the time of the Gallic conquest. Northern Germania was far less developed, possessed fewer villages, and had little food surplus and thus a far lesser capacity for tribute. Thus, the Rhine was both significantly more accessible from Rome and better suited to supply sizeable garrisons than the regions beyond.

Practically, the Romans were mostly interested in conquering areas that had a high degree of self-sufficiency, which could provide a tax base for them to extract from. Most of Germania Magna did not have the higher level of urbanism at this time as in comparison with some Celtic Gallic settlements, which were in many ways already integrated into the Roman trade network in the case of southern Gaul.

In a cost-benefit analysis, the prestige to be gained by conquering more territory was outweighed by the lack of financial benefits accorded to conquest.

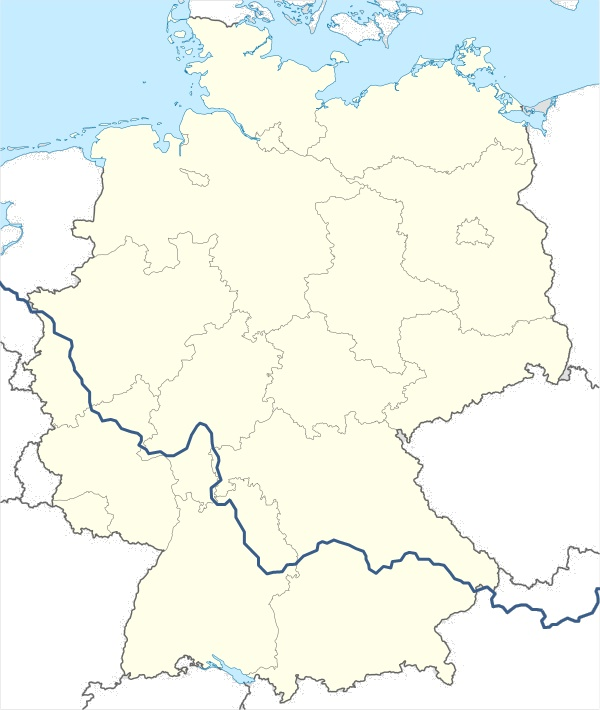
Roman Limes and modern boundaries.

Roman-controlled territory was limited to the modern states of Austria, Baden-Württemberg, southern Bavaria, southern Hesse, Saarland and the Rhineland as Roman provinces of Noricum, Raetia and Germania. The Roman provinces in western Germany, Germania Inferior (with the capital situated at Colonia Claudia Ara Agrippinensium, modern Cologne) and Germania Superior (with its capital at Mogontiacum, modern Mainz), were formally established in 85 AD, after a long period of military occupation beginning in the reign of the emperor Augustus. Nonetheless, the Severan-era historian Cassius Dio is emphatic that Varus had been conducting the latter stages of full colonisation of a greater German province, which has been partially confirmed by recent archaeological discoveries such as the Varian-era Roman provincial settlement at Waldgirmes Forum.

While the battle set an outer boundary on the "March of the Roman Empire", and the territory was not officially claimed, Roman punitive campaigns into Germania continued and they were intended less for conquest or expansion than they were to force the Germanic alliance into some kind of political structure that would comply with Roman diplomatic efforts. The most famous of those incursions, led by the Roman emperor Maximinus Thrax, resulted in a Roman victory in 235 AD at the Battle at the Harzhorn, which is located in the modern German state of Lower Saxony, east of the Weser river, between the towns of Kalefeld and Bad Gandersheim.

After Arminius was defeated and subsequently murdered in 21 AD by opponents within his own tribe, Rome tried to control Germania beyond the Limes indirectly, by appointing client kings. Italicus, a nephew of Arminius, was appointed king of the Cherusci, Vangio and Sido became vassal princes of the powerful Suebi, and the Quadian client king Vannius was imposed as a ruler of the Marcomanni.

After the Marcomannic Wars, the Romans managed to occupy the provinces of Marcomannia and Sarmatia, corresponding to modern Czech Republic, Slovakia and Bavaria/Austria/Hungary north of the Danube. Final plans to annex those territories were discarded by Commodus deeming the occupation of the region too expensive for the imperial treasury.

Between 91 and 92 AD, during the reign of Emperor Domitian, the Romans sent a military detachment to assist their client Lugii against the Suebi in what is now Poland.

== Site of the battle ==
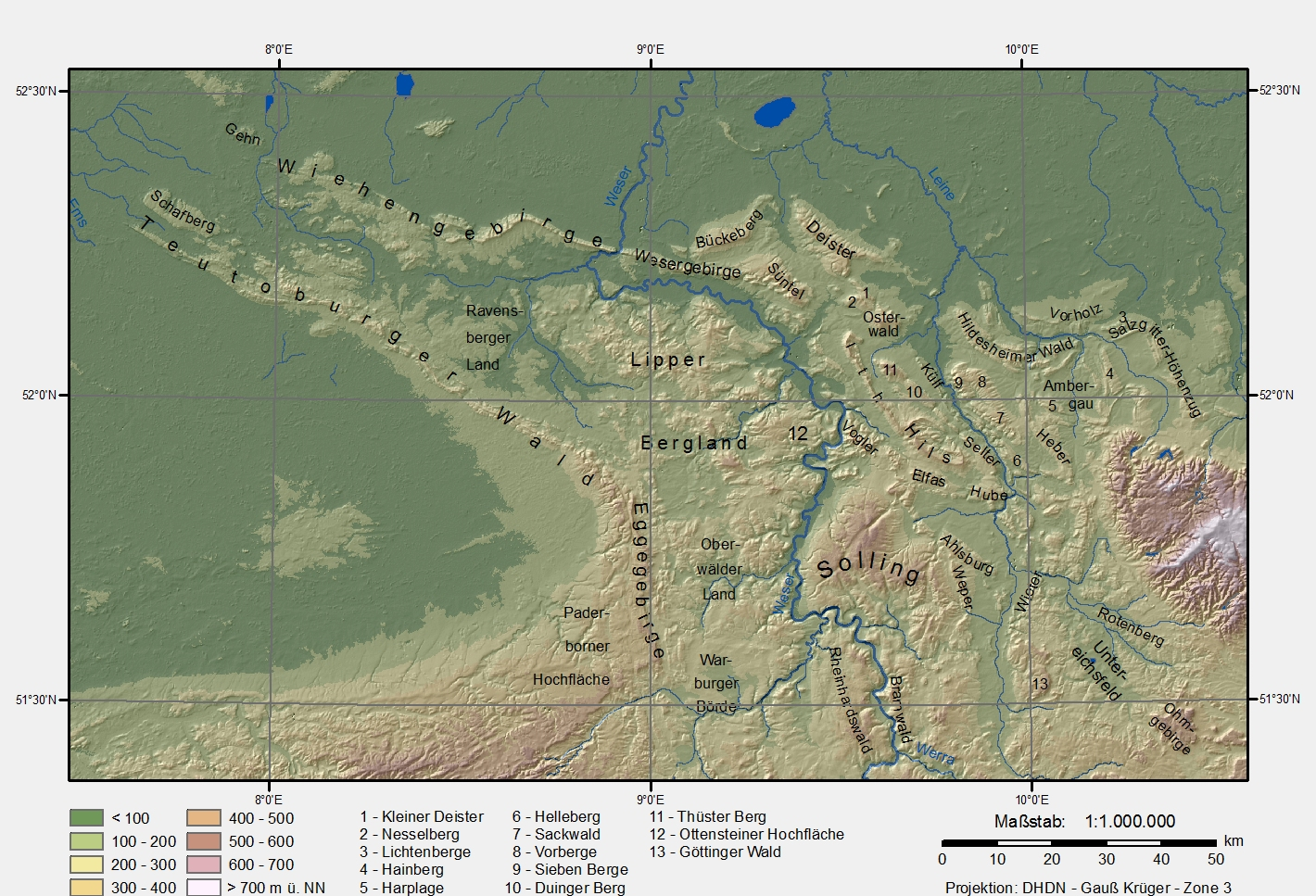
Lower Saxony Bergland

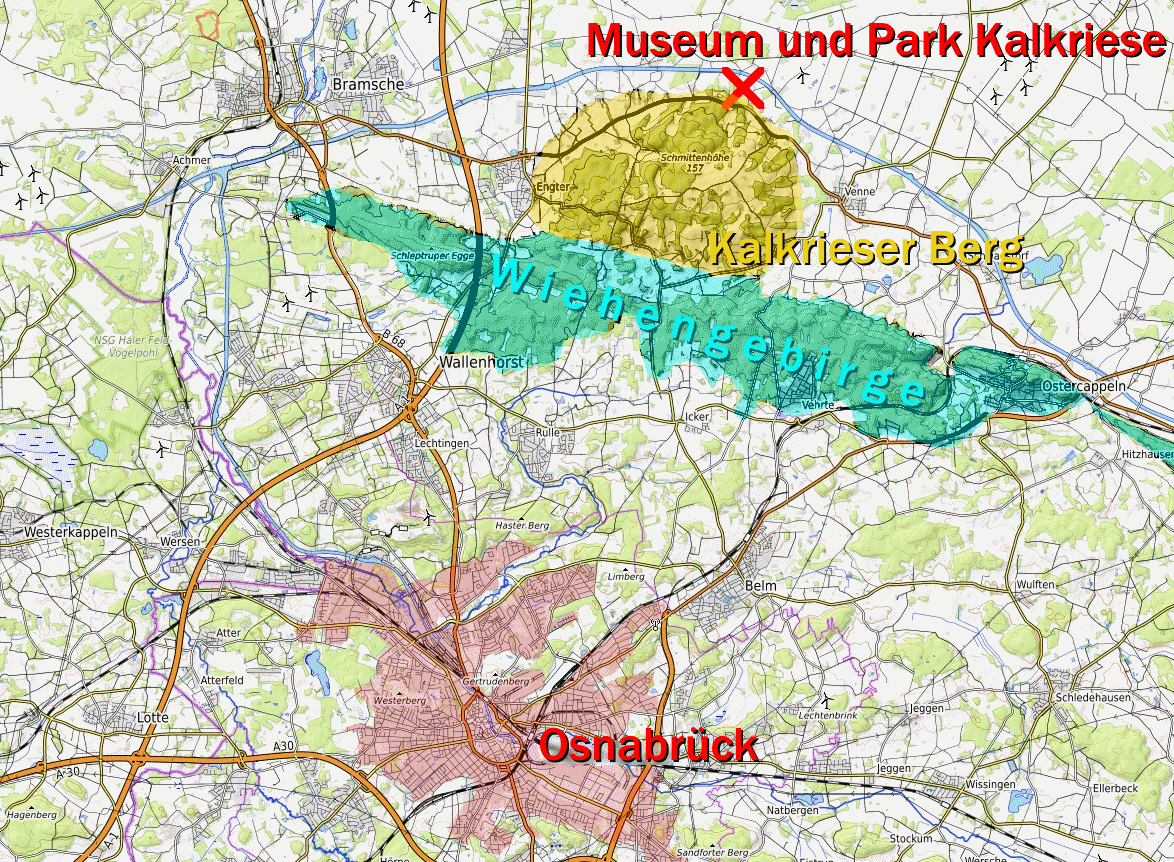
The archeological site at Kalkriese hill

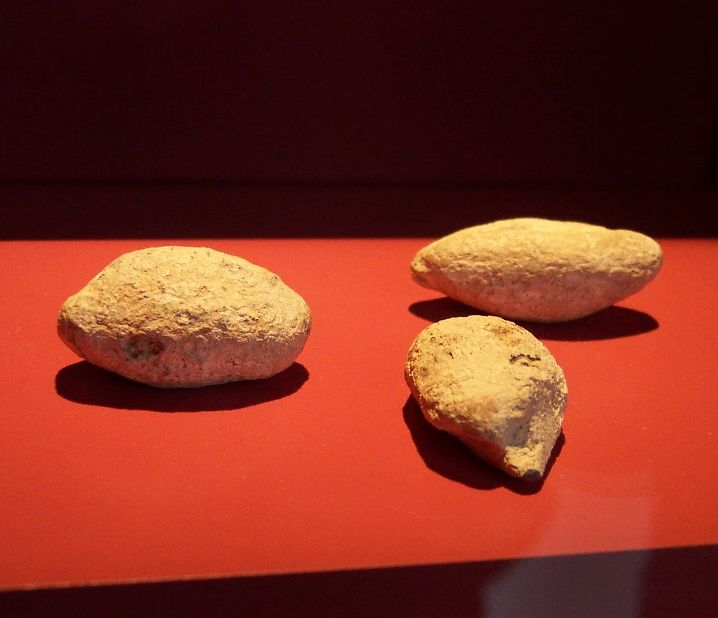
Schleuderbleie (sling projectiles) found by Major Tony Clunn in summer 1988, sparked new excavations

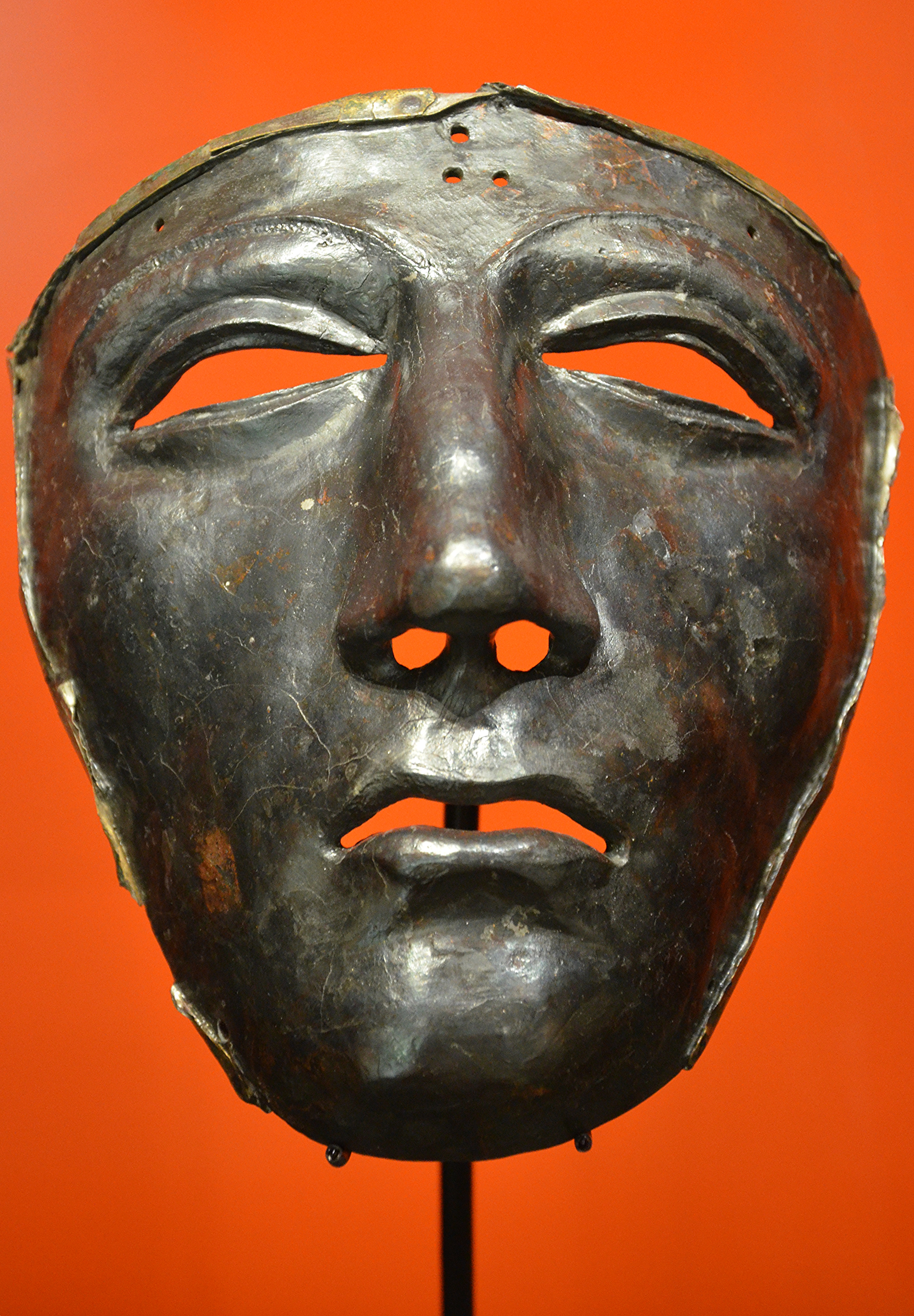
The Roman ceremonial face mask found at Kalkriese

The theories about the location of the Battle of the Teutoburg Forest have emerged in large numbers especially since the beginning of the 16th century, when Tacitus' works Germania and Annales were rediscovered. The assumptions about the possible place of the battle are based essentially on place names and river names, as well as on the description of the topography by the ancient writers, on investigations of the prehistoric road network, and on archaeological finds. Only a few assumptions are scientifically based theories.

The prehistorian and provincial archaeologist Harald Petrikovits combined the several hundred theories in 1966 into four units:

- according to the northern theory, it was on the northern edge of the Wiehen Hills and Weser Hills;
- according to Lippe theory, it was in the eastern half of the Teutoburg Forest or between this and the Weser river;
- according to the Münsterland theory, it was south of the Teutoburg Forest near Beckum or just to the east of it; and
- according to the southern theory, it was in the hill country southeast of the Westphalian Lowland.

For almost 2,000 years, the site of the battle was unidentified. The main clue to its location was an allusion to the saltus Teutoburgiensis in section i.60–62 of Tacitus' Annals, an area "not far" from the land between the upper reaches of the Lippe and Ems rivers in central Westphalia. During the 19th century, theories as to the site abounded, and the followers of one theory successfully argued for a long wooded ridge called the Osning, near Bielefeld. This was then renamed the Teutoburg Forest.

Late 20th-century research and excavations were sparked by finds in 1987 by a British amateur archaeologist, Major Tony Clunn, who was casually prospecting at Kalkriese Hill (52°26′29″N 8°08′26″E) with a metal detector in the hope of finding "the odd Roman coin". He discovered coins from the reign of Augustus (and none later), and some ovoid leaden Roman sling bolts. Kalkriese is a village administratively part of the city of Bramsche, on the north slope fringes of the Wiehen, a ridge-like range of hills in Lower Saxony north of Osnabrück. This site, some 100 kilometres (62 mi) north west of Osning, was first suggested by the 19th-century historian Theodor Mommsen, renowned for his fundamental work on Roman history.

Initial systematic excavations were carried out by the archaeological team of the Kulturhistorisches Museum Osnabrück under the direction of Professor Wolfgang Schlüter from 1987. Once the dimensions of the project had become apparent, a foundation was created to organise future excavations and to build and operate a museum on the site, and to centralise publicity and documentation. Since 1990 the excavations have been directed by Susanne Wilbers-Rost.

Excavations have revealed battle debris along a corridor almost 24 kilometres (15 mi) from east to west and little more than 1.6 kilometres (1 mi) wide. A long zig-zagging wall of peat turves and packed sand had apparently been constructed beforehand: concentrations of battle debris in front of it and a dearth behind it testify to the Romans' inability to breach the Germanic tribes' strong defence. Human remains appear to corroborate Tacitus' account of the Roman legionaries' later burial. Coins minted with the countermark VAR, distributed by Varus, also support the identification of the site. As a result, Kalkriese is now perceived to be an event of the Battle of the Teutoburg Forest.

The Museum und Park Kalkriese includes a large outdoor area with trails leading to a re-creation of part of the earthen wall from the battle and other outdoor exhibits. An observation tower, which holds most of the indoor exhibits, allows visitors to get an overview of the battle site. A second building includes the ticket centre, museum store and a restaurant. The museum houses a large number of artefacts found at the site, including fragments of studded sandals legionaries lost, spearheads, and a Roman officer's ceremonial face-mask, which was originally silver-plated.

== In popular culture ==
=== Music ===
- The 1736 opera Arminio, by Handel, glorifies the German chief who routed the Romans at Teutoburg.
- Folk music band Heilung's song "Schlammschlacht," which appeared on their 2015 album Ofnir, tells the story of the battle.

=== Literature ===
- The 1792 historical novel Marcus Flaminius by Cornelia Knight follows a main character who is a survivor of the battle.
- Die Hermannsschlacht is an 1808 drama by Heinrich von Kleist based on the events of the battle.
- Robert Graves's 1934 novel I, Claudius recounts the battle, its effect on Augustus and the aftermath as Tiberius and Germanicus attempt to recapture the lost eagles.
- Harry Turtledove's 2009 novel Give Me Back My Legions! is a fictionalized retelling of the battle.
- Ben Kane's 2015 historical novel Eagles At War is the first of a trilogy of novels and ends with the annihilation of Varus's legions.
- Wolves of Rome is a 2016 historical novel by Valerio Massimo Manfredi. First published in Italian in 2016 as Teutoburgo, republished in English in 2018, it is a fictional recounting of the life of Armin (Hermann) and the events of Teutoburg Forest.

=== Film ===
- Massacre in the Black Forest (German: Hermann der Cherusker – Die Schlacht im Teutoburger Wald), a 1967 historical film

=== Television ===
- Barbarians, a German original series detailing the Roman Imperial campaign through Germania in 9 AD, premiered on Netflix in October 2020.

=== Comics ===
- Les Aigles de Rome (The Eagles of Rome), Enrico Marini (writer, artist), Dargaud, Paris 2007–2023 (The Eagles of Rome, Paris 2014, 2023)
- Britannia: Lost Eagles of Rome. Peter Milligan (writer), Robert Gill (artist). Books 1–4, Valiant Entertainment, New York 2018

=== Games ===
- Brencis, the main antagonist of The Blood of Dawnwalker, fought as a commander in the battle.

== German nationalism ==
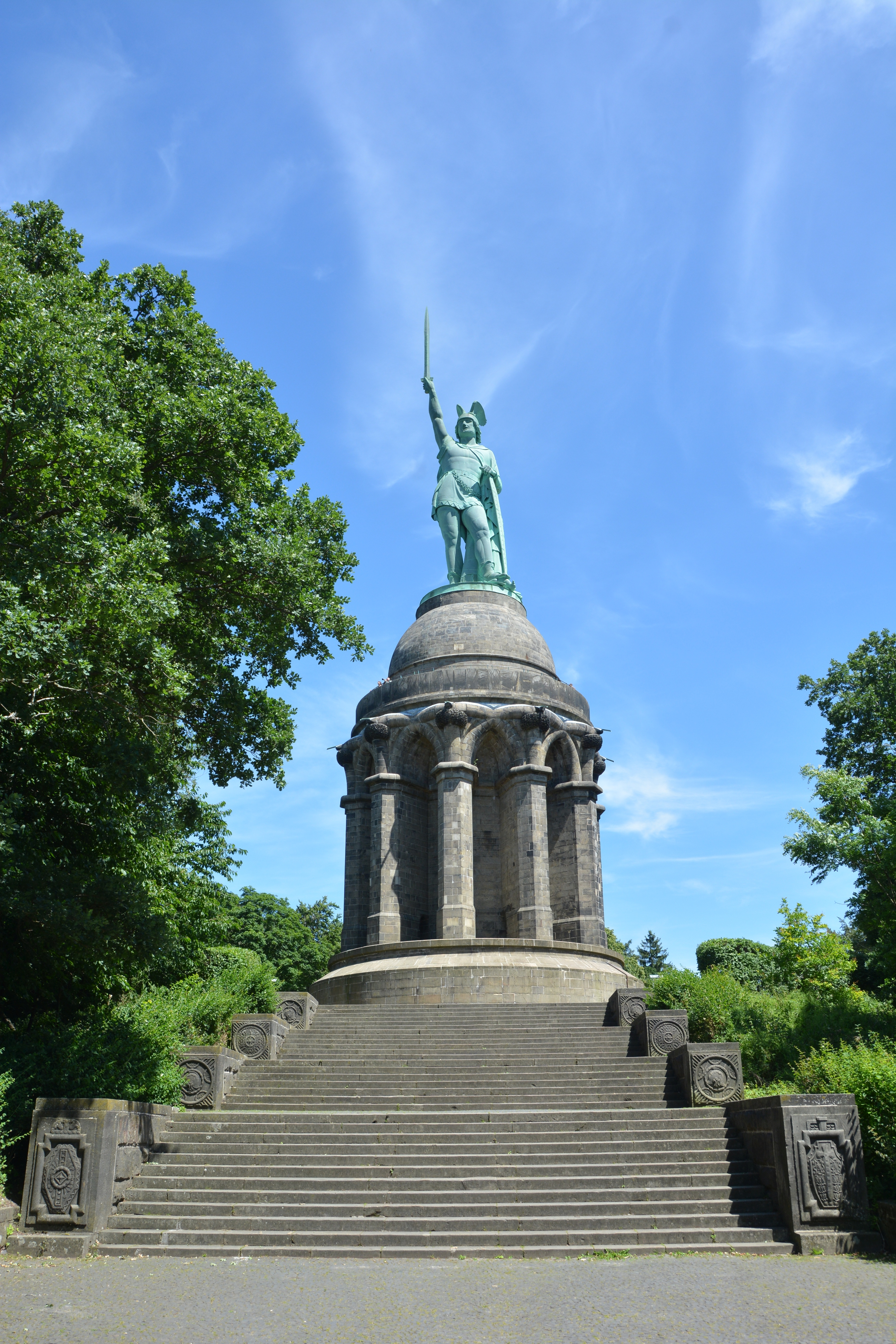
The Hermannsdenkmal monument was constructed between 1838 and 1875

The legacy of the Germanic victory was resurrected with the recovery of the histories of Tacitus in the 15th century, when the figure of Arminius, now known as "Hermann" (a mistranslation of the name "Armin" which has often been incorrectly attributed to Martin Luther), became a nationalistic symbol of Pan-Germanism. From then on, Teutoburg Forest has been seen as a pivotal clash that ended Roman expansion into northern Europe. This notion became especially prevalent in the 19th century, when it formed an integral part of the mythology of German nationalism.

The location of the site of the battle bore unique political meaning to the German states during the 19th century. Michael McNally notes that the French had found a hero of the Roman age in Vercingetorix, the commander of the Gallic grand coalition during the Gallic Wars. In 1865, they had erected a monument to Vercingétorix at the site of his last stand. Because Julius Caesar had written extensively about the Gallic Wars, the locations of the battles of the Gallic Wars were easily found. But Germany, in seeking a similar national hero, found that the site of the Varian Disaster was not so easily placed. A monument to the battle was begun in 1841, outside the town of Detmold, on the nearby summit of Grotenburg (also known as Teutberg). Finished in 1875, the statue atop it looked west, to France, a reflection of the rivalry between the two nations.

As a symbol of unified Romantic nationalism, the Hermannsdenkmal, a monument to Hermann surmounted by a statue, was erected in a forested area near Detmold, believed at that time to be the site of the battle. Paid for largely out of private funds, the monument remained unfinished for decades and was not completed until 1875, after the Franco-Prussian War of 1870–71 unified the country. The completed monument was then a symbol of conservative German nationalism.

=== Paintings of the 19th century ===
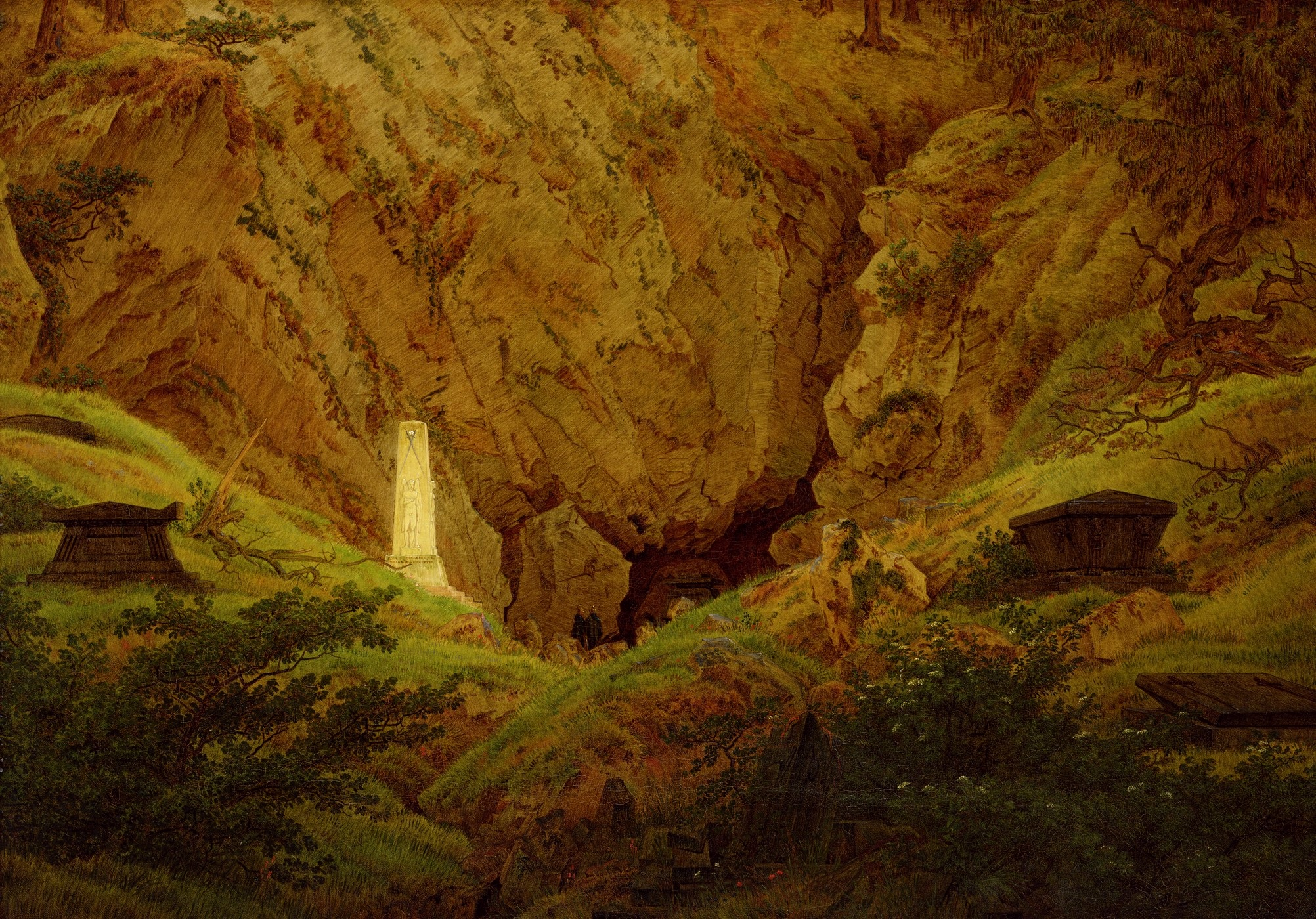
Grab des Arminius (Grave of Arminius), Caspar David Friedrich, 1812

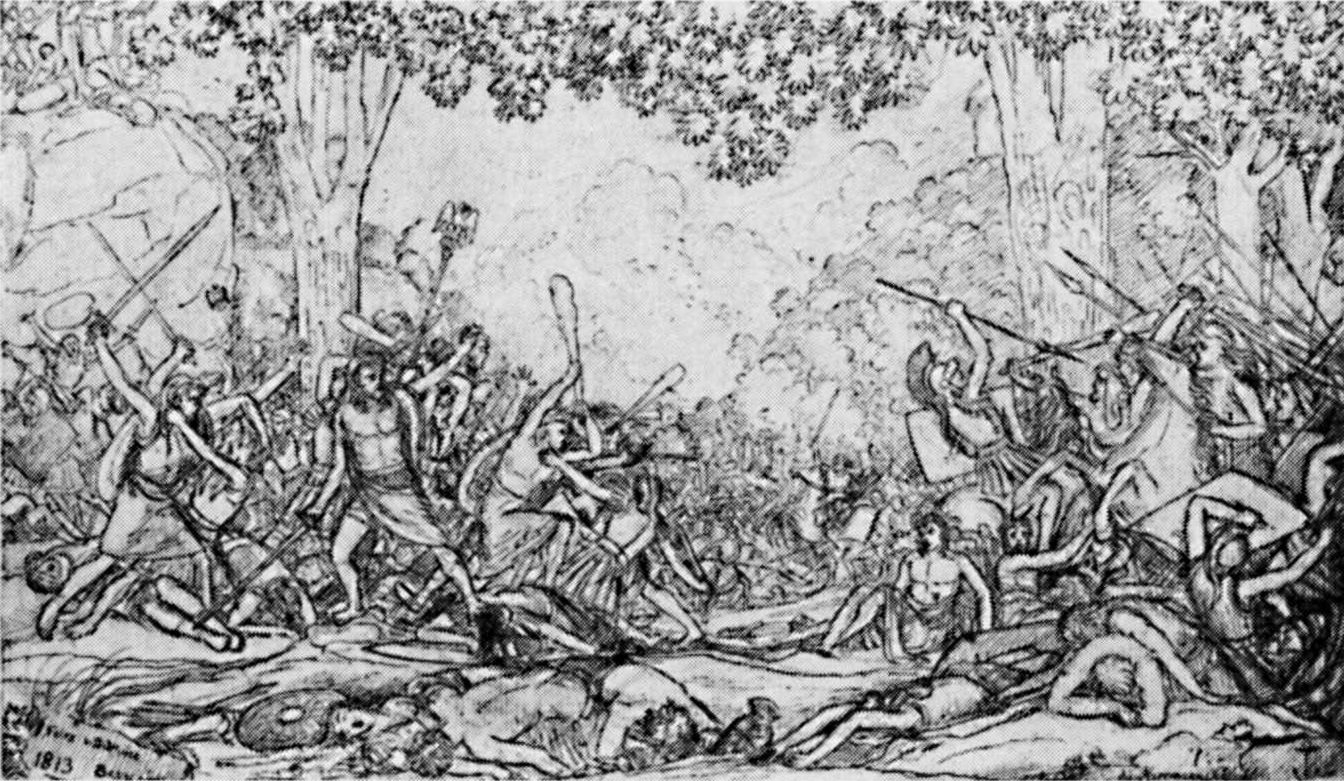
Hermannsschlacht, drawing by Crown prince Frederick William IV of Prussia, 1813

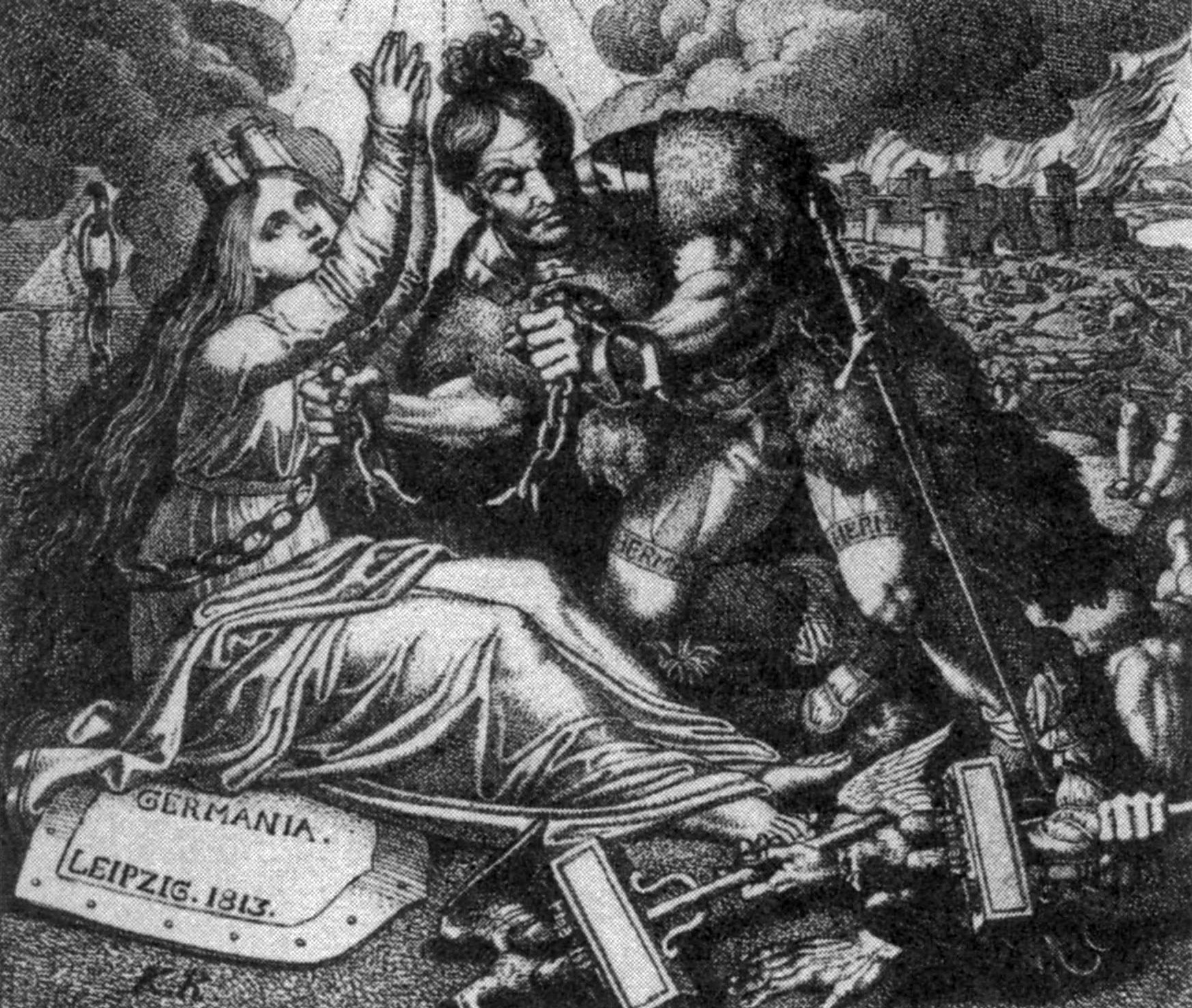
Hermann zersprengt die Ketten von Germania (Hermann breaks the chains of Germania), Karl Russ, c. 1818

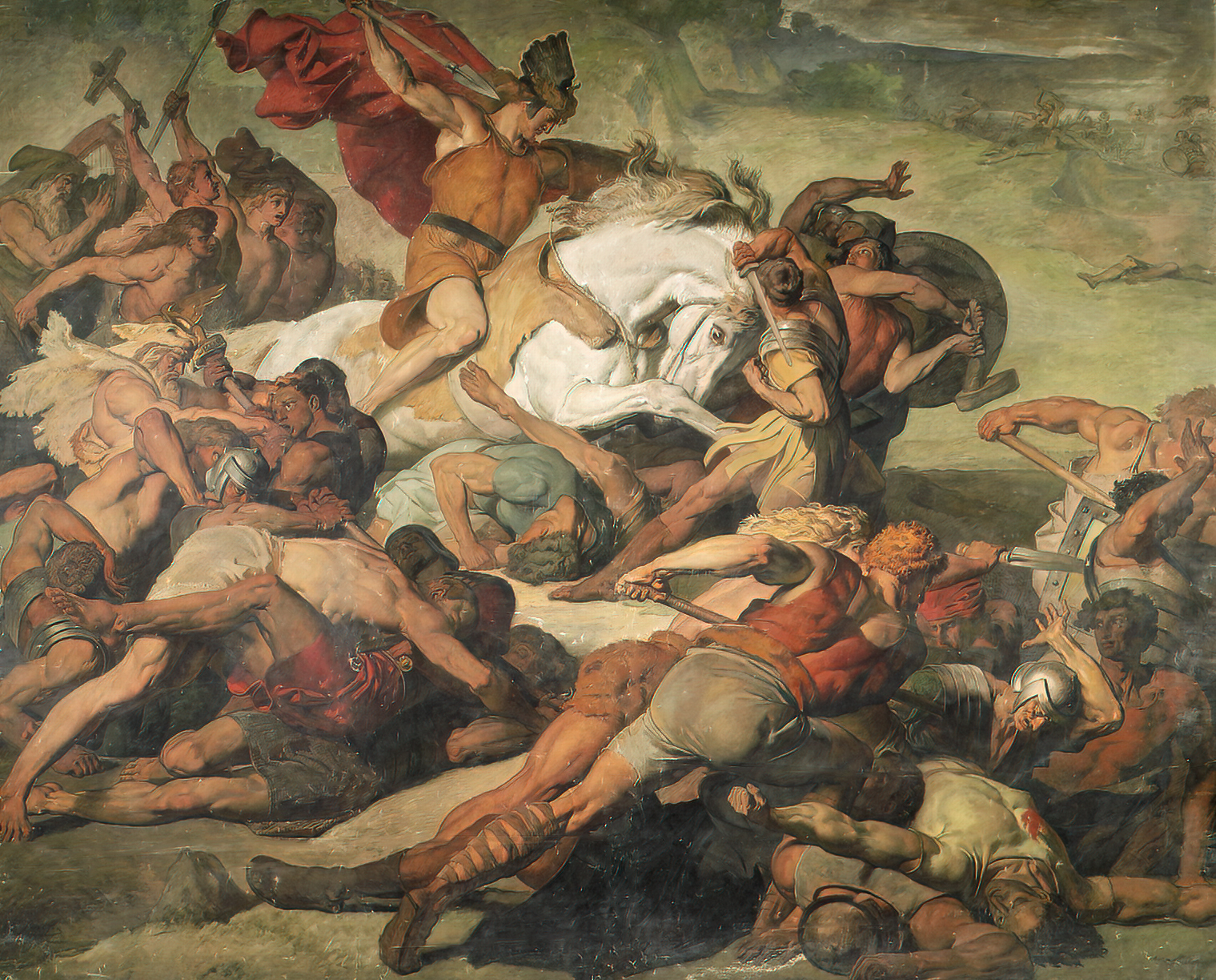
Der siegreich vordringende Hermann (The Victorious Advancing Hermann), Peter Janssen, 1873

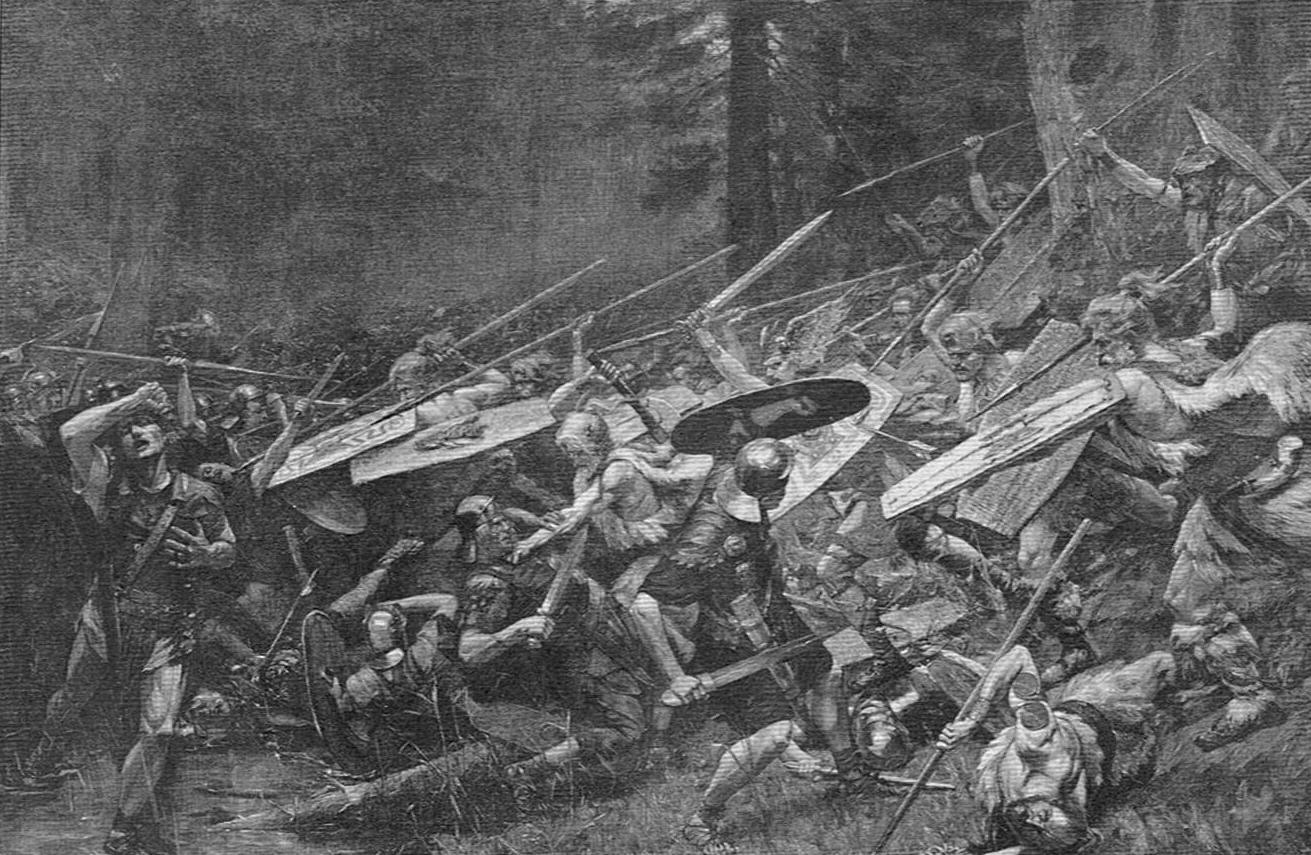
Battle of the Teutoburg Forest - Furor Teutonicus, Paja Jovanović, 1889

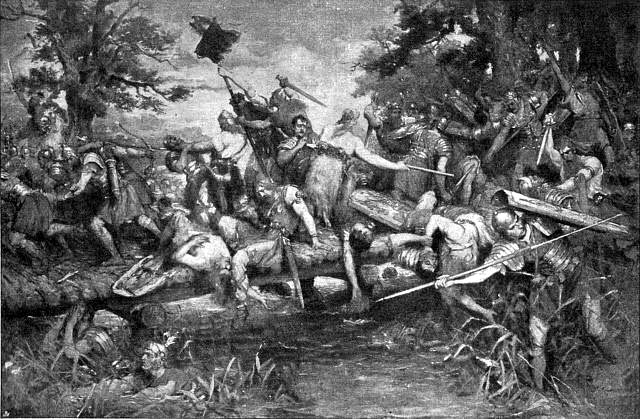
Unfortunate campaign of Germanicus, unknown artist, c. 1900

== See also ==
- Battle of Cannae
- Battle of Carrhae
- Clades Lolliana
- Demise of Legio XXII Deiotariana
- List of ancient Germanic peoples

== Sources ==
=== Ancient sources ===
- Dio Cassius, Roman History 56:18–24, written in the first half of the third century AD
- Florus, Epitome de T. Livio Bellorum omnium annorum DCC Libri duo 2:30, history/panegyric, written in the early second century AD
- Marcus Manilius, Astronomica, a poem written early in the first century AD
- Ovid, Tristia (Sorrows), poetic verses written in 10 and 11 AD
- Seneca the Younger, "Epistulae Morales ad Lucilium," referenced in Letter 47, Section 10
- Strabo, Geographia 7:1.4, geographically themed history, written around 18 AD
- Tacitus, Annals 1.3, 1.10, 1.43, 1.55–71, 2.7, 2.41, 2.45, 2.88, a history written in 109 AD
- Marcus Velleius Paterculus, Roman History 2:117–120, written in 30 AD

=== 20th century ===
- Edward Shepherd Creasy, Germans under Arminius Revolt Against Rome in The Great Events by Famous Historians, Vol. 2, compilation of historical essays published in 1905
- Wolfgang Schlüter (ed.), Römer im Osnabrücker Land. Die archäologischen Untersuchungen in der Kalkrieser-Niewedder Senke. Rasch, Bramsche 1991, ISBN 3-922469-57-4 (in German) (Romans in the Osnabrück District. The archaeological excavations in the Kalkriese-Niewedde depression.)
- Smith, William, ed. (1867). Dictionary of Greek and Roman Biography and Mythology. Vol. 2. Boston: Little, Brown, and Company.
- Gesa von Essen, Hermannsschlachten. Germanen- und Römerbilder in der Literatur des 18. und 19. Jahrhunderts. Wallstein Verlag, Göttingen 1998, ISBN 3-89244-312-2 (in German) (Hermann Battles. Images of Teutons and Romans in the literature of the 18th and 19th centuries.)
- Weidemann, T. E. J. (1996). "Tiberius to Nero". In Bowman, Alan K.; Champlin, Edward; Lintott, Andrew (eds.). The Cambridge Ancient History. Cambridge University Press. ISBN 978-0-521-26430-3.

=== 21st century ===
- Ancient Warfare special "The Varian Disaster", June 2009 (essays by various authors, including Clunn and Murdoch)
- Fergus M. Bordewich, "The ambush that changed history" in Smithsonian Magazine, September 2005, pp. 74–81.
- Wilm Brepohl, Neue Überlegungen zur Varusschlacht. Aschendorff, Münster 2004, ISBN 3-402-03502-2 (in German) (Reconsidering the Varus Battle.)
- Cawthorne, Nigel (2012). Battles That Changed History: An Encyclopedia of World Conflict. Arcturus Publishing. ISBN 978-1-84858-954-4.
- Tony Clunn, The Quest for the Lost Roman Legions, Savas Beatie LLC, 2005, 372 pp. ISBN 978-1-932714-70-8. The late author discovered the battlefield. This book is a combination of the account of his discovery, the artifacts he found, and his theory about the course of the battle, with that portion recounted in fictional style built around the history.
- Creasy, E. S. (2007). The Fifteen Decisive Battles from Marathon to Waterloo. Wildside Press LLC. ISBN 978-1-4344-8442-0.
- Davis, Paul K. (1999). 100 Decisive Battles: From Ancient Times to the Present. Oxford University Press. ISBN 0-19-514366-3.
- Boris Dreyer, Arminius und der Untergang des Varus. Warum die Germanen keine Römer wurden. Klett-Cotta, Stuttgart 2009, ISBN 978-3-608-94510-2 (in German) (Arminius and the downfall of Varus. Why the Teutons did not become Romans.)
- Durschmied, Erik (2013). The Weather Factor: How Nature Has Changed History. Hachette UK. ISBN 978-1-4447-6965-4.
- Goldsworthy, Adrian Keith (2016). In the name of Rome: the men who won the Roman Empire. New Haven: Yale University Press. ISBN 978-0-300-22183-1. OCLC 936322646.
- Gilliver, Catherine (2003). Caesar's Gallic wars, 58–50 BC. New York: Routledge. ISBN 978-0-203-49484-4. OCLC 57577646.
- Joachim Harnecker, Arminius, Varus und das Schlachtfeld von Kalkriese. Eine Einführung in die archäologischen Arbeiten und ihre Ergebnisse. 2nd ed. Rasch, Bramsche 2002 ISBN 3-934005-40-3 (in German) (Arminius, Varus and the battlefield of Kalkriese. An introduction to the archaeological work and its results.)
- Ralf Günter Jahn, Der Römisch-Germanische Krieg (9–16 n. Chr.). Dissertation, Bonn 2001 (in German) (The Roman-Germanic war (9–16 AD).)
- Johann-Sebastian Kühlborn, "Auf dem Marsch in die Germania Magna. Roms Krieg gegen die Germanen". In: Martin Müller, Hans-Joahim Schalles und Norbert Zieling (Eds.), Colonia Ulpia Traiana. Xanten und sein Umland in römischer Zeit. Zabern, Mainz 2008, ISBN 978-3-8053-3953-7, S. 67–91. (in German) ("On the march into Germania Magna. Rome's war against the Germanic tribes".)
- Fabian Link, Die Zeitdetektive. Die Falle im Teutoburger Wald: Ein Krimi aus der Römerzeit. Ravensburger, 2010, ISBN 978-3-473-34535-9. (in German) (The time detectives. The events in the Teutoburg Forest: a crime story of Roman times.) (youth fiction)
- Ralf-Peter Märtin, Die Varusschlacht. Rom und die Germanen. S. Fischer Verlag, Frankfurt am Main 2008, ISBN 978-3-10-050612-2 (in German) (The Varus Battle. Rome and the Germanic tribes.)
- McNally, Michael (2011). Teutoburg Forest, AD 9: the destruction of Varus and his legions. Peter Dennis. Oxford: Osprey Publishing. ISBN 978-1-84603-581-4. OCLC 610837226.
- Günther Moosbauer, Die Varusschlacht. Beck'sche Reihe, Verlag C. H. Beck Wissen, München 2009, ISBN 978-3-406-56257-0 (in German) (The Varus Battle.)
- Murdoch, Adrian (2004). "Germania Romana". In Murdoch, Brian; Read, Malcolm (eds.). Early Germanic Literature and Culture. Boydell & Brewer. pp. 55–73. ISBN 157113199X.
- Murdoch, Adrian (2012). Rome's Greatest Defeat: Massacre in the Teutoburg Forest. The History Press. ISBN 978-0-7524-9455-5.
- Peter Oppitz, Das Geheimnis der Varusschlacht. Zadara-Verlag, 2006, ISBN 3-00-019973-X (in German) (The mystery of the Varus Battle.) Paderborn would have been the site of the battle.
- Phang, Sara Elise; Spence, Iain; Kelly, Douglas; Londey, Peter (2016). Conflict in Ancient Greece and Rome: The Definitive Political, Social, and Military Encyclopedia [3 volumes]: The Definitive Political, Social, and Military Encyclopedia. ABC-CLIO. ISBN 978-1-61069-020-1.
- Powell, Lindsay (2014). Roman Soldier versus Germanic Warrior 1st Century AD. Oxford: Osprey. ISBN 978-1-4728-0349-8.
- Paweł Rochala, Las Teutoburski 9 rok n.e. (in Polish) Bellona, Warszawa, 2005.
- Michael Sommer, Die Arminiusschlacht. Spurensuche im Teutoburger Wald. Stuttgart 2009 (in German) (The Arminius Battle. Search for traces in the Teutoburg Forest.)
- Dieter Timpe, Römisch-germanische Begegnung in der späten Republik und frühen Kaiserzeit. Voraussetzungen – Konfrontationen – Wirkungen. Gesammelte Studien. Saur, München & Leipzig, 2006, ISBN 3-598-77845-7 (in German) (Roman-Germanic encounter in the late Republic and early Empire. Conditions – Confrontations – Effects. Collected Studies.)
- Tucker, Spencer (2010). Battles That Changed History: An Encyclopedia of World Conflict. ABC-CLIO. ISBN 978-1-59884-429-0.
- Vance, Norman (2015). "The Novel". In Vance, Norman; Wallace, Jennifer (eds.). The Oxford History of Classical Reception in English Literature (Volume 4: 1790–1880). Oxford University Press. ISBN 978-0-19-959460-3.
- Wells, Peter S. (2003). The Battle That Stopped Rome: Emperor Augustus, Arminius, and the Slaughter of the Legions in the Teutoburg Forest. New York: W.W. Norton & Company. ISBN 0-393-02028-2. Strong on archaeology; "Florus"-based theory.
- Rainer Wiegels (ed.), Die Varusschlacht. Wendepunkt der Geschichte? Theiss, Stuttgart 2007, ISBN 978-3-8062-1760-5 (in German) (The Varus Battle. Turning point of history?)
- Reinhard Wolters, Die Römer in Germanien. 5th ed. Verlag C.H. Beck, München 2006, ISBN 3-406-44736-8 (in German) (The Romans in Germania.)
- Reinhard Wolters, Die Schlacht im Teutoburger Wald. Arminius, Varus und das römische Germanien. München 2008, ISBN 978-3-406-57674-4 (in German) (The Battle of the Teutoburg Forest. Arminius, Varus and Roman Germania.)
