= Kalkrieser Berg =

Hill in Osnabrück, Germany

Coordinates: 52°23′52″N 8°6′45″E

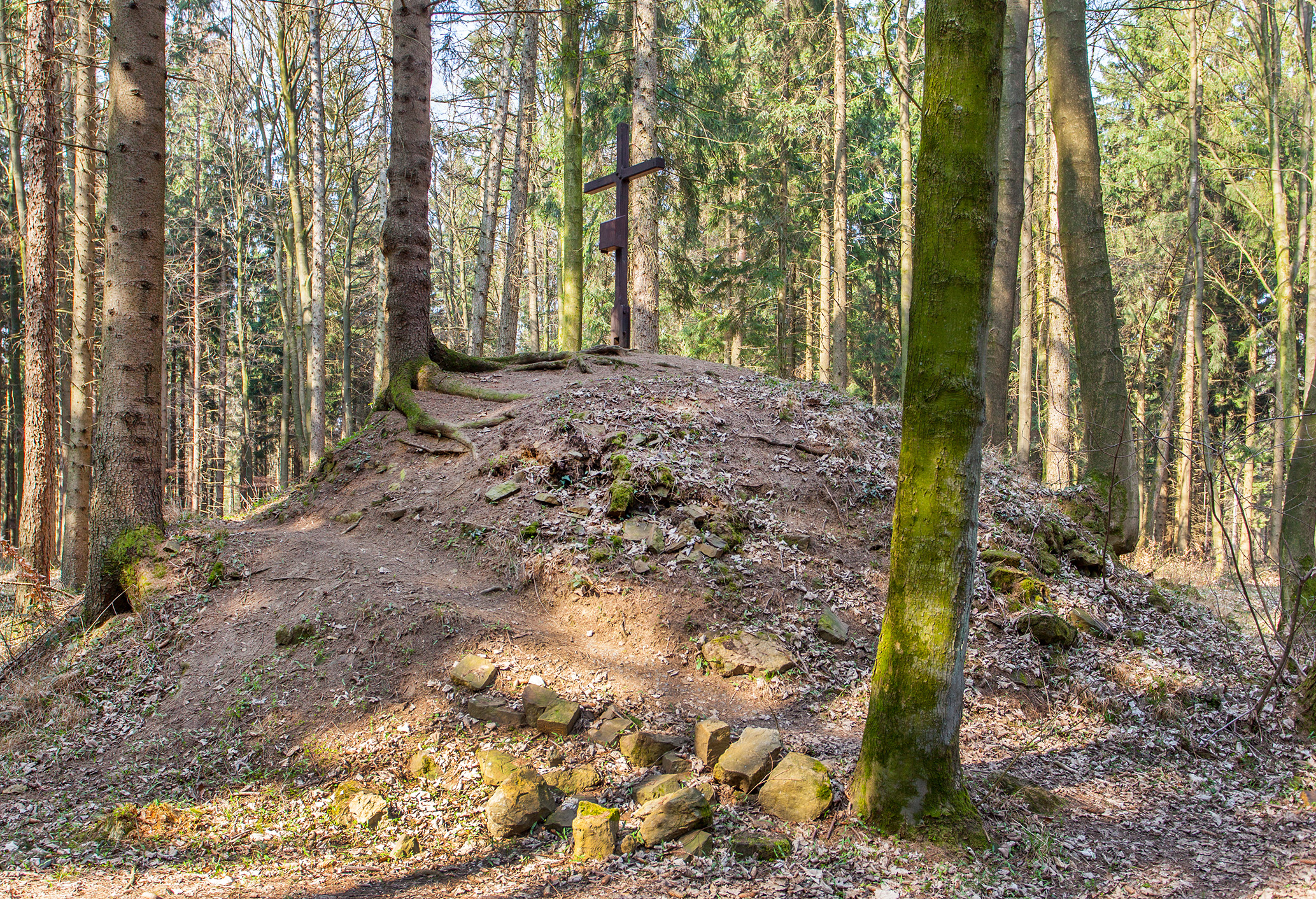
Summit cross on the Kalkrieser Berg

The Kalkrieser Berg (also called the Schmittenhöhe) is a hill, 157 m high, between the villages of Venne and Engter in the district of Osnabrück. The Kalkrieser Berg is a northern bulge of the Wiehen Hills. To the north is the great bog of Großes Moor at a height of about 47 m above sea level (NHN), the Mittelland Canal, built in the 20th century, and the Bramsche parish of Kalkriese.

Most historians believe that the narrow point – between the Kalkrieser Berg and the great bog – was where the decisive Battle of the Teutoburg Forest between the Romans and the Germanic tribes took place. In the area of Kalkriese artifacts believed to be from the battle have been recovered and many are on display in the Kalkriese Museum and Park.
