= Angrivarian Wall =

Wall in ancient Germany

The Angrivarian Wall (German: Angrivarierwall) was mentioned by the Roman historian, Tacitus (Annals II, 19–21), in connection with the campaign by the Roman general Germanicus in 16 AD, which included the Battle of the Angrivarian Wall. It was here that the legions of Germanicus and the army of Arminius had their final conflict.

The "wall" refers in this case to a defensive bank of earth or rampart, Wall being German for an embankment, not a wall.

The relevant text in the Annals (II, 19) records:

At last they chose a spot closed in by a river and by forests, within which was a narrow swampy plain. The woods too were surrounded by a bottomless morass, only on one side of it the Angrivarii had raised a broad earthwork, as a boundary between themselves and the Cherusci.

There are conflicting views today about the purpose of this earthwork. One theory is that it was an early historical border fortification between the Angrivarii and the Cherusci. Similar structures from this period have been found in Denmark, for example the Olgerdige (31 A.D.). It is also conceivable that the Angrivarian Wall was just built during the campaign of Germanicus in order to fulfil a strategic function as part of Arminius' tactics.

== Research ==
Because the location and appearance of the Angrivarian Wall has not been clarified today, the history of the wall is limited to a history of its research. Especially in the period from the 19th century to the 1960s, numerous suggestions were put forward about the location of the Angrivarian Wall, e.g. by Paul Höfer (1885), Friedrich Knoke (1887), Otto Dahm (1902), Carl Schuchhardt u. a. (1926), Otto Kramer (1930), Wolfgang Jungandreas (1944), Erich Koestermann (1957) or Johannes Norkus (1963). In most cases the location and topography of a specific site has been tactically described. From actual or postulated similarities attempts were made to prove that the wall was in the place described and could not have been elsewhere.

Modern historical research has continued such attempts. Important contributions to the literature about the campaigns of Germanicus have been published by Dieter Timpe (1967; 1968) or Reinhard Wolters (2000; 2008), without going into great detail about the Angrivarian Wall, let alone attempting to locate it.

In the last few years, hobbyists have increasingly become involved in the search, perhaps also because of the increased public interest in Roman-Germanic history after the discovery of the Battlefield of Kalkriese and in the course of the anniversary of the Battle of the Teutoburg Forest in 2009. In terms of method, they are essentially similar to the attempts made in earlier years.

== Location ==
The most serious attempt to locate the wall was by Schuchhardt in 1926, who placed it archaeologically at Leese. This theory has proved to be very prominent in historical research, partly because of the authority of the author. The Battlefield of Kalkriese has not played a part in the efforts to locate the Angrivarian Wall, at least in established historical research. But the place is seen as a candidate outside of serious historical research circles, not least because of conspicuous topographical similarities with Tacitus' report.

An overview of attempts to find the wall (as well as on other battles of the Germanicus campaigns) is at Google-Maps.

Examples of more recent candidates for the wall are:

- a rampart on the Deister Gate near Springe (Schünemann/Broszeit)
- a group of smaller ringworks in the area of Nienburg (Bökemeier)
- a grass sod rampart in the Kalkrieser-Niewedder Basin (Schoppe)
- the ringwork of Marienburg near Nordstemmen (Friebe)

== Literature ==
- Heinz-Dieter Freese: Neues vom Angrivarier-Wall in Berichte zur Denkmalpflege in Niedersachsen 3/97, pp. 138–141. (Online)
