= Kalkriese =

Village in Germany

Coordinates: 52.408°N 8.129°E

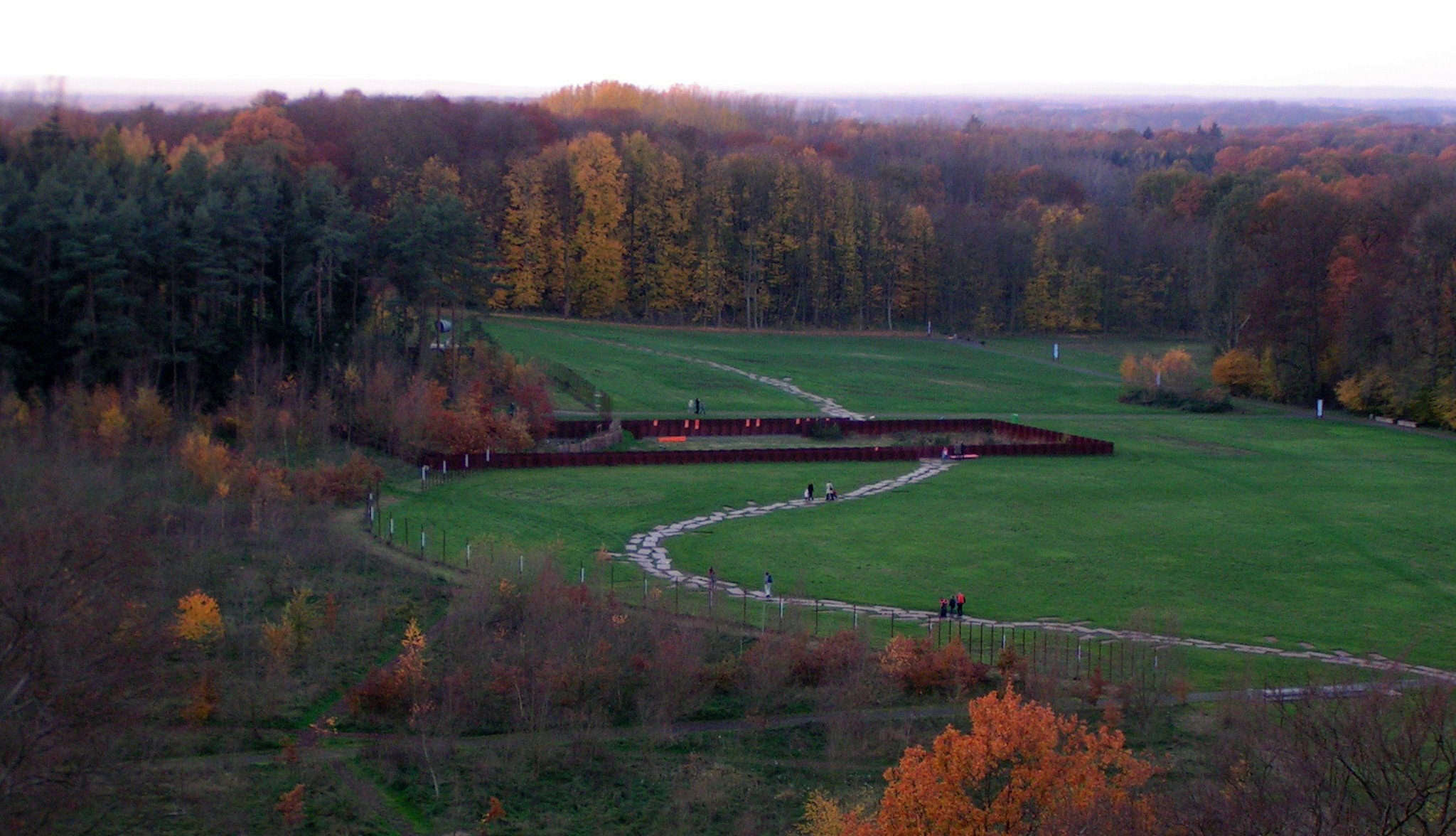
Suspected site of the final Battle of the Teutoburg Forest

Kalkriese is a village now administratively part of the city of Bramsche in the district of Osnabrück, Lower Saxony, Germany. It is on the northern slope of the Wiehen Hills, a ridge-like range of hills, north of Osnabrück. The Kalkrieser Berg or Schmittenhöhe, a hill with a height of 157 m (515 ft), is considered by archaeologists to be the likely site of the Battle of the Teutoburg Forest.

The Battle of the Teutoburg Forest (German: Schlacht im Teutoburger Wald, Hermannsschlacht or Varusschlacht), described as clades Variana (the "Varian disaster") by Roman historians, took place in what the Romans called the saltus Teutoburgiensis and has since been identified as Kalkriese in 9 AD, when an alliance of Germanic tribes ambushed and decisively destroyed three Roman legions and their auxiliaries, led by Publius Quinctilius Varus. The anti-Roman alliance was led by Arminius, an officer of Varus' auxiliary forces who had acquired Roman citizenship and received a Roman military education.

The Romans' saltus Teutoburgiensis (Teutoburg Pass) is taken to refer to the strip of cultivated land with a width of 220 m (720 ft) which lies between the Kalkrieser Berg and a large area of wetland to its north, the great bog of Großes Moor. The passage along the northern slope of the Kalkrieser Berg is a difficult one because of the need to cross many deep brooks and rivulets. Since the start of official explorations in 1988 more than 5,500 Roman objects, mainly pieces of military equipment, have been found in an area covering 17 km^{2} (6.6 sq mi): The objects include Roman swords and daggers, parts of javelins and spears, arrowheads, sling stones, fragments of helmets, soldiers' boot nails, belts, chainmail hooks, and fragments of armor. Among the most significant items is the earliest known Imperial face-mask.

Other items include locks, keys, razors, a scale, weights, chisels, hammers, pickaxes, buckets, finger rings, surgical instruments, seal boxes, a stylus, cauldrons, casseroles, spoons, and amphorae. Jewelry, hairpins, and a disk brooch suggest the presence of women. One of the inscribed objects is a plumb bob with "CHOI", or "C(o)HO(rtis) I", i.e. "property of the first cohort". The other one is a chainmail fastener with the inscription: "M AIUS (cohortis) I (centuriae) FABRICI(i) M AII (cohortis) I (centuriae) FAB(ricii)" ("Marcus Aius of cohort I, centuria of fabricii; property of Marcus Aius of cohort I, centuria of fabricii"). A coin struck to commemorate Augustus's adoption of his grandsons Lucius and Gaius in 2 BC has also been found at Kalkriese. In 2016, an archaeological investigation found eight aurei close together at the site, adding to the seven Roman gold coins previously found and tending to corroborate the identification of Kalkriese as the site of the battle.

== See also ==
- Angrivarian Wall
