= Arminius (dialogue) =

1520 Latin dialogue by Ulrich von Hutten

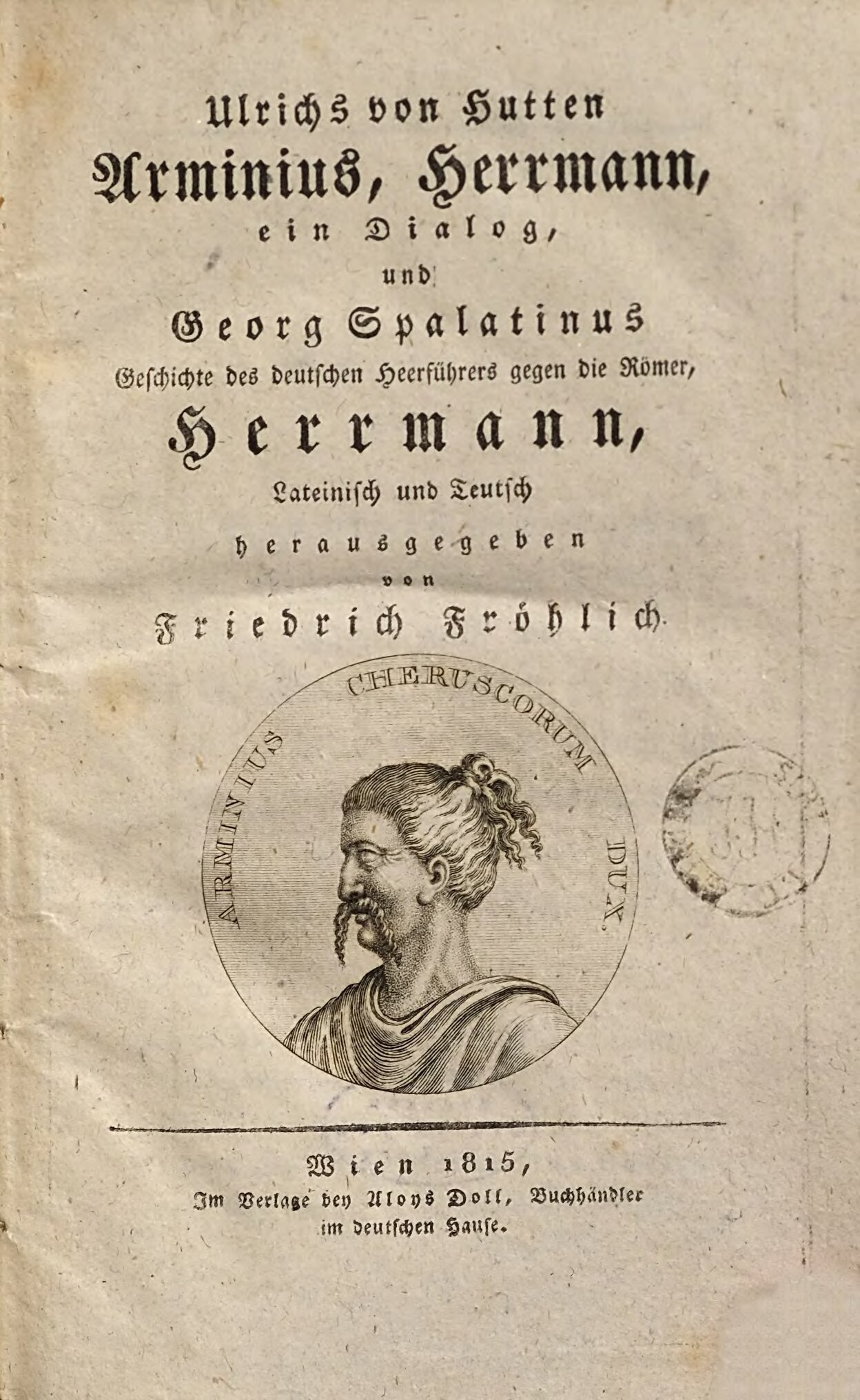
- The title page of Friedrich Fröhlich's 1815 German-Latin parallel text version of Hutten's Arminius dialogue
- Author: Ulrich von Hutten
- Original title: Arminius. Dialogus Huttenicus quo humo patriae amantissimus patriae laudem celebravit
- Language: Latin
- Publication date: 1529

Arminius. Dialogus Huttenicus quo humo patriae amantissimus patriae laudem celebravit, more commonly known simply as Arminius, is a Latin dialogue by the German Renaissance humanist Ulrich von Hutten (1488–1523). It was likely written in 1520, but not published until 1529, six years after Hutten's death.

Arminius is notable for being the first modern text to adapt the story of the Germanic military leader Arminius (often called Hermann) after the rediscovery of Tacitus' Annals and Germania in the fifteenth century, and for inspiring several later adaptations by German authors, perhaps most notably Heinrich von Kleist's 1808 play Die Hermannsschlacht.

== Background and content ==
Tacitus' Annals were rediscovered in the early 1400s and became more widely known from 1492. Part of the Annals discusses the figure of Arminius, a Germanic chieftain who commands a confederation of tribes to defeat a superior Roman force at the Battle of the Teutoburg Forest in 9AD, thereby rescuing the tribes from Roman domination. After the rediscovery of the Annals, the story of Arminius quickly became important for German humanists, as it provided a historical figure who could be idealised and presented as a model for contemporary Germans and their leaders. Thus Conrad Celtes and Jakob Wimpfeling made use of Arminius in their nationalist writings.

Hutten studied in Italy in 1515, where he became familiar with the text of Tacitus' Annals as well as Lucian's Dialogues of the Dead, but it was not until 1520 that Hutten's Arminius was composed. In writing the dialogue, Hutten took inspiration from these two sources; the author used Tacitus' positive depiction of Arminius to insert the chieftain into the scene of Lucian's twelfth dialogue, which features Alexander the Great, Scipio Africanus, and Hannibal arguing for the position of the greatest general of history, with Minos as judge. In Hutten's dialogue, Arminius joins the other leaders to plead his own case, and calls on Tacitus to verify his claims. Arminius' rhetoric is so powerful that he wins the competition, and thus Minos concludes the dialogue with the following words:

"It is indeed necessary that all who know Arminius love him deeply because of his splendid character, and further it is appropriate that you, German, be honoured, nor is it right that we ever become forgetful of your excellent qualities."

As Doyé notes, Hutten's conclusion sets Arminius amongst the great Greco-Roman generals, thus creating a place for Germans in antiquity.

== Legacy ==
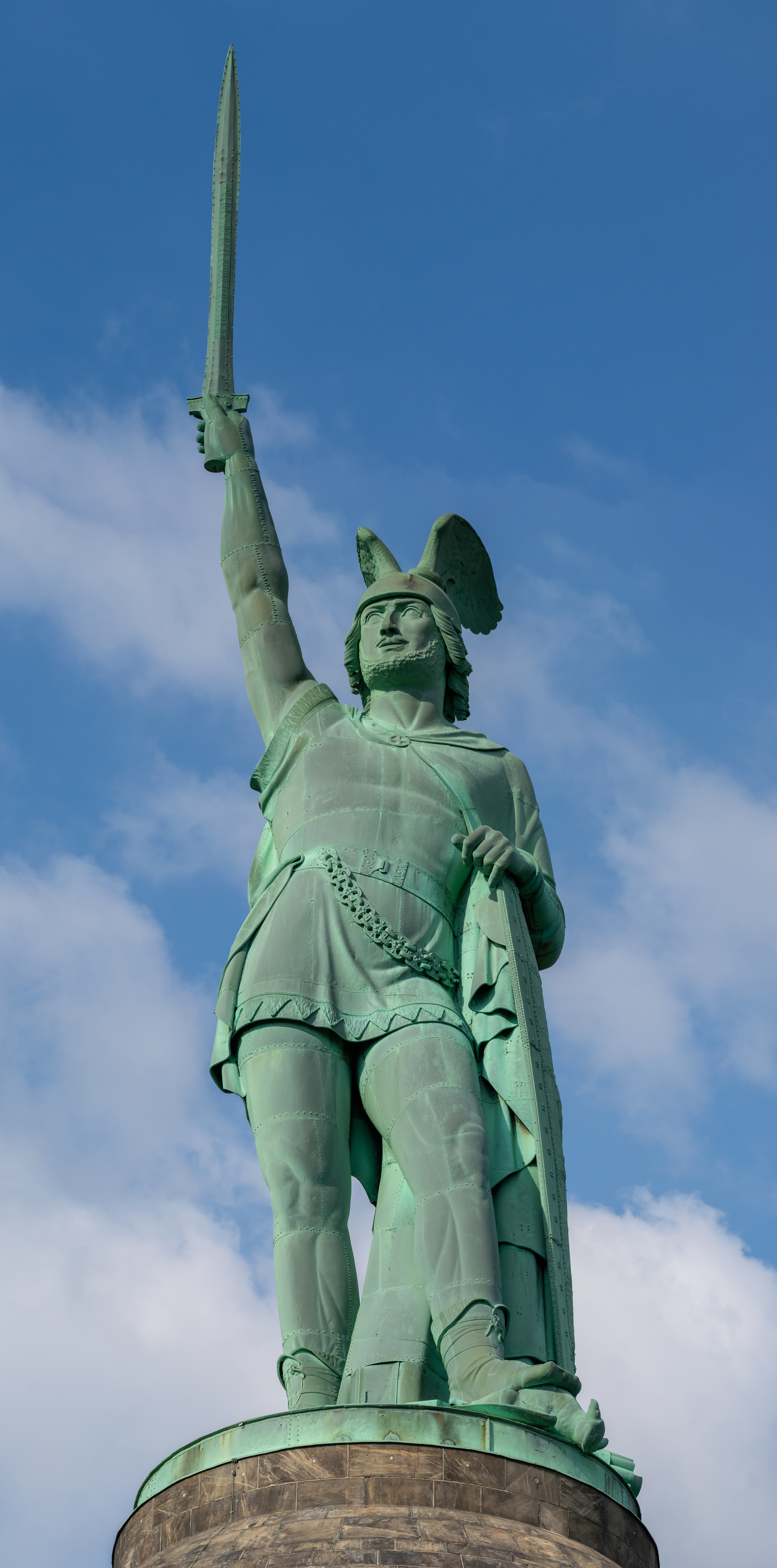
Statue of Arminius-Hermann atop the Hermannsdenkmal in Detmold, constructed 1838–1875

Hutten's dialogue was published several times in the 1500s, but the first major German translation did not arrive until 1815. Nonetheless, Hutten's Arminius is credited with having "started the Hermann cult in German poetry" and having influenced later adaptations of the Arminius/Hermann story, such as Heinrich von Kleist's 1808 play Die Hermannsschlacht. MagShamhráin argues that Kleist likely was familiar with Hutten's text in the original Latin, and views Kleist's play as directly "attacking" the Arminius dialogue.

== Sources ==
- Benario, Herbert W. (April 2004). "Arminius into Hermann: History into Legend". Greece & Rome. 51 (1): 83–94. JSTOR 3567880.
- Doyé, Werner M (2002). "Arminius". In François, Etienne; Schulze, Hagen (eds.). Deutsche Erinnerungsorte (in German). Vol. 3. Munich: Verlag C.H. Beck. pp. 587–602.
- Kuehnemund, Richard (1953). Arminius or the Rise of a National Symbol in Literature: From Hutten to Grabbe. University of North Carolina Press.
- MagShamhráin, Rachel (2012). "The two faces of a national hero: Ulrich von Hutten's 'Arminius' and Heinrich von Kleist's 'Herrmann'". In Lee, C.; McLelland, N. (eds.). Germania remembered, 1500–2009: commemorating and inventing a Germanic past. Tucson: Arizona Center for Medieval and Renaissance Studies. pp. 173–191.
- Ulbricht, Justus H (2004). "Hermann heeßt'r': Germanenphantasien als deutsche Selbstbilder zwischen Befreiungs- und Vernichtungskriegen". In Baumgartner, Judith; Wedemeyer-Kolwe, Bernd (eds.). Aufbrüche, Seitenpfade, Abwege: Suchbewegungen und Subkulturen im 20. Jahrhundert (in German). Würzburg: Königshausen & Neumann. pp. 135–146.
