= The Wife of Arminius Brought Captive to Germanicus =

Painting by Benjamin West

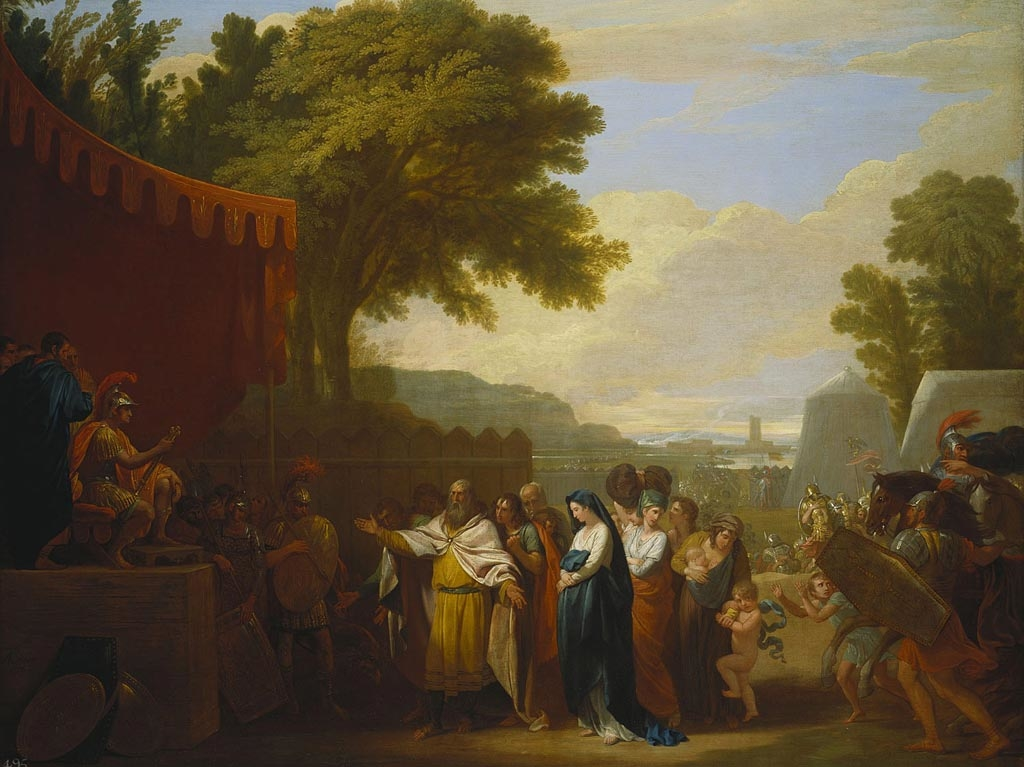
- Artist: Benjamin West
- Year: 1773
- Type: Oil on canvas, history painting
- Dimensions: 104.5 cm × 136.7 cm (41.1 in × 53.8 in)
- Location: Royal Collection; London

The Wife of Arminius Brought Captive to Germanicus is a 1773 history painting by the Anglo-American artist Benjamin West. It depicts a scene from the Roman Empire's military campaign in Germania in the early first century, loosely based on the writings of the historian Tacitus. In the Roman encampment the recently captured Thusnelda and her children are brought before the Roman commander Germanicus. Thusnelda was the wife of Arminius, who had previously inflicted a major defeat on the Romans at the Battle of the Teutoburg Forest. Germanicus gave safe passage for Thusnelda and her family to return to her husband. Germanicus is seated on a dais on the left. Segestes, dressed in yellow, is pleading on behalf of his daughter-in-law In reality, Thusnelda refused to denounce her husband and was taken back to Rome as a prisoner and was paraded along with her son Thumelicus in a triumph in 17 AD.

West, a future president of the Royal Academy, received a number of commissions from the king. The subject would have appealed to George as the House of Hanover claimed descent from Thusnelda. He was paid 150 guineas each for this work and its companion piece The Family of the King of Armenia before Cyrus, which displayed a similar classical scene of magnanimity. Both paintings remain in the Royal Collection and are on loan at Spencer House.

== Bibliography ==
- Millar, Oliver. The Later Georgian Pictures in the Collection of Her Majesty the Queen. Phaidon 1969.
- Sanders, Ruth. German: Biography of a Language. Oxford University Press, 2010.
- Watkin, David. The Architect King: George III and the Culture of the Enlightenment. Royal Collection, 2004.
