= Battle of the Angrivarian Wall =

Early Roman battle in Germany (16 AD)

- Part of the Roman campaigns in Germania (12 BC – AD 16) and the Roman–Germanic Wars
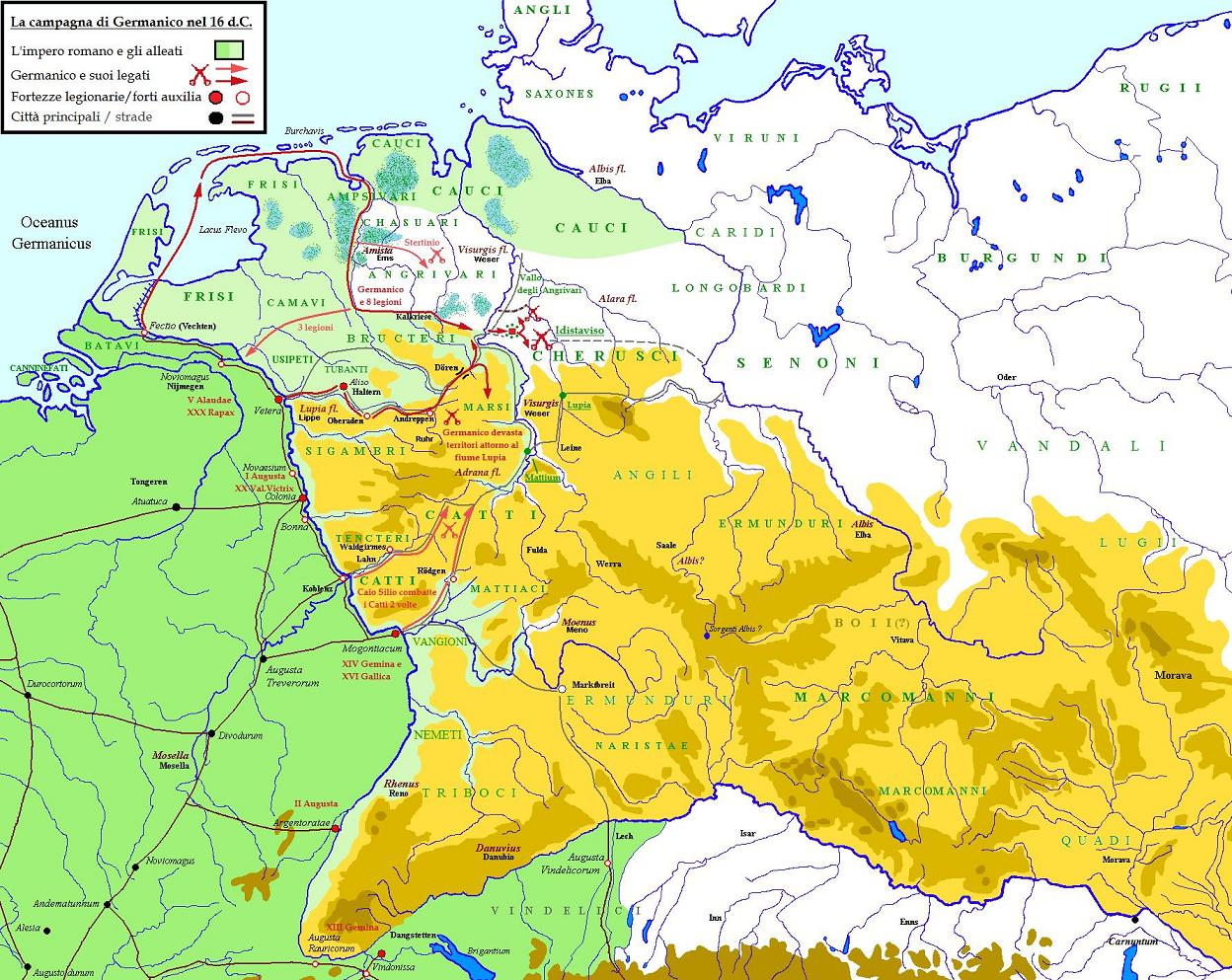
- Germanicus' military campaign in 16 AD.
Date	16 AD
Location	Near Porta Westfalica, Germany
Result	Roman victory

Belligerents
Roman Empire	Germanic tribes

Commanders and leaders
Germanicus	Arminius

Strength
8 legions 26 cohorts 8 alae Praetorian Guard; Additional allied Germanic contingents Total: at least 60,000 men	Unknown

Casualties and losses
Unknown	Heavy

The Battle of the Angrivarian Wall was fought near Porta Westfalica, Germany in 16 AD between the Roman general Germanicus and an alliance of Germanic tribes commanded by Arminius. This battle followed immediately after the Battle of Idistaviso, and was sparked by Germanic outrage over the trophy erected on that prior battlefield by the Romans.

It was the final battle of a three-year series of campaigns by Germanicus in Germania. According to Tacitus, the battle was a victory for the Romans. Germanicus, now in winter quarters across the Rhine, wanted to renew the conquest in the Spring, but was recalled to Rome by Tiberius, now Rome's Emperor. Rome handed annexed lands over to friendly chieftains and withdrew from most of Germany, as they felt the military effort required to continue was too great in comparison to any potential gain. The bases on the right bank of the Rhine were abandoned, with the exception of a few places on the North Sea coast and in front of Mainz. While the Romans were nevertheless victorious, rather than installing a Roman administration they controlled the region indirectly for centuries, recruiting soldiers there, and playing the tribes off against each other.

== Background ==
The Germanic chief, Arminius, had been instrumental in the organising of the Battle of the Teutoburg Forest, in which three Roman legions moving west to winter quarters were ambushed and annihilated by allied Germanic forces in the deep forests of western Germania. That defeat plagued the Roman psyche, and revenge and the neutralisation of the threat of Arminius were the impetus for Germanicus' campaign. In the year before the battle, 15 AD, Germanicus had marched against the Chatti and then against the Cherusci under Arminius. During that campaign, the Romans advanced along the region of the Teutoburg Forest, where the legions had been massacred and buried the bones of the Roman soldiers that still lay there. The eagle of the annihilated nineteenth legion was also recovered. The Germanic tribes generally avoided open large-scale combat, but by repeated Roman incursions deep into Germanic territory, Germanicus was able to force Arminius, at the head of a large but fractious coalition, into response. The Romans, along with the Chauci, who fought for Romans as auxiliaries, defeated the allied Germanic forces and inflicted heavy losses on them.

== Opposing forces ==
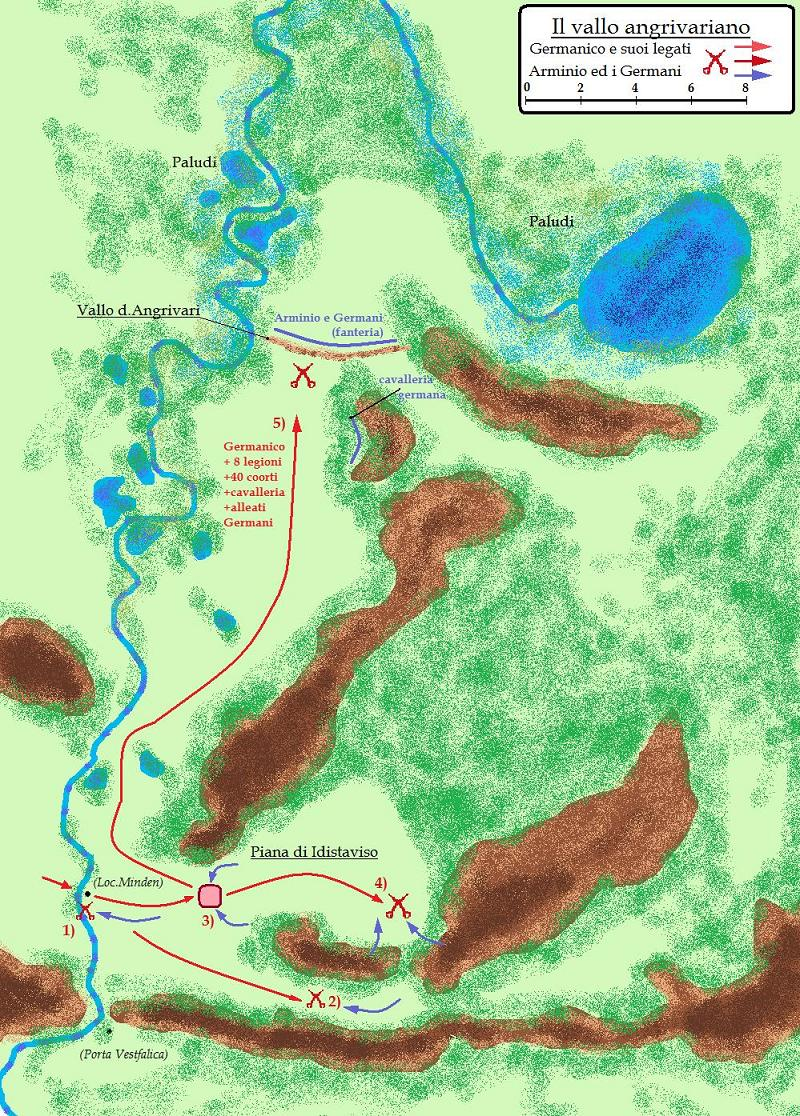
The battle of Idistaviso and the Angrivarii Wall (16 AD) between Germanicus and Arminius.

Before the battle of Idistaviso, which took place a few days or weeks earlier, Germanicus had eight legions with auxiliary troops: among these, according to Tacitus, are the Germanic allies such as the Batavi (mainly as cavalry), Germanic contingents such as the Chauci, and Celtic contingents such as Raeti, Vindelici and Gauls, fought on the Roman side. In addition, archers and horse archers have been mentioned. The size of the allied contingents is unknown, but may have been significant. For the total number of troops of the campaign army in the year 16, Hans Delbrück assumes "no less than 50,000". Klaus-Peter Johne cites 80,000. Wolfgang Jungandreas explicitly placed 100,000 men too high for the battle of the Angrivarian Wall.

Even more difficult is to establish the number of troops at the disposal of the Cherusci under Arminius. Overall, the coalition appears to have been stronger than the previous year. In essence, the Cheruschi allies would have been the tribes involved in the Battle of the Teutoburg Forest in 9 AD. Germanicus' military operations were directed against them in particular. It can therefore be assumed that the Bructeri and Marsi belonged to the coalition. In addition, Usipetes, Tencteri and Tubantes are counted among the allies.

Together with the Cherusci and the Angrivari, the Chatti belong to the three tribes that Tacitus particularly emphasizes in his account of the triumphal march of Germanicus in 17 AD:

Germanicus Caesar, celebrated his triumph over the Cherusci, Chatti, and Angrivarii, and the other tribes which extend as far as the Elbe.

It is not clear if and how the Chatti joined the Arminius alliance in the summer of 16 AD. Due to their rivalry with the Cherusci, they may have taken part in the fighting by operating independently. If one calculates the number of warriors in the coalition using the data provided by Günter Stangl for the individual tribes, one gets from 40,000 to about 75,000.

== Aftermath ==
According to Tacitus, the two battles of Idistaviso ended positively for the Roman army; the legions of Varus destroyed in Teutoburg were avenged and Germanicus also managed to recover two of the three eagles lost by the Romans in the defeat, but in reality Germanicus' campaign did not obtain decisive results. Tacitus asserts bitterly that a jealous Tiberius recalled Germanicus due to feeling threatened by a potential rise in his political appeal due to successes in avenging Teutoburg. According to other opinions, Germanicus was unable to remain permanently, despite his victories, east of the Rhine; in addition, his fleet had suffered heavy losses in a storm.

Tiberius considered that it was useless and wasteful to try again to conquer Germany as far as the Elbe river and therefore he recalled Germanicus; the emperor also believed that internal discords between the Germanic peoples would safeguard the integrity of the imperial borders on the Rhine better than a long and costly war of conquest.

It is possible that a new attempt to invade Germania took place during the reign of Claudius, with the expedition of Corbulo in 47, which was stopped in its tracks after initial successes against the Frisians and Chaucis. It is not until Domitian that new territories were acquired, between the high valleys of the Rhine and the Danube, following the campaigns carried out by his generals between 83 and 85 (in what was called the Agri Decumates).

== Bibliography ==
=== Primary sources ===
- Tacitus, Cornelius (2008), Barrett, Anthony (ed.), The Annals: The Reigns of Tiberius, Claudius, and Nero, Oxford University Press, ISBN 9780192824219

=== Secondary sources ===
- Dyck, Ludwig Heinrich (2015), The Roman Barbarian Wars: The Era of Roman Conquest, Pen and Sword, ISBN 9781473877887
- Jones, Brian W. (1992), The Emperor Domitian, Routledge, ISBN 978-0-415-10195-0
- Moser, Johannes (2011). "Germans". In Cole, Jeffrey (ed.). Ethnic Groups of Europe: An Encyclopedia. ABC-CLIO. pp. 171–177. ISBN 978-1598843026. Archived from the original on 10 January 2017.
- Renucci, Pierre (2012), Claude, l'empereur inattendu (in French), Perrin, ISBN 978-2-262-03779-6
- Seager, Robin (2008), Tiberius, John Wiley & Sons, ISBN 978-0470775417
- Scullard, Howard Hayes (2012), A History of the Roman World from 753 to 146 BC, Routledge, ISBN 9780415522274
- Tausend, Klaus (2009), Im Inneren Germaniens. Beziehungen zwischen den germanischen Stämmen vom 1. Jh. v. Chr. bis zum 2. Jh. n. Chr., Franz Steiner Verlag, ISBN 9783515094160
- Geuenich, Dieter (1998), Reallexikon Der Germanischen Altertumskunde: Gemeinde, Getodakische Kulver Und Kunst: 11, Walter De Gruyter Inc, ISBN 9783110158328
- Wells, Peter S. (2003), The Battle That Stopped Rome, Norton, ISBN 978-0-393-32643-7
- Wolters, Reinhard (2017), Die Schlacht im Teutoburger Wald: Arminius, Varus und das römische Germanien, Beck C. H., ISBN 9783406699955
