= Ulrich von Hutten =

German scholar, poet and reformer (1488–1523)

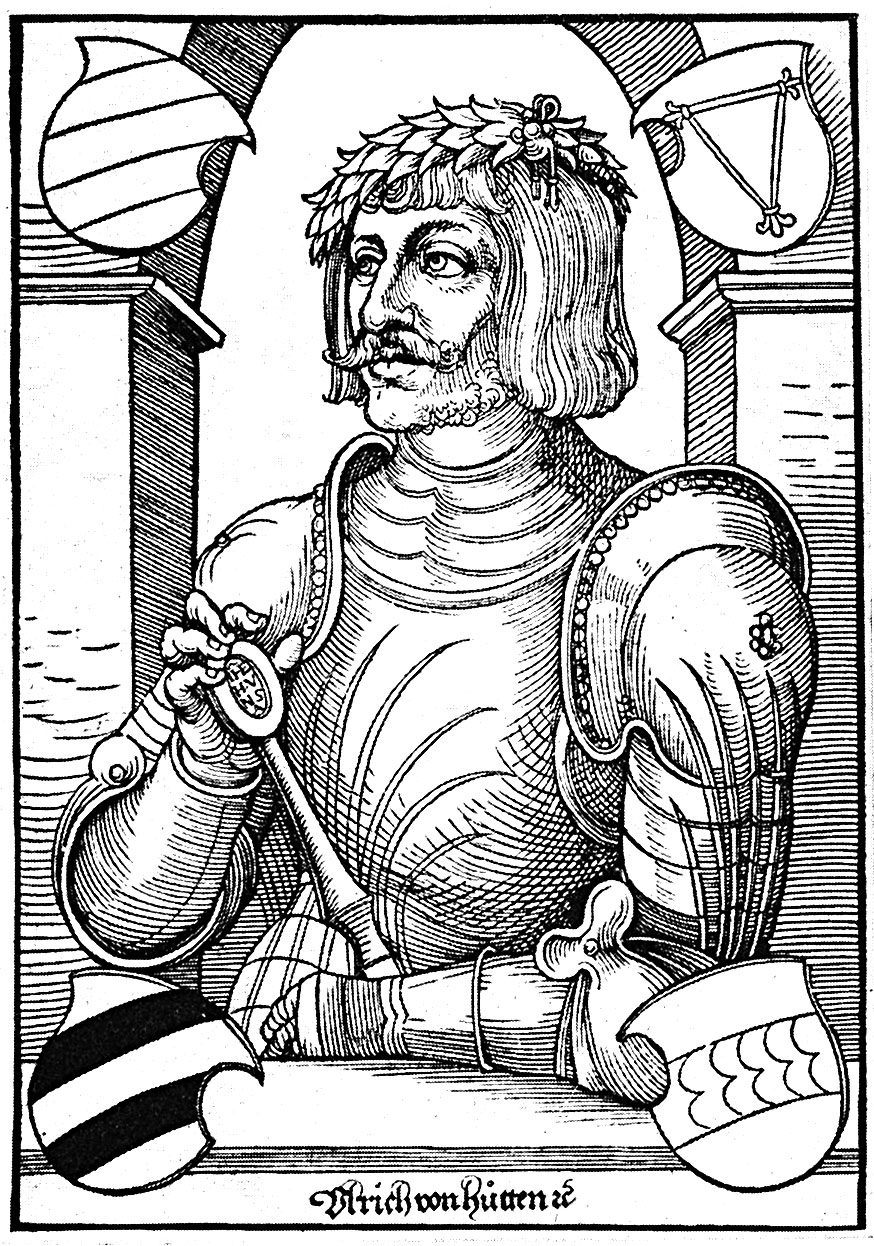
- Ulrich von Hutten, c. 1522
- Born: 21 April 1488; Steckelberg Castle, near Schlüchtern, Hesse
- Died: 29 August 1523 (aged 35); Ufenau on Lake Zurich
- Education: Theology
- Alma mater: University of Greifswald
- Occupations: Monk, knight, writer
- Writing career
- Period: Reformation
- Notable works: Epistolae obscurorum virorum De Morbo Gallico; Ars versificandi Nemo
- Movements: Reformation, Renaissance humanism, German Renaissance

Ulrich von Hutten (21 April 1488 – 29 August 1523) was a German knight, scholar, poet and satirist, who later became a follower of Martin Luther and a Protestant reformer.

By 1519, he was an outspoken critic of the Roman Catholic Church. Hutten was a bridge between the Renaissance humanists and the Lutheran Reformation. He was a leader of the knights of the Holy Roman Empire along with Franz von Sickingen. Both were the leaders in the Knights' War.

== Biography ==
His life may be divided into four parts: his youth and cloister life (1488–1505); his wanderings in pursuit of knowledge (1504–1515); his strife with Ulrich of Württemberg (1515–1519); and his connection with the Reformation (1510–1523).

=== Youth and cloister life ===
Hutten was born in Steckelberg Castle, now in Schlüchtern, Hesse. He was the eldest son of a poor but not undistinguished knightly family. As he was small of stature and sickly his father destined him for the monastic life, and, when he was ten years old, his father placed him at the nearby Princely Abbey of Fulda as an oblate to the Benedictine monks. Fulda Abbey was home to the St Rabanus Maurus School, a highly regarded institution throughout Germany, and Hutten received an excellent education. However, he disliked the restrictive nature of the monastic life, and in 1505 fled to Cologne. He thus obtained his freedom, but incurred the undying anger of his father.

=== Pursuit of knowledge ===
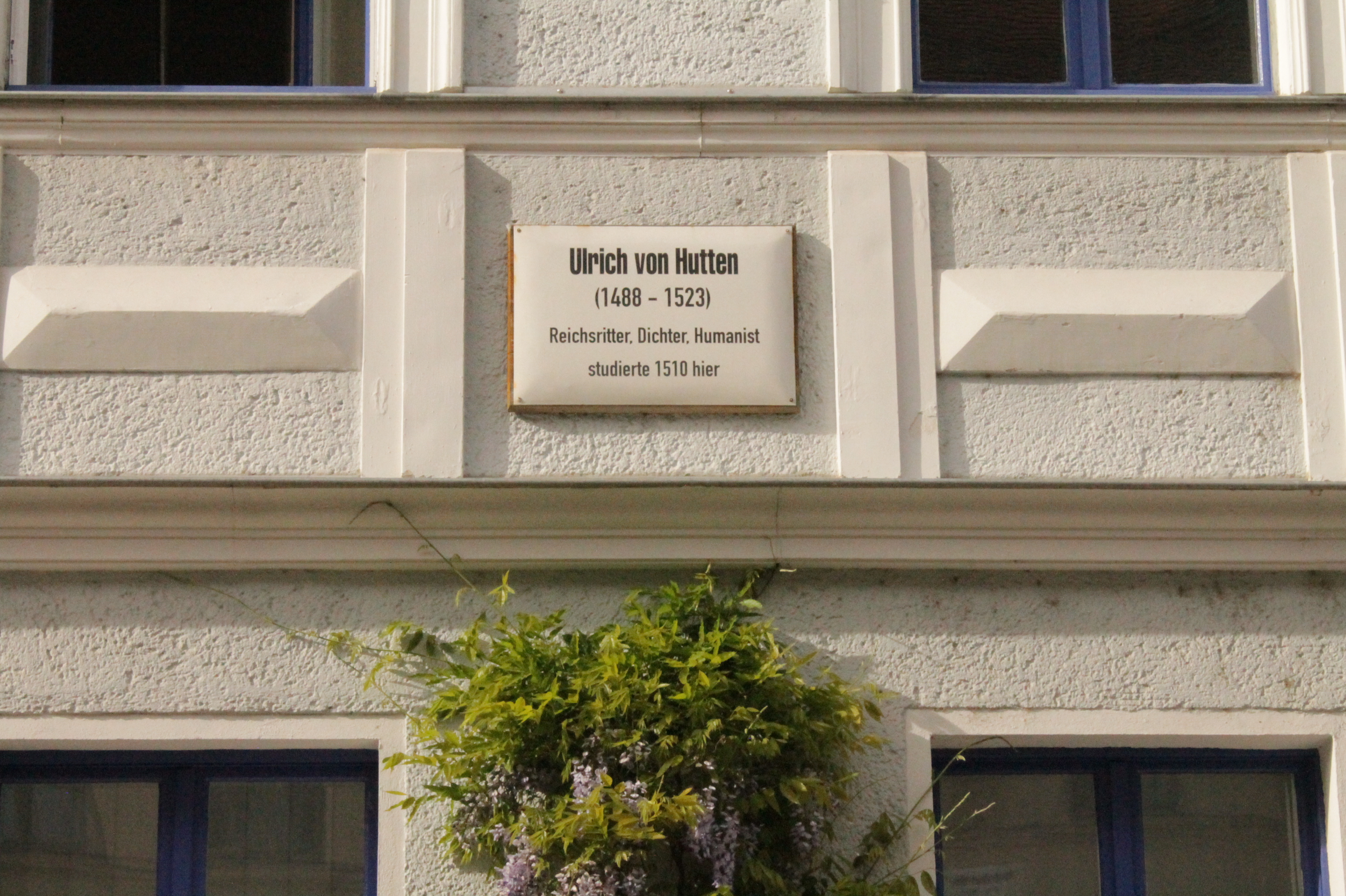
Plaque to Ulrich von Hutten, Schlossstrasse, Wittenberg

In Cologne, Hutten met Hoogstraten, Johannes Rhagius (also known as Johannes Aesticampianus), and other scholars and poets. In 1505, he went to Erfurt, but soon after rejoined Rhagius at Frankfurt an der Oder where a new university was opening. There he took his master's degree and published his first poem. In 1507, he followed Rhagius to Leipzig. The 1911 Encyclopædia Britannica reported that in 1508 he was a shipwrecked beggar on the Pomeranian coast, while the New International Encyclopedia described him as stricken down with the pestilence and recovering.

In 1509, he was studying theology at the University of Greifswald, where he was at first received kindly. In 1510 he spent time further studying theology at University of Wittenberg.

However his burgher patrons could not tolerate the poet's airs and vanity and ill-timed assertions of his higher rank. Wherefore Hutten left Greifswald, and as he went was robbed of clothes and books, his only baggage, by the servants of his late friends. In the dead of winter, half starved, frozen, penniless, he reached Rostock.

In Rostock, again the humanists received him gladly, and under their protection he wrote against his Greifswald patrons, thus beginning the long list of his satires and fierce attacks on personal or public foes. Rostock could not hold him long, and he wandered on to Wittenberg, where in 1511 he published his Ars Versificatoria, a work on versification. His next stop was Leipzig, and thence to Vienna, where he hoped to win the emperor Maximilian's favour by an elaborate national poem on the war with Venice. But neither Maximilian nor the University of Vienna would lift a hand for him.

So Hutten went on to Italy, and settled at Pavia to study law. In 1512, his studies were interrupted by war: in the siege of Pavia by papal troops and Swiss, he was plundered by both sides, and escaped, sick and penniless, to Bologna. On his recovery, he served for a short time as a private soldier in the emperor's army, but by 1514 was back in Germany. Thanks to his poetic gifts and the friendship of Eitelwolf von Stein (d. 1515), he won the favour of the elector of Mainz, Archbishop Albert of Brandenburg. Here high dreams of a learned career rose on him: Mainz should be made the metropolis of a grand humanist movement, the centre of good style and literary form.

=== Strife with Ulrich of Württemberg ===
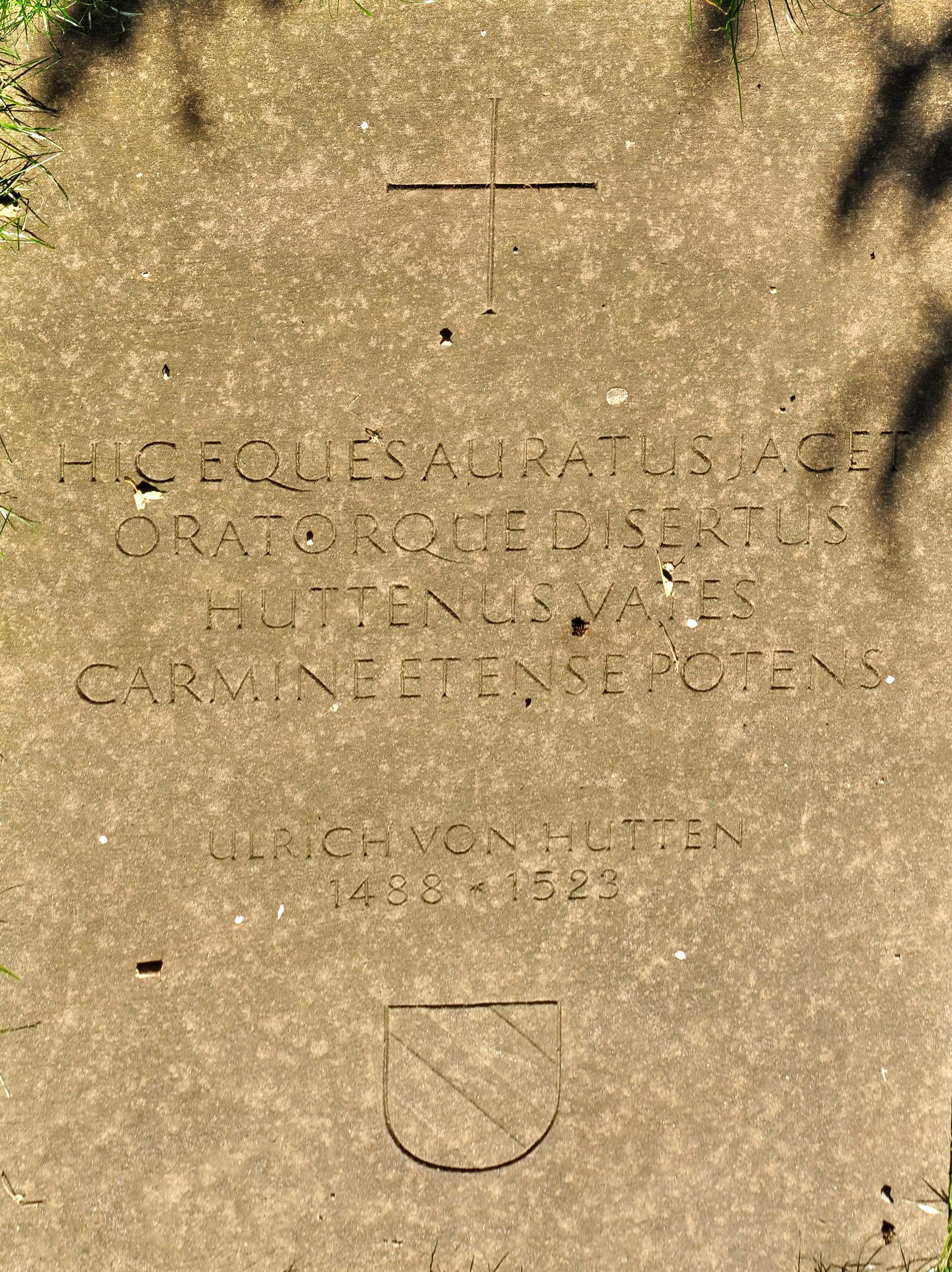
Hutten's gravestone on Ufenau island

But the murder in 1515 of his relative Hans von Hutten by Ulrich, duke of Württemberg changed the whole course of Hutten's life; satire became his weapon. With one hand he took his part in the famous Epistolæ Obscurorum Virorum (The Letters of Obscure Men), and with the other launched scathing letters, eloquent Ciceronian orations, or biting satires against the duke. These works made him known throughout Germany.

Epistolæ Obscurorum Virorum was written in support of Hutten's mentor, the prominent theologian Johannes Reuchlin, who was engaged in a struggle to prevent the confiscation of Hebrew texts. Epistolæ contained a series of fictitious letters, addressed to Hardwin von Grätz, that sarcastically attacked the scholastic theologians who were acting against Reuchlin.

Hutten went again to Italy to take the degree of doctor of laws, and returned to Germany in 1517. There the emperor took him under his protection and bestowed on him the honors of a poet's laureate crown and knighthood. However, he also spared Ulrich, duke of Württemberg. While in Italy, Hutten conceived a fierce hatred for the papacy, which he bitterly attacked in his preface to an edition of Laurentius Valla's De Donatione Constantini, published in 1517. He thus helped prepare the way for Martin Luther. In 1518, Hutten accompanied his patron, Archbishop Albert, on several official journeys to Paris and to the Diet of Augsburg, where Luther had his famous conference with Thomas Cajetan. Subsequently, Hutten established a small printing press, and published pamphlets written in the German language attacking the Pope and the Roman clergy.

=== Participation in the Reformation ===
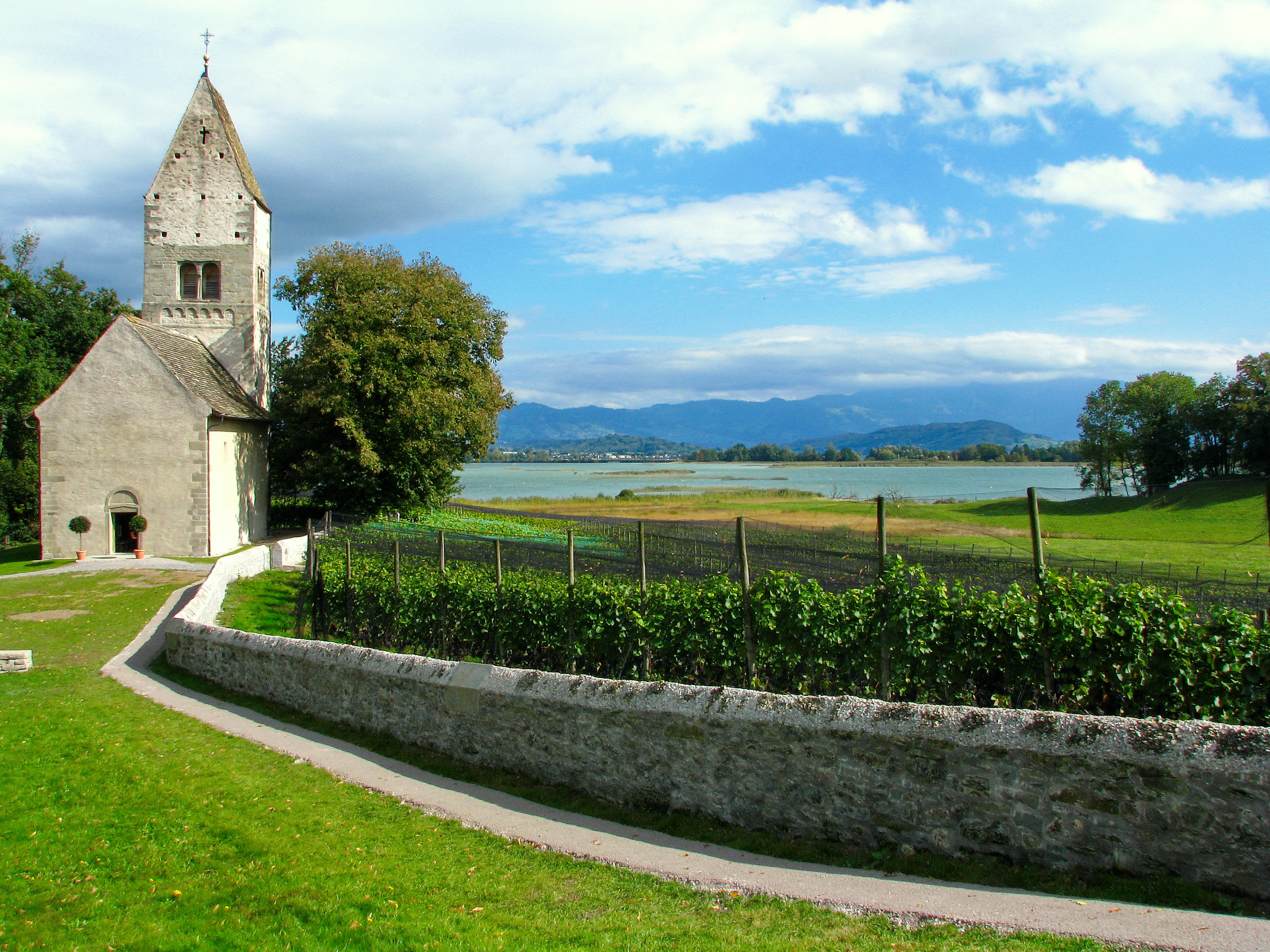
Lake Zürich, Ufenau island: St Peter & Paul church, where Ulrich von Hutten is buried

Archbishop Albert denounced him at Rome, whereupon in 1519 Hutten became a supporter of Luther and his calls for religious reform. Unlike Luther, Hutten tried to enforce reformation by military means when he, along with Franz von Sickingen attempted to begin a popular crusade within the Holy Roman Empire against the power of the Roman Catholic Church in favour of Luther's reformed religion.

In what is known as the Knights' Revolt, they attacked the lands of the Archbishop of Trier in 1522. The archbishop held out, however, and the knights were eventually defeated in 1523, destroying them as a significant political force within the empire.

Following his defeat, Hutten tried to convince Erasmus of Rotterdam to side with the Reformation. Erasmus refused to take sides. Their estrangement culminated in a literary quarrel between the two humanists. Hutten's Ulrichi ab Hutten cum Erasmo Rotirodamo, Presbytero, Theologo, Expostulatio is a collection of his arguments against Erasmus; it was printed by Johannes Schott from Strasbourg in 1523. It contains a woodcut of Hutten and Erasmus; it was thought (in 1850) to be the earliest known woodcut of the latter. Erasmus refused to see Hutten when the latter came to Basel in 1523, ill and impoverished, to see him.

Hutten died in seclusion on the island of Ufenau on Lake Zurich.

== Health issues ==
For the final 15 years of his life, Hutten suffered from the "French disease" (or syphilis), of which he died. He wrote a text in 1519, De morbo Gallico (On the French disease), about the symptoms of what is thought to be syphilis and its treatment with Guaiacum. His text is regarded as one of the first patient narratives in the history of medicine; Holbein the Younger's portrait of him from 1523 is the first known realistic portrait of a person with the disease.

In the last hundred years, two skeletons have been dug up: a male without signs of syphilis and a female with signs of syphilis. This has led to recent speculation in the American Journal of Medicine that von Hutten may have been a cross-dressing woman.

== Works ==
Hutten was more open in the expression of his opinions than any other man, probably, of his age. He did much to prepare the way for the Reformation and to promote it. He was a master of the Latin language, and excelled in satirical and passionate invective. His literary life is generally divided into three periods: (1) Period of Latin poems (1509–16); (2) period of letters and orations (1515–17); (3) period of dialogues and letters in Latin and German (1517–23). In all he published some 45 different works.

One of Hutten's major works was his Arminius (1520), a Latin dialogue featuring the Germanic chieftain Arminius which inspired later works on the Arminius theme (such as Heinrich von Kleist's 1808 play Die Hermannsschlacht) and encouraged German nationalists to view Arminius as a symbol of German national identity. Other chief works include: Ars versificandi (The Art of Prosody, 1511); the Nemo (1518); the cited work on the Morbus Gallicus (1519); the volume of Steckelberg complaints against Duke Ulrich (including his four Ciceronian Orations, his Letters and the Phalarismus) also in 1519; the Vadismus (1520); and the controversy with Erasmus at the end of his life. Besides these were many poems in Latin and German.

=== Letters of Obscure Men ===
His most noteworthy contribution to literature was his portion of the Epistolæ Obscurorum Virorum (Letters of Obscure Men). At first the cloister world, not discerning its irony, welcomed the work as a defence of their position against Johann Reuchlin; though their eyes were soon opened by the favor with which the learned world received it. The Epistolæ were eagerly bought up; the first part (41 letters) appeared at the end of 1515; early in 1516 there was a second edition; later in 1516 a third, with an appendix of seven letters; in 1517 appeared the second part (62 letters), to which a fresh appendix of eight letters was subjoined soon after.

How long Hutten was the parent of this celebrated work was long a matter of dispute. Hutten, in a letter addressed to Richard Croke, denied that he was the author of the book, but there is no doubt as to his connexion with it. Erasmus was of opinion that there were three authors, of whom Crotus Rubianus was the originator of the idea, and Hutten a chief contributor. D. F. Strauss concluded that Hutten had no share in the first part, but that his hand is clearly visible in the second part, which Strauss attributed—along with the more serious and severe tone of that bitter portion of the satire—in the main to Hutten. Holborn, however, citing the later scholarship of Bömer, regards the matter of authorship "as closed in all essential points". According to them, the first part was the work of Rubianus (save for the first epistle, written by Hutten), while the appendix and the second part were mostly by Hutten, with additional contributions from Hermann von dem Busche and others.

== Legacy ==
- As a student at the University of Bonn, Carl Schurz began work on a tragedy based on Hutten's life. He abandoned it, never to return to finish the work, when the 1848 revolution broke out in Germany.
- During World War II, the German Wehrmacht named some of its final infantry divisions after noteworthy individuals of German history. One such infantry division, fielded in March 1945, was the Infantry Division Ulrich von Hutten.
- Stanford University's motto, “Die Luft der Freiheit weht,” can be attributed to Hutten.
