= Johannes Moser =

Johannes Moser may refer to:

- Johannes Moser (cellist) (born 1979), German cellist
- Johannes Moser (ethnologist), German ethnologist
- Johannes Moser (footballer) (born 2008), Austrian footballer
