= 219 Thusnelda =

Main-belt asteroid

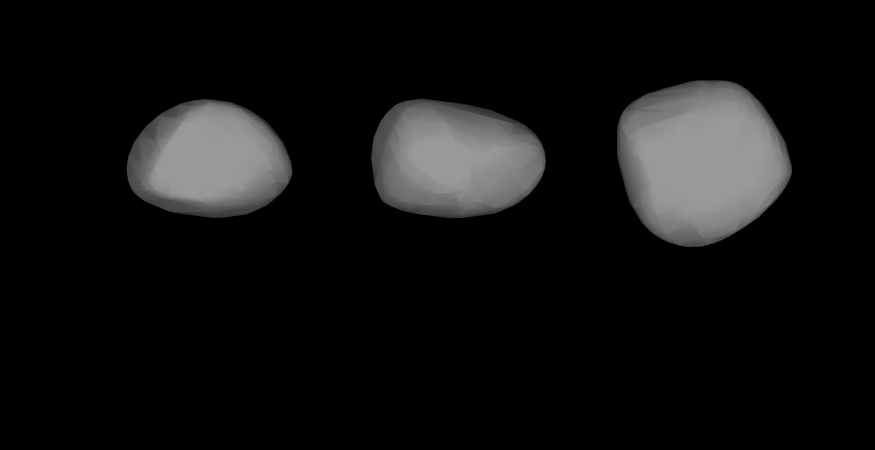
- Lightcurve-based 3D model of 219 Thusnelda

Discovery
- Discovered by: Johann Palisa
- Discovery date: 30 September 1880

Designations
- Pronunciation: /ðʌsˈnɛldə/
- Named after: Thusnelda
- Alternative designations: A880 SA
- Minor planet category: Main belt

Orbital characteristics
- Epoch 31 July 2016 (JD 2457600.5)
- Uncertainty parameter 0
- Observation arc: 117.58 yr (42947 d)
- Aphelion: 2.8796 AU (430.78 Gm)
- Perihelion: 1.8302 AU (273.79 Gm)
- Semi-major axis: 2.3549 AU (352.29 Gm)
- Eccentricity: 0.22281
- Orbital period (sidereal): 3.61 yr (1319.9 d)
- Average orbital speed: 19.41 km/s
- Mean anomaly: 238.118°
- Mean motion: 0° 16^{m} 21.864^{s} / day
- Inclination: 10.861°
- Longitude of ascending node: 200.821°
- Argument of perihelion: 142.692°

Physical characteristics
- Mean diameter: 44+2 −4 km
- Synodic rotation period: 59.7105±0.0001 h
- Pole ecliptic longitude: 300° ± 10°
- Pole ecliptic latitude: −66° ± 10°
- Geometric albedo: 0.19+0.04 −0.01; 0.2009±0.030; 0.2214 ± 0.0471
- Spectral type: S (Tholen)
- Absolute magnitude (H): 9.32, 9.34

219 Thusnelda is a typical S-type Main belt asteroid. It was discovered by Johann Palisa on September 30, 1880, in Pola and was named after Thusnelda, wife of Germanic warrior Arminius.

In 1982, the asteroid was observed using photometry from the La Silla Observatory to generate a composite light curve. The resulting data showed a rotation period of 1.24 days (29.8 h) with a brightness variation of 0.2 in magnitude.
