= Segestes =

1st century AD nobleman of the Germanic tribe of the Cherusci

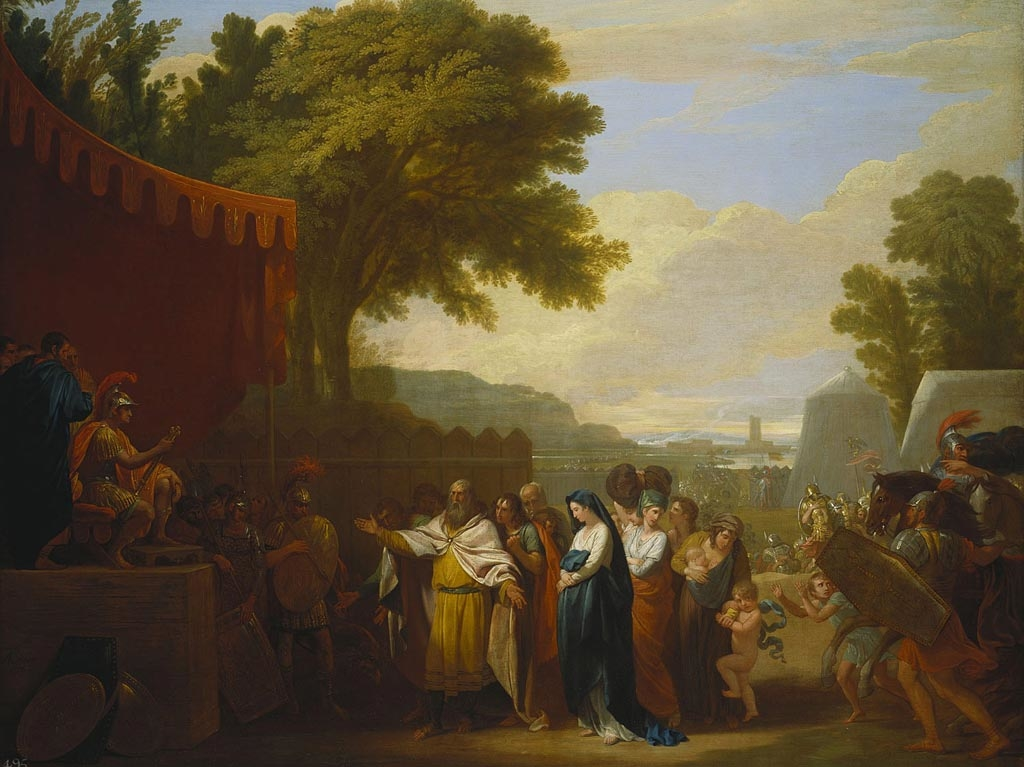
The Wife of Arminius Brought Captive to Germanicus by Benjamin West, 1773. Segestes is dressed in yellow.

Segestes was a nobleman of the Germanic tribe of the Cherusci involved in the events surrounding the Roman attempts to conquer northern Germany during the reign of Augustus and then Tiberius.

Arminius, the Cheruscan noble and military leader, had married Thusnelda, Segestes' daughter, against her father's will. As a result, Segestes, who favoured Roman overlordship, bore an ongoing grudge against Arminius. In AD 9 he warned the Roman governor Publius Quinctilius Varus of the impending uprising of his countrymen, but he was not believed. Varus and his three legions subsequently perished in the three-day Battle of the Teutoburg Forest, where several allied German tribes under the command of Arminius ambushed them.

Segestes openly turned against Arminius when Germanicus invaded northern Germany in AD 15 in a renewed attempt to establish Roman rule in the area. Besieged in his stronghold by his own countrymen, Segestes appealed for help to Germanicus whose forces relieved the siege, and Segestes then handed over his pregnant daughter Thusnelda, Arminius' wife, to Germanicus as a prisoner. Thusnelda was taken to Rome and, together with her brother Segimundus, displayed in Germanicus' victory parade in AD 17, with her father as an honoured spectator. Thusnelda never returned to her homeland. Arminius' only son, Thumelicus, whom she bore while in captivity, was trained as a gladiator in Ravenna and is considered to have died in a gladiator fight before reaching the age of 20.

In AD 21, Segestes and other members of his family killed Arminius. Segestes was eventually given a residence by Germanicus in a Roman province west of the Rhine.

== Etymology ==
Segestes' name is believed to derive from Germanic roots meaning "master of victory;" Germanic *segaz ("victory") and Old Frankish gastes ("master").

== Websites ==
- Varusschlacht - Clades Variana - Aliso, in German
- Thusnelda, part of the Encyclopædia Romana by James Grout.
