= Thusnelda =

1st century AD Germanic noblewoman and wife of Arminius

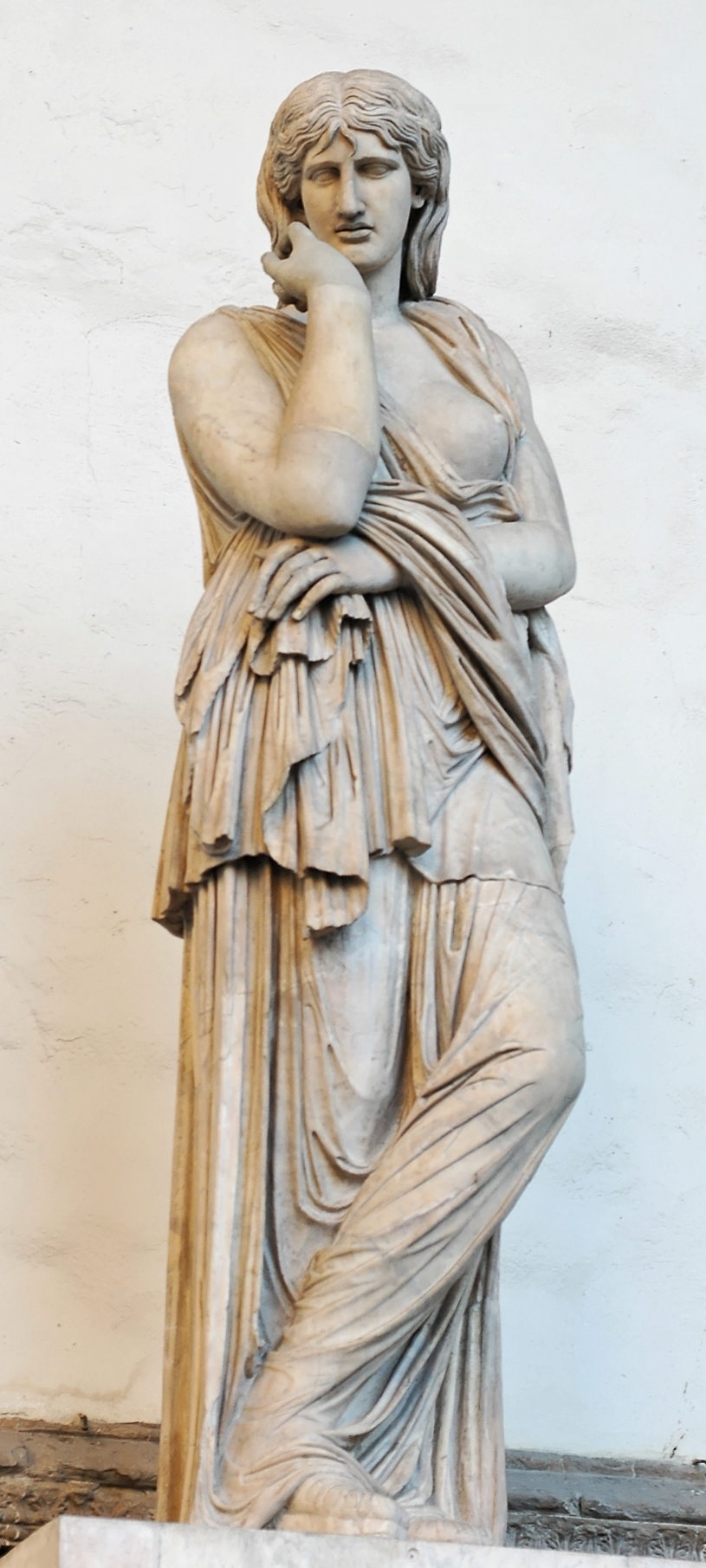
Thusnelda statue in Loggia dei Lanzi, Florence.

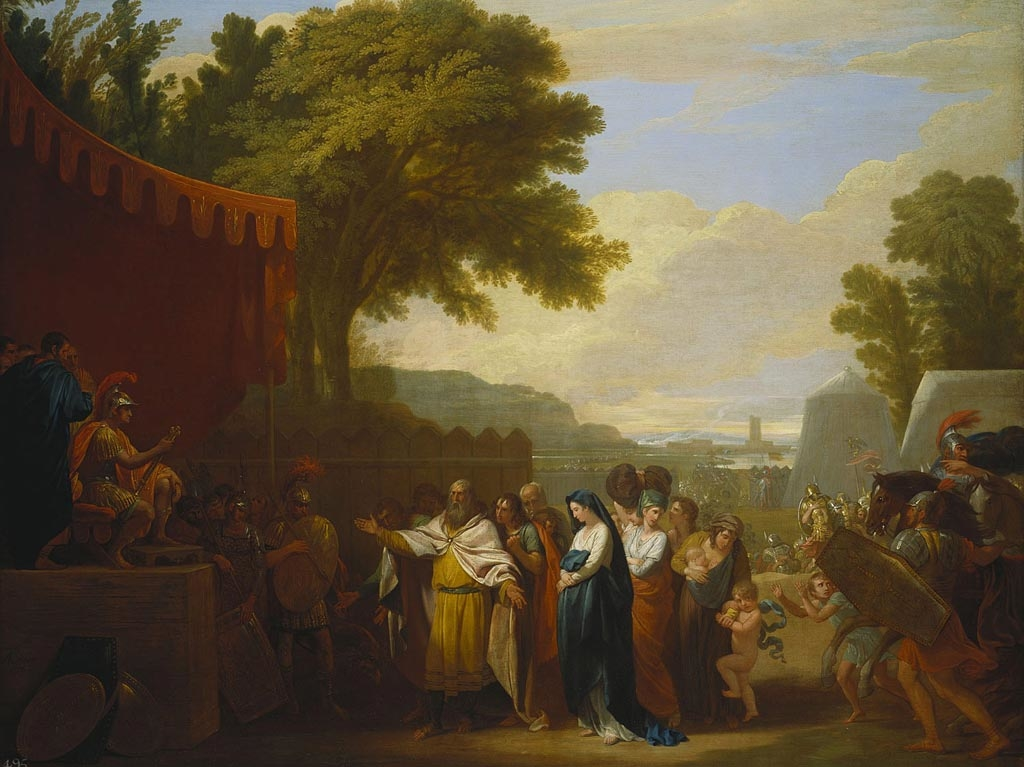
The Wife of Arminius Brought Captive to Germanicus by Benjamin West, 1773

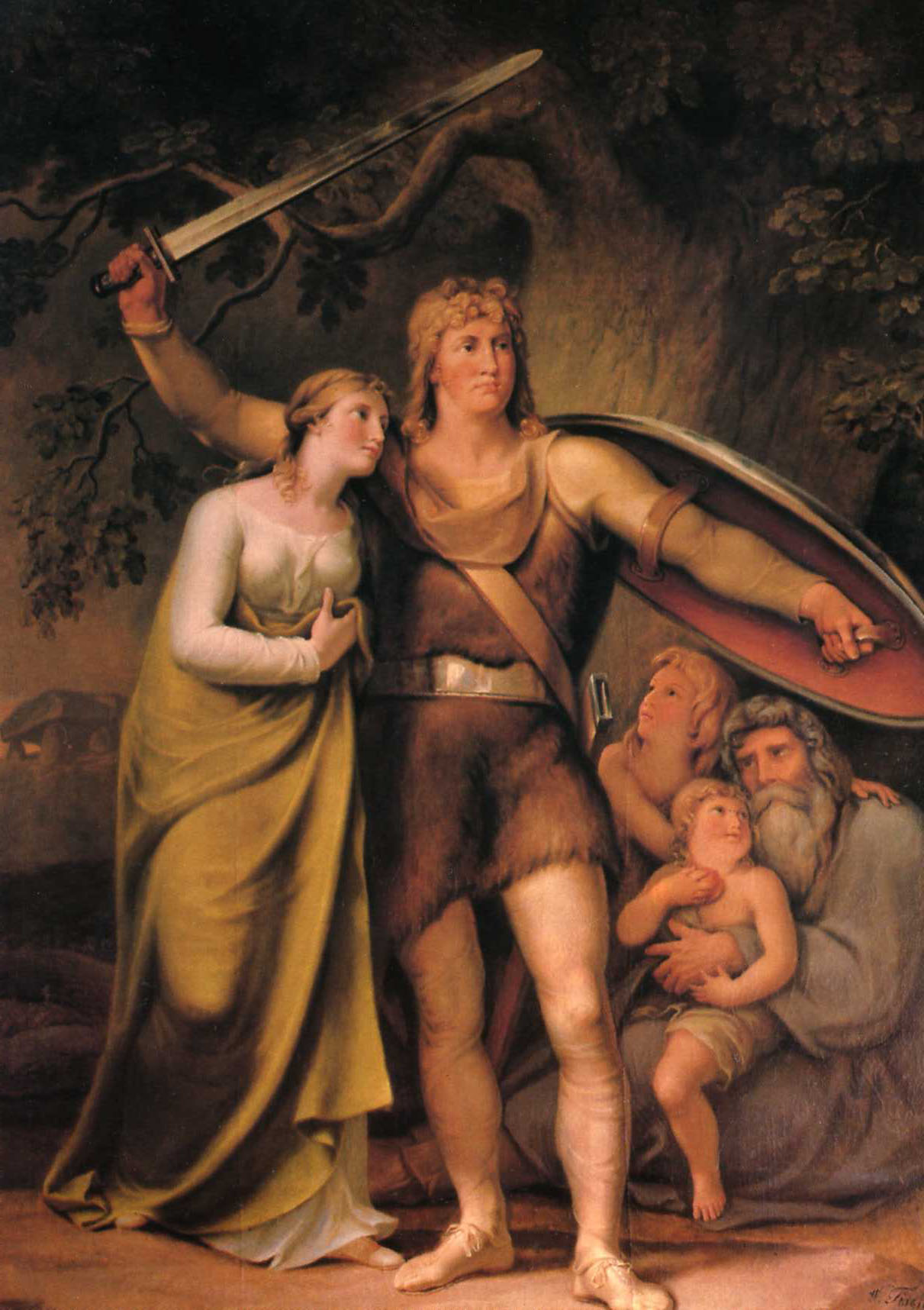
Hermann and Thusnelda (Tischbein, 1822)

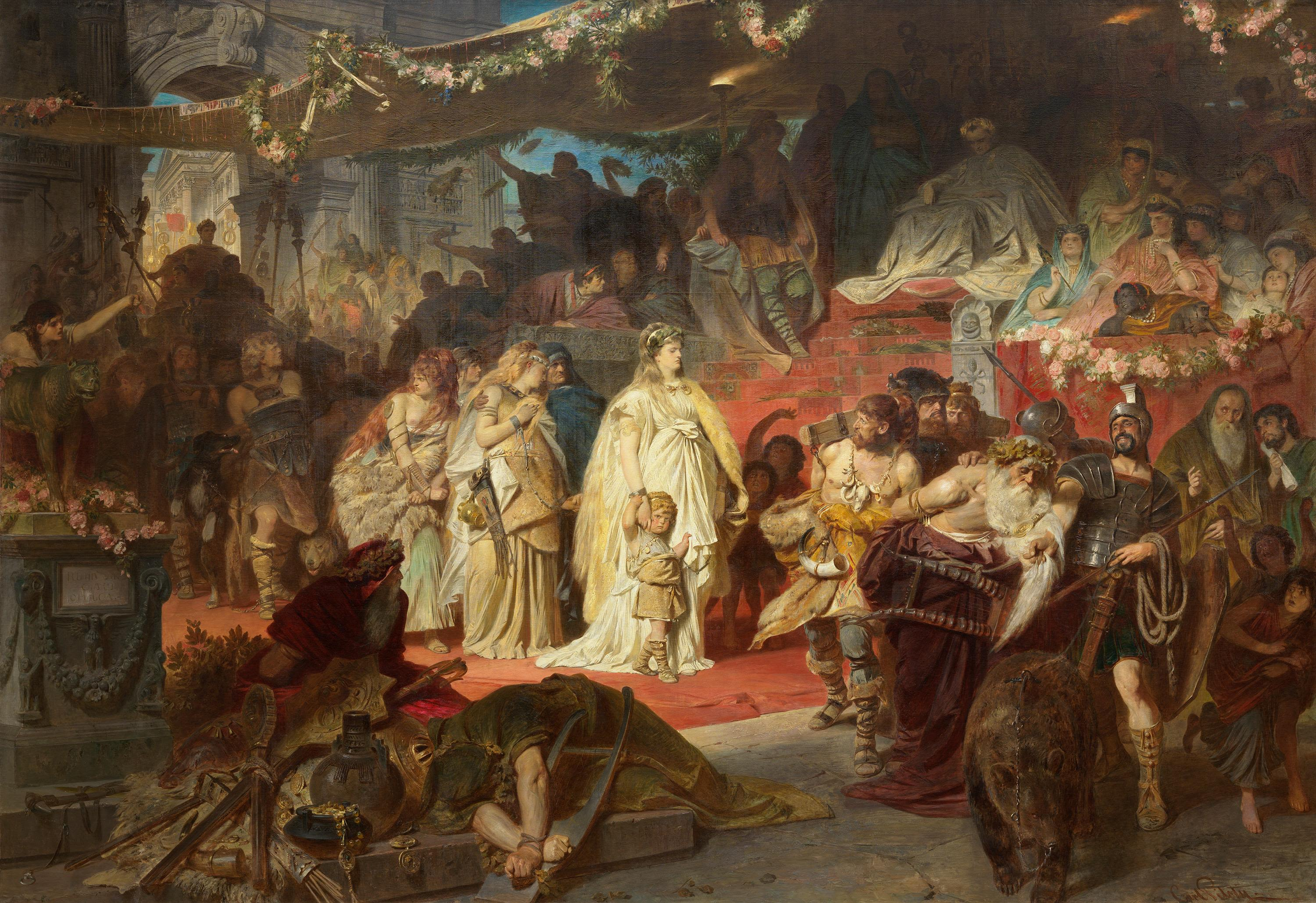
Thusnelda at the Triumph of Germanicus, by Karl von Piloty, 1873

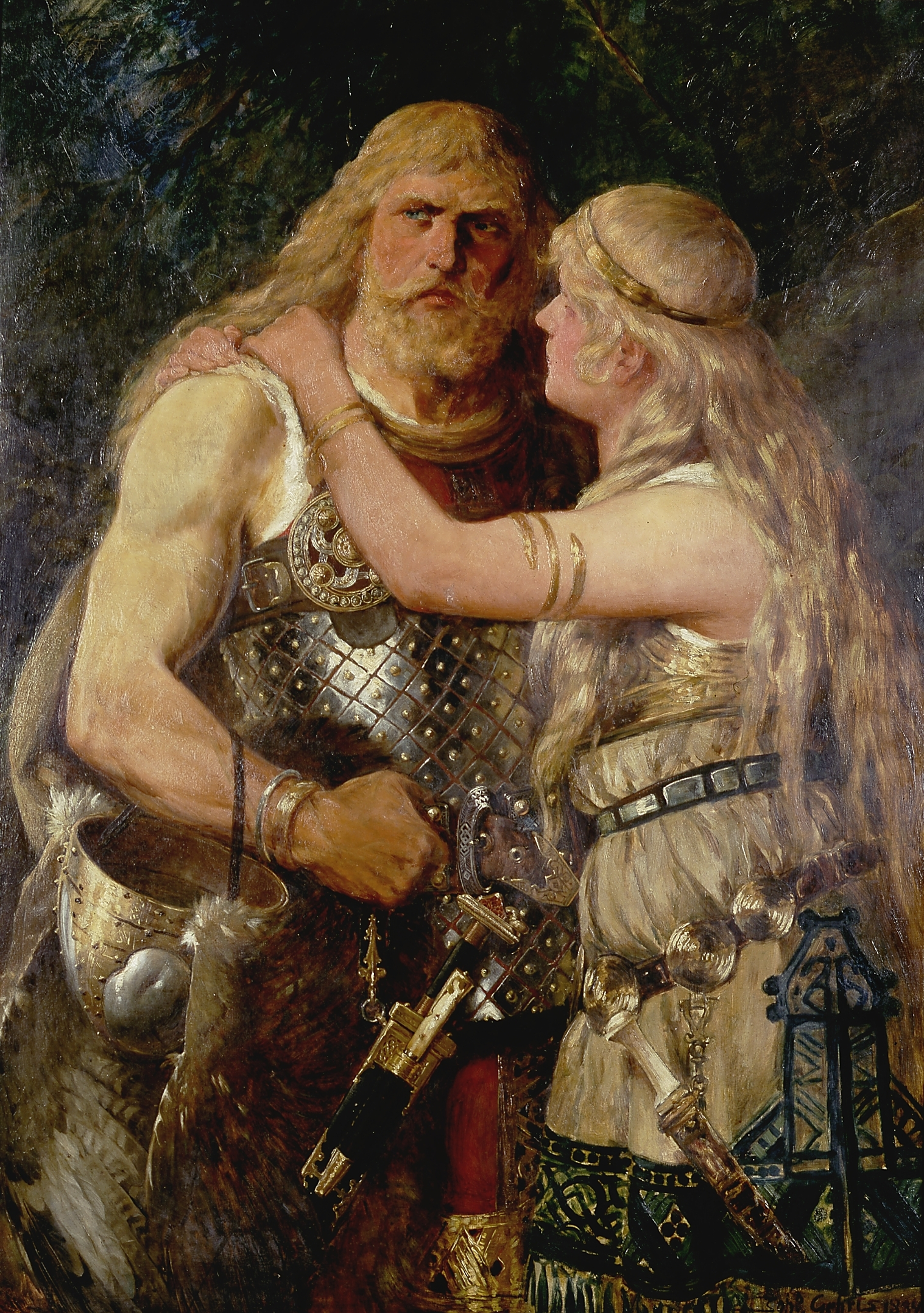
Arminius says goodbye to Thusnelda, Johannes Gehrts (1884)

Thusnelda (/ðʌsˈnɛldə/; c. 10 BC – after AD 17) was a Germanic Cheruscan noblewoman who was captured by the Roman general Germanicus during his invasion of Germania. She was the wife of Arminius. Tacitus and Strabo cite her capture as evidence of both the firmness and restraint of Roman arms.

== Biography ==
Thusnelda was the daughter of the pro-Roman Cheruscan prince Segestes. In 9 AD, Arminius, Thusnelda's future husband, who had been given by his father to the Romans as a child and raised as a Roman military commander serving under Publius Quinctilius Varus, switched sides to the Germans, and led a coalition of Germanic tribes that defeated the legions of Varus at the Battle of the Teutoburg Forest. The conflict between the Roman Empire and the Germanic tribes continued after the Battle of the Teutoburg Forest, and Arminius abducted Thusnelda circa 14 AD, likely as a result of a dispute with her pro-Roman father, according to Tacitus.

In May 15 AD, Thusnelda was captured by Germanicus, who commanded the invasion of Germania. She was pregnant and staying with her father, who had seized her from Arminius at some point. It was Segestes who delivered her to Germanicus, after the latter saved the former by driving off Arminius' forces, who had besieged Segestes. Arminius grieved his loss of Thusnelda deeply and did not marry again. According to Tacitus, Arminius was "driven to frenzy" by the loss of his wife.

During her captivity, Thusnelda gave birth to her and Arminius' only child, Thumelicus. At the Battle of the Weser River, Arminius engaged in a famous dispute with his brother Flavus, who was still serving in the Roman army. Flavus informed Arminius that Thusnelda was being well-treated — as, he claimed, was typical of Rome. On May 26, 17 AD, Thusnelda and her son Thumelicus were displayed as prized trophies of the triumph granted to Germanicus. During the triumphal parade, her father watched from the stands, Tacitus suggests with mixed feelings. Tacitus himself felt her display as evidence of Roman victory in Germania was premature, as Arminius had evaded capture and fighting was continuing.

Tacitus wrote that he would report on Thumelicus' fate "at the proper time" — i.e., when he discussed the year in question in his chronicle. The main gap in the text of the Annals is for 30 and 31 AD, so it could be that Thumelicus died then, aged 15 or 16.

Details of Thusnelda's life after the triumph of 17 AD and her date of death are unknown.

== In popular culture ==
Thusnelda (under the name of Rosmonda) and other figures of the conflict between Arminius and Germanicus were immortalized by the Italian composer Nicola Porpora in his opera Germanico in Germania.

In the 2020 German Netflix series Barbarians, Thusnelda is played by German actress Jeanne Goursaud.

== See also ==
- Fflur
- 219 Thusnelda
