= Jeffrey Cole =

American anthropologist

Jeffrey E. Cole is an American anthropologist. He is professor of anthropology, chairman of the Department of Anthropology and dean at Connecticut College, and served as president of the Society for the Anthropology of Europe of the American Anthropological Association from 2012 to 2014. Cole is an expert on race and ethnicity in Europe, a subject on which he has written and edited numerous books and articles.

== Biography ==
Jeffrey Cole received his B.A. from Portland State University, his Cand. Mag from the University of Oslo and his Ph.D. from the Graduate Center of the City University of New York. Cole subsequently served for 15 years on the faculty of Dowling College. Since 2008 he has been professor of anthropology and chair of the Department of Anthropology at Connecticut College. He was made Associate Dean at Connecticut College in 2015, and since July 1, 2018, he has been Dean of the Faculty at Connecticut College since July 1, 2018.

Cole is an expert on race and ethnicity in Europe, a subject on which he has authored numerous books and articles. He has co-edited two special issues of the Journal of Modern Italian Studies, and was the editor of Ethnic Groups of Europe (2011), a one-volume encyclopedia. In the latter work, Cole supervised the work of more than 80 scholars from throughout the world.

Cole is a fellow of the Goodwin-Niering Center for the Environment (GNCE). He is the recipient of grants and awards from the National Science Foundation, Wenner-Gren, the Fulbright Program, and the Harry Frank Guggenheim Foundation. From 2012 to 2014, Cole was president of the Society for the Anthropology of Europe, a section of the American Anthropological Association. He has supervised studies and has supervised individual studies and honors theses conducted by students in the GNCE and the Toor Cummings Center for International Studies and the Liberal Arts (CISLA).

Cole is a resident of Mystic, Connecticut, where he lives with his spouse Sally Booth.

== Selected bibliography ==
- A New Racism in Europe: A Sicilian Ethnography, 1997
- Dirty Work: Immigrants in Domestic Service, Agriculture, and Prostitution in Sicily, 2007
- Ethnic Groups of Europe, 2011
