= Thumelicus =

Son of Arminius in the Roman Empire

- Born: 15 AD; Unknown
- Died: c. 30–31 AD (aged 14–16); Possibly Roman Empire
- Father: Arminius
- Mother: Thusnelda

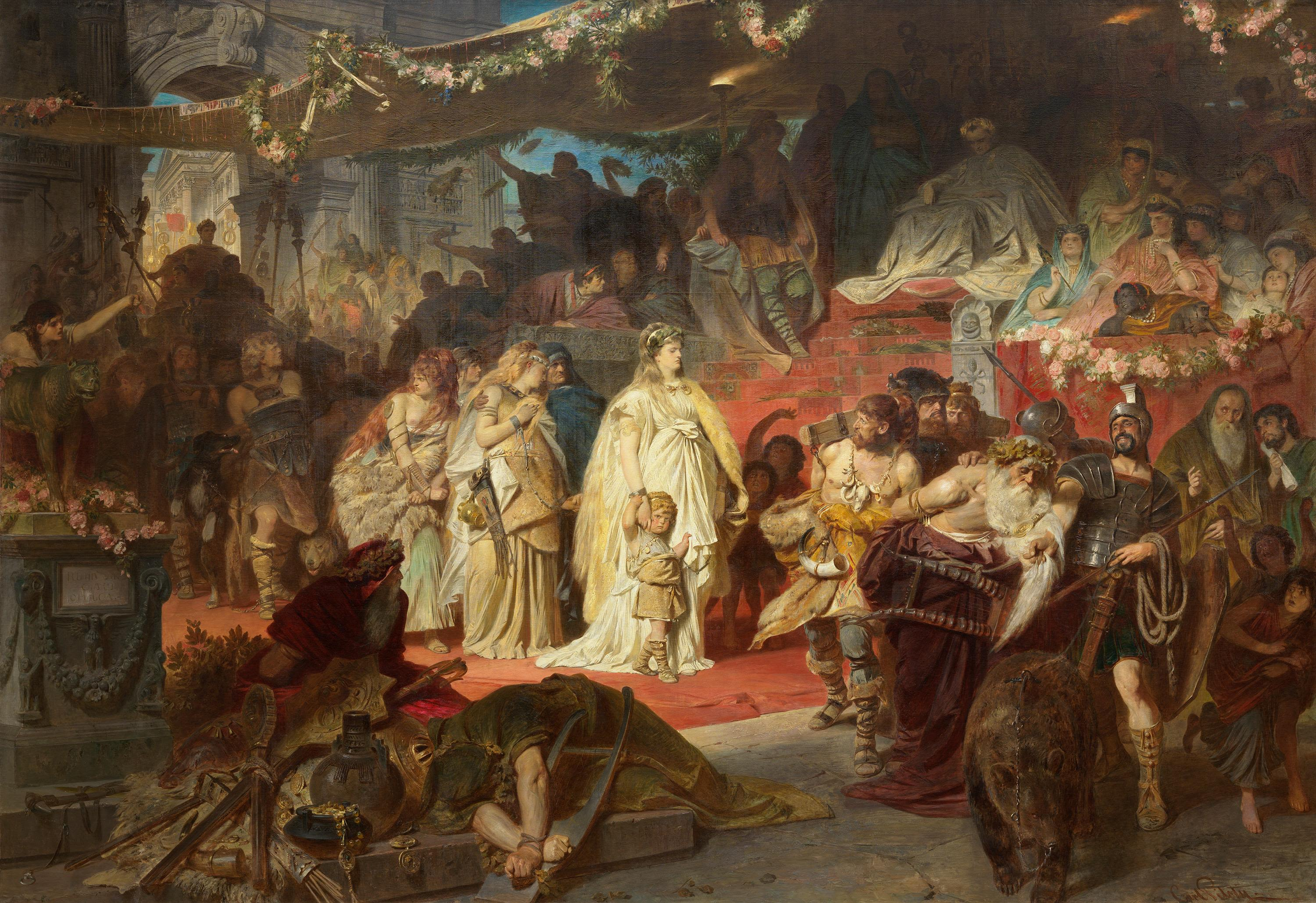
Thusnelda at the Triumph of Germanicus, by Karl von Piloty, 1873. The infant Thumelicus is depicted standing next to his mother.

Thumelicus (born AD 15; died before AD 47, probably in 30 or 31) was the only son of the Cherusci leader Arminius and his wife Thusnelda, daughter of the pro-Roman tribal leader Segestes.

In May 15 AD, Arminius besieged Segestes at his stronghold, where Thusnelda, then pregnant, was staying. The Roman commander, Germanicus, a nephew of Emperor Tiberius, broke through the siege and took her prisoner. Thusnelda and the then three years old Thumelicus were presented in Rome in the Triumph Germanicus was allowed to celebrate in May 17 AD (but Strabo who may have been in Rome at the times draws attention to the fact that her husband Arminius, the victor at Teutoburg Forest, had not been captured and the war, itself, had not been won). Afterwards, the captives were spared, but were sent to exile in Ravenna, where Thumelicus was raised.

Tacitus promised to recount his fate "at the proper time" — that is, when his Annals treat the year in question. But there is no further mention in the extant copy, only Tacitus' earlier comment that Thumelicus "ran into derision". A major gap exists for 30 and 31 AD, however, so it could be that Thumelicus died even earlier, as his cousin Italicus in 47 AD became ruler of the Cherusci, being the only member of the Royal House still alive.
