= Königshausen & Neumann =

Königshausen & Neumann is a publisher based in Würzburg, Germany. The publishing house was founded in 1979 by Johannes Königshausen and Thomas Neumann. It focuses on the humanities and publishes book titles in the field of philosophy, literature, psychology, society and culture. Königshausen & Neumann has its own print shop. The publishing house is a member of the Börsenverein des Deutschen Buchhandels.

In the area of academic publishing, Königshausen & Neumann also publishes two journals: the Wagnerspectrum, which appears twice yearly, devoted to Richard Wagner scholarship, as well as the quarterly Zeitschrift für Anglistik und Amerikanistik (ZAA) (trans: "Journal of British and American Studies").
