= Arminius =

Germanic Cherusci chieftain (18/17 BC – AD 21)

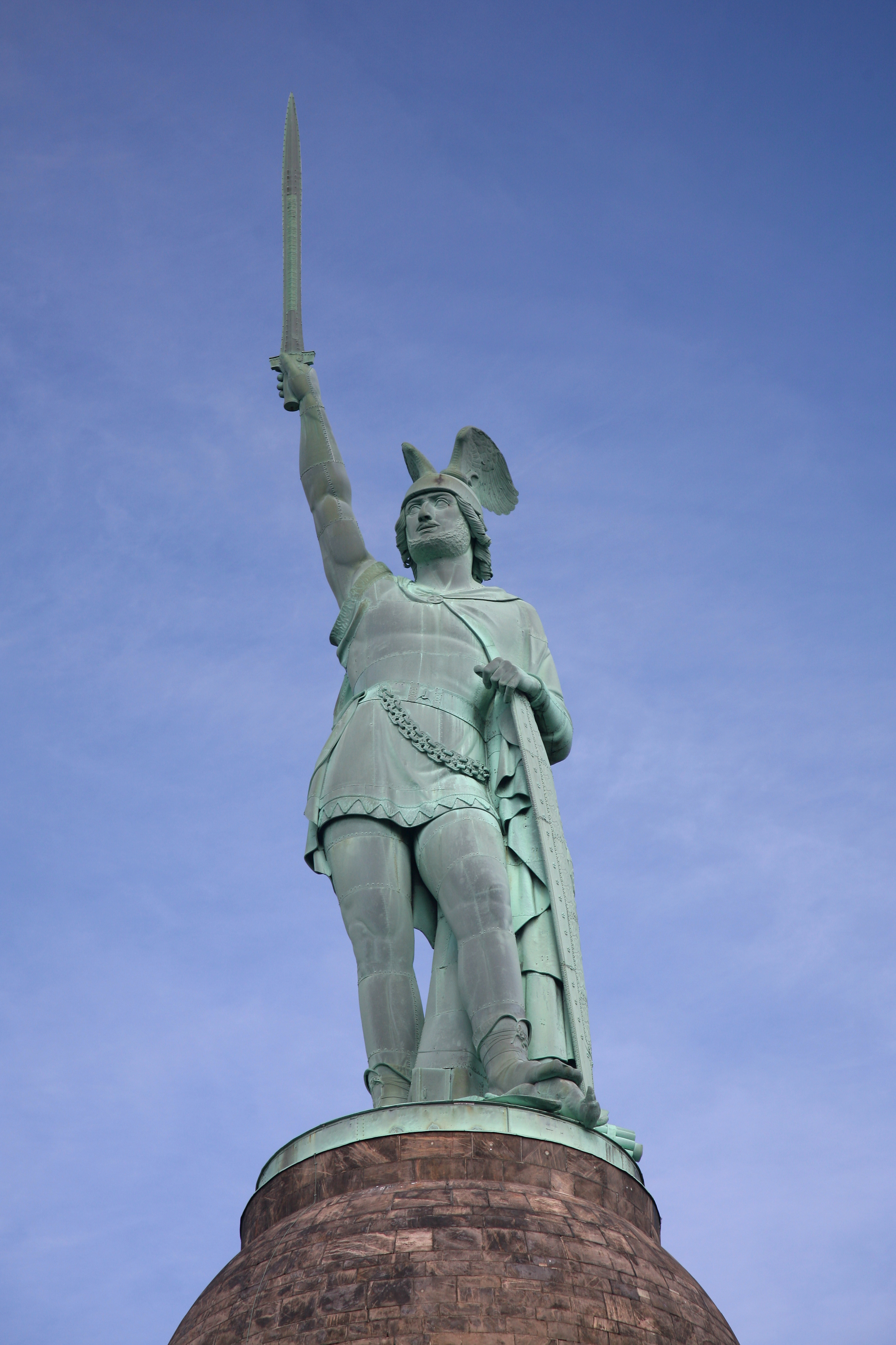
- Statue of Arminius at the Hermannsdenkmal monument

Prince and chieftain of the Cherusci tribe
- Predecessor: Segimer
- Successor: Italicus
- Born: 18/17 BC; Germania
- Died: AD 21 (aged 37–38); Germania
- Spouse: Thusnelda
- Issue: Thumelicus
Names
- Arminius (His original Germanic name is unknown, although it is thought “Arminius” could be a Romanization of “Erminaz”; modern German variants of “Arminius”, e.g. Hermann and Armin, are back-formations.)
- Father: Segimer
- Religion: Germanic paganism
- Occupation: Chieftain, auxilia officer

Arminius (/ɑːrˈmɪniəs/; 18/17 BC–AD 21) was a Germanic chieftain of the Germanic Cherusci tribe. He is best known for commanding an alliance of Germanic tribes at the Battle of the Teutoburg Forest in AD 9, in which three Roman legions under the command of general and governor Publius Quinctilius Varus were destroyed. His victory at Teutoburg Forest precipitated the Roman Empire's permanent strategic withdrawal and the deprovincialization of Germania Magna, and modern historians regard it as one of Imperial Rome's greatest defeats. As it prevented the Romanization of Germanic peoples east of the Rhine, it has also been considered one of the most decisive battles in history and a turning point in human history.

Born a prince of the Cherusci tribe, Arminius was part of the Roman-friendly faction of the tribe. He learned Latin and served in the Roman military, which gained him Roman citizenship, and the rank of eques. After serving with distinction in the Great Illyrian Revolt, he was sent to Germania to aid the local governor Publius Quinctilius Varus in completing the Roman conquest of the Germanic tribes. While in this capacity, Arminius secretly plotted a Germanic revolt against Roman rule, which culminated in the ambush and destruction of three Roman legions in the Teutoburg Forest.

In the aftermath of the battle, Arminius fought retaliatory invasions by Roman general Germanicus in the battles of Pontes Longi, Idistaviso, and Angrivarian Wall, and defeated a rival, the Marcomanni king Maroboduus. Arminius sought to become a king and was assassinated in 21. He was remembered in Germanic legends for generations afterward. Roman historian Tacitus designated Arminius as the liberator of the Germanic tribes and commended him for having fought the Roman Empire to a standstill at the peak of its power.

During the unification of Germany in the 19th century, Arminius was hailed by German nationalists as a symbol of German unity and freedom. Following World War II, however, Arminius' significance diminished in Germany due to the rise of anti-militarism, pacifism, and anti-nationalism. The 2,000th anniversary of his victory at the Teutoburg Forest was only lightly commemorated in Germany.

== Name ==
The etymology of the Latin name Arminius is unknown, and confusion is further created by recent scholars, who alternately referred to him as Armenus. In his History, Marcus Velleius Paterculus calls him "Arminius, the son of Sigimer, a prince of the nation", and states he "attained the dignity of equestrian rank". Due to Roman naming conventions of the time, Arminius likely is an adopted name granted to him upon citizenship, or in any case, not his Germanic name. The name instead appears to be ultimately of Etruscan origin, appearing as armne and armni on inscriptions found at Volaterrae.

According to another theory, that name was given to Arminius for his service in Armenia. Scholars note that the name Arme(i)nius (meaning literally "from Armenia") was not uncommon in Latin onomastics and could serve as both a cognomen and a nomen. It appears in several contexts of the Roman West without proven links to Armenia and may overlap with or represent a variant of Arminius, the cognomen of the Cheruscan chieftain. A senatorial family bore the nomen, the most notable member being the consul of 244, Ti. Pollenius Armenius Peregrinus. Modern scholarship, however, regards this as Italic, possibly Etruscan, rather than Armenian in origin. Thus bearers of the name cannot automatically be connected with Armenian provenance.

In the 16th century Arminius also came to be referred to as Hermann in German, possibly first by Martin Luther. In German Arminius was traditionally referred to as Hermann der Cherusker ("Hermann the Cheruscan") or Hermann der Cheruskerfürst ("Hermann the Cheruscan Prince"). In Old High German, a language which had not yet developed during the time of Arminius, heri meant "army" and man meant "man", resulting in the name Hermann meaning "army/war leader". While bearing a superficial resemblance to the name Arminius they are etymologically unrelated, as Arminius (if assumed to represent a Latinization of a Germanic name, which is not uncontested) would most likely derive from the Germanic word ermunaz, meaning "huge/great". This has also led to his English nickname "Herman the German".

== Early life and Roman military service ==
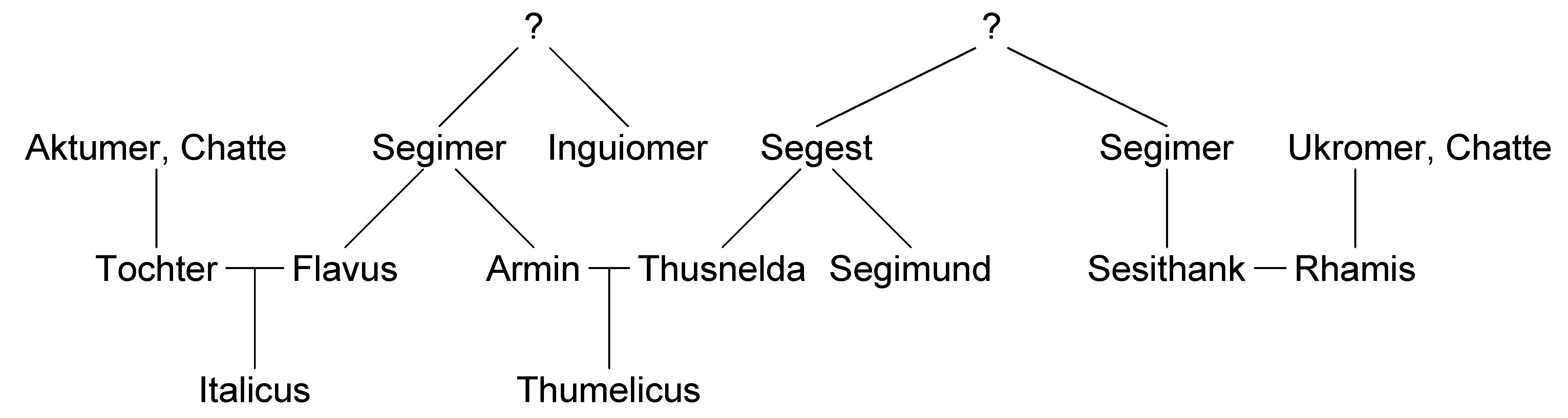
Relatives of Arminius

Born in 18 or 17 BC in Germania, Arminius was the son of the Cheruscan chief Segimerus (proto-Germanic: Sigimariz; Old English: Sigemær), who was allied with Rome.

Arminius learned to speak Latin and joined the Roman military with his younger brother Flavus. He served in the Roman army between AD 1 and 6, and received a military education, as well as Roman citizenship and the status of eques before returning to Germania. These experiences gave him knowledge of Roman politics and military tactics, which allowed him to anticipate enemy battle maneuvers successfully during his later campaigns against the Roman army.

== Return to Germania ==
Magna Germania in AD 9: The yellow legend represents the areas controlled by the Roman Republic in 31 BC, the shades of green represent gradually conquered territories under the reign of Augustus, and pink areas on the map represent tributary tribes.

Around AD 4, Arminius assumed command of a Cheruscan detachment of Roman auxiliary forces, probably while fighting in the Pannonian wars on the Balkan peninsula. He returned to northern Germania in AD 7 or 8, where the Roman Empire had established secure control of the territories just east of the Rhine, along the Lippe and Main Rivers, and was now seeking to extend its hegemony eastward to the Weser and Elbe Rivers, under Publius Quinctilius Varus, a high-ranking administrative official appointed by Augustus as governor. Arminius began plotting to unite various Germanic tribes to thwart Roman efforts to incorporate their lands into the empire. This proved a difficult task, as the tribes were strongly independent, and many were traditionally enemies of each other.

Between AD 6 and 9, the Romans were forced to move eight legions, of the 11 present in Germania east of the Rhine, to crush a rebellion in the Balkans, leaving Varus with only three legions to face the Germans. This was still 18,000 troops, or 6,000 men per legion. An additional two legions, under the command of Lucius Nonius Asprenas, were stationed in Moguntiacum. Arminius saw this as the perfect opportunity to defeat Varus.

== Anti-Roman uprising ==
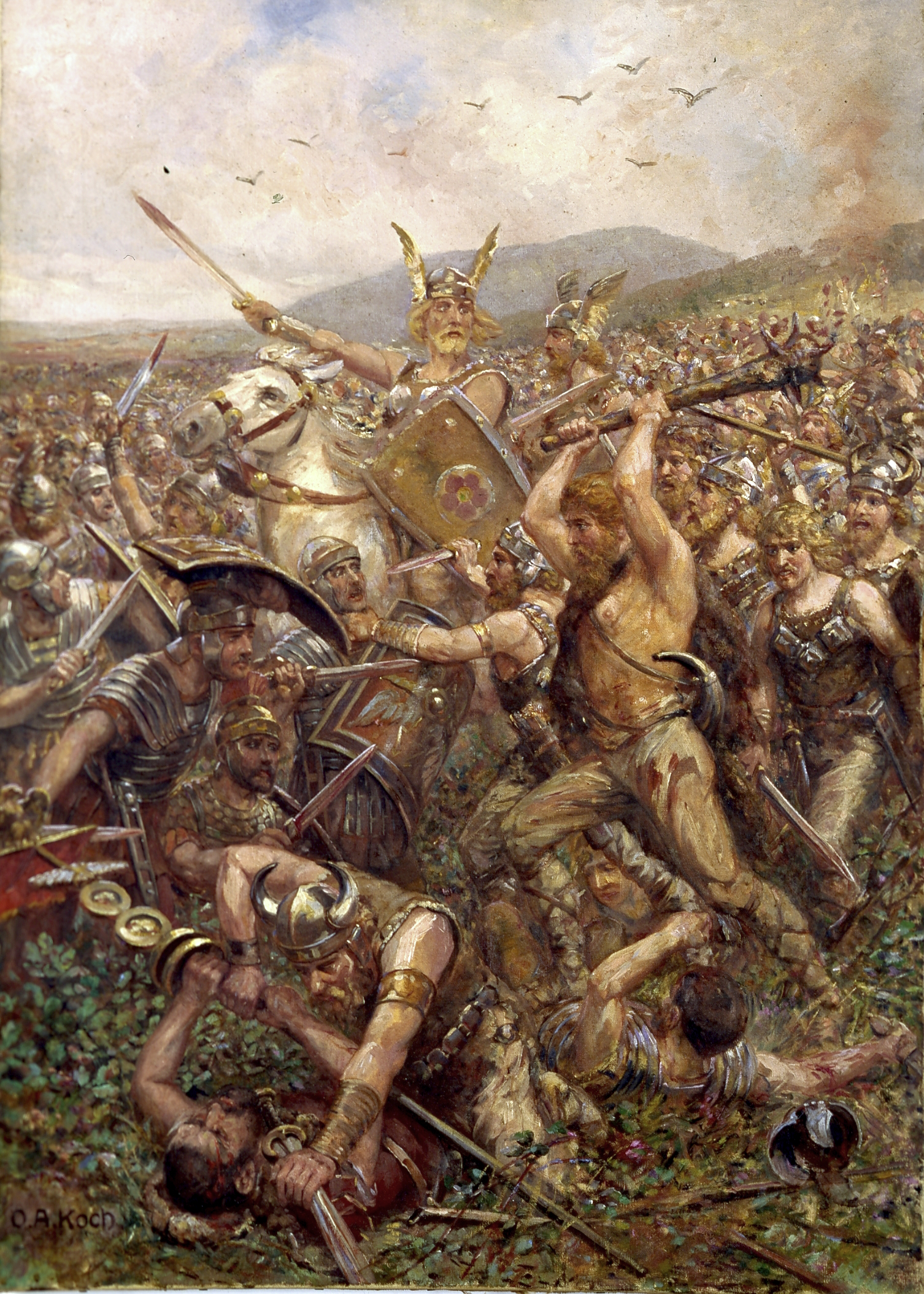
Varusschlacht, Otto Albert Koch (1909)

In the autumn of AD 9, the 25-year-old Arminius brought to Varus a false report of rebellion in northern Germany. He persuaded Varus to divert the three legions under his command (composed of the 17th, 18th, and 19th legions, plus three cavalry detachments and six cohorts of auxiliaries), which were at the time marching to winter quarters, to suppress the rebellion. Varus and his legions marched right into the trap that Arminius had set for them near Kalkriese. Arminius' tribe, the Cherusci, and their allies the Marsi, Chatti, Bructeri, Chauci, and Sicambri (five out of at least fifty Germanic tribes at the time) ambushed and annihilated Varus' entire army, totaling over 20,000 men, as it marched along a narrow road through a dense forest. Recent archaeological finds show the long-debated location of the three-day battle was almost certainly near Kalkriese Hill, about 20 kilometres (12 mi) north of present-day Osnabrück. When defeat was certain, Varus committed suicide by falling upon his sword. The battle was one of the most devastating defeats Rome suffered in its history. Arminius' success in destroying three entire legions and driving the Romans out of Germany marked a high point of Germanic power for centuries. Roman attempts to reconquer Germania failed, although they did eventually manage to break Arminius' carefully coordinated alliance.

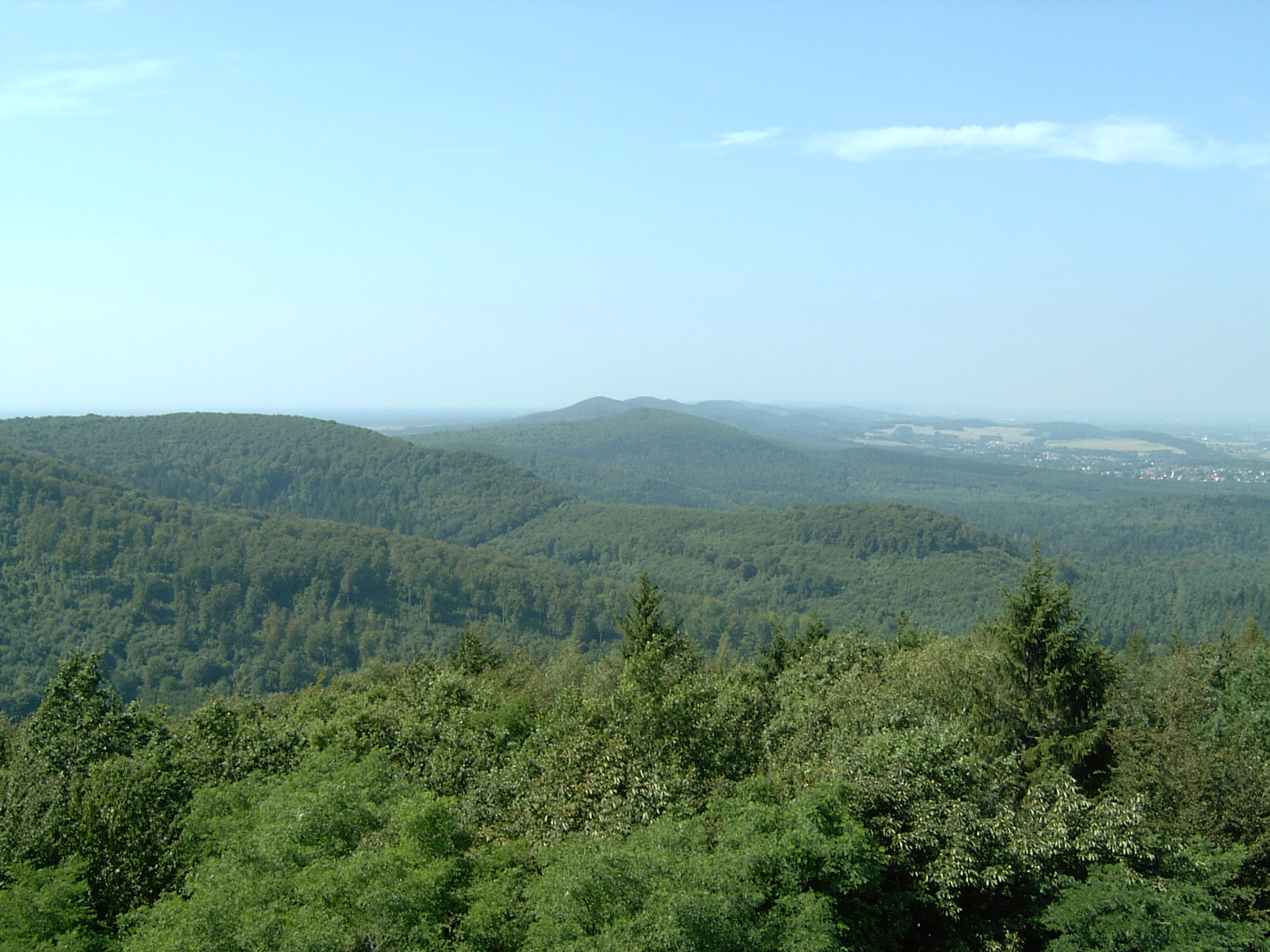
View over the Teutoburg Forest

After the battle, the Germans quickly annihilated every trace of Roman presence east of the Rhine. Roman settlements such as the Waldgirmes Forum were abandoned. The vastly outnumbered Roman garrison of Aliso (present-day Haltern am See), under the command of the prefect Lucius Cedicius, inflicted heavy losses on the Germans before retreating into Gaul, resisting long enough for Lucius Nonius Asprenas to organize the Roman defense on the Rhine and Tiberius to arrive with a new army. This prevented Arminius from crossing the Rhine and invading Gaul.

== Marriage ==
At some point after the battle, Arminius married a Germanic princess named Thusnelda. Her father was the Cheruscan prince Segestes, who was pro-Roman, but Arminius abducted and then impregnated Thusnelda c. AD 14. This elopement was likely a result of a dispute between Arminius and Segestes, who was against their relationship. In May of 15, Roman general Germanicus captured Thusnelda. At the point of her capture, she was pregnant and living with her father, who had taken her back. Arminius deeply grieved the capture of Thusnelda and did not marry again. Tacitus recorded that Arminius was "driven to frenzy" by the loss of his beloved wife. Tacitus states in the Annals:

Arminius, with his naturally furious temper, was driven to frenzy by the seizure of his wife and the foredooming to slavery of his wife's unborn child. He flew hither and thither among the Cherusci, demanding "war against Segestes, war against Cæsar." And he refrained not from taunts.

Thusnelda gave birth to a son named Thumelicus, who grew up in Roman captivity. Tacitus describes him as having an unusual story, which he promises to tell in his later writings, but these writings have never been found.

== Roman retribution and death ==
Between 14 and 16, Germanicus led punitive operations into Germany, fighting Arminius to a draw in the Battle at Pontes Longi and twice defeating him (according to Tacitus): first in the Battle of Idistaviso and later at the Battle of the Angrivarian Wall. In 15, Roman troops managed to recapture one of the three legionary eagles lost in the Battle of the Teutoburg Forest. In 16, a second eagle was retrieved. Tiberius denied the request of Germanicus to launch an additional campaign for 17, but decided the frontier with Germania would stand at the River Rhine. Instead he offered Germanicus the honor of a triumph for his two victories. The third Roman eagle was recovered in 41 by Publius Gabinius, under the emperor Claudius. Arminius also faced opposition from his father-in-law and other pro-Roman Germanic leaders. His brother Flavus, who had been raised alongside him in Rome, remained loyal to the Roman Empire and fought under Germanicus against Arminius at the Battle of Idistaviso. With the end of the Roman threat, a war broke out between Arminius and Marbod, king of the Marcomanni. It ended with Marbod fleeing to Ravenna and Roman protection, but Arminius failed to break into the "natural fortification" of Bohemia, and the war ended in stalemate. In 19 Germanicus died in Antioch under circumstances that led many to believe he had been poisoned by his opponents. Arminius died two years later in 21, murdered by opponents within his own tribe, who felt that he was becoming too powerful. Tiberius allegedly had refused an earlier offer from a Chatti nobleman to poison Arminius: "It was not by secret treachery, but openly and by arms that the people of Rome avenged themselves on their enemies."

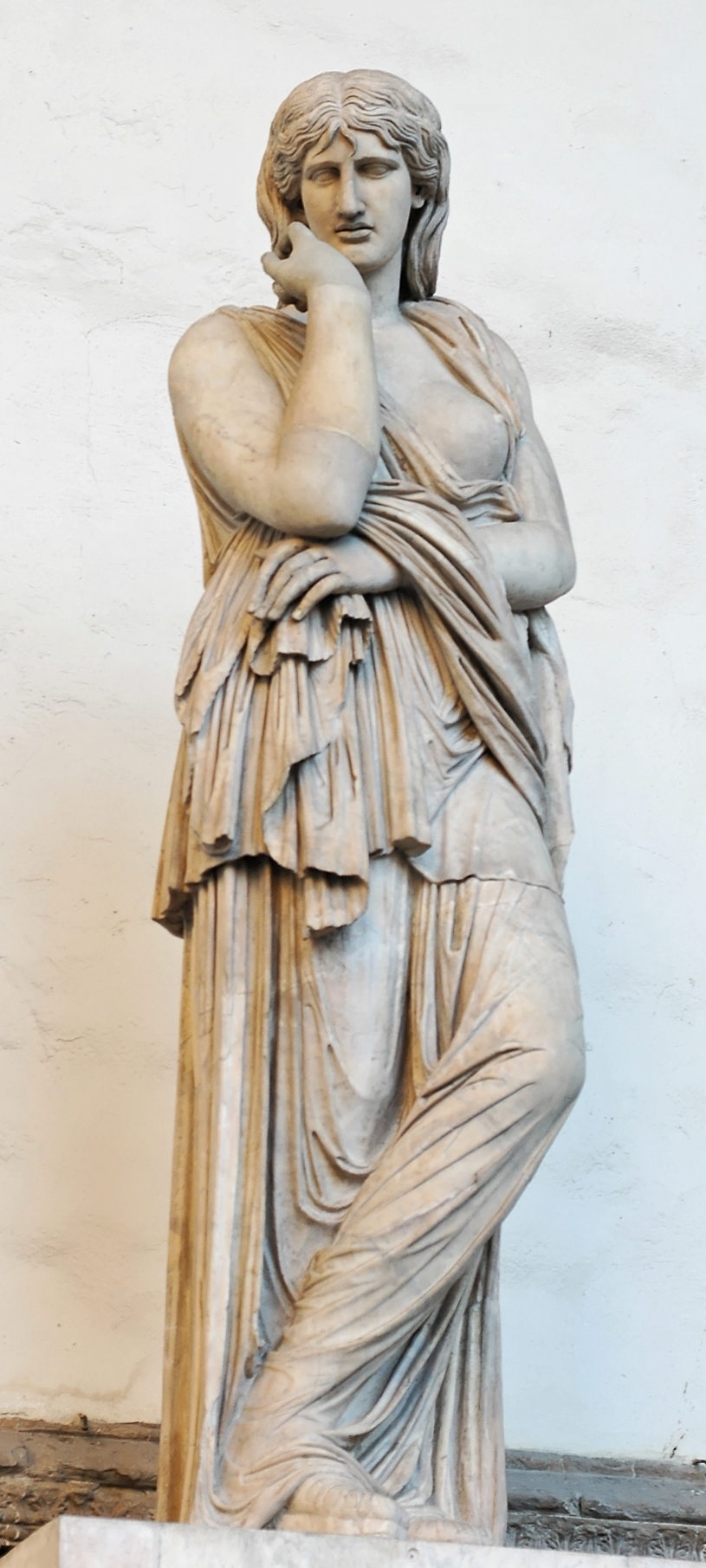
Statue of Thusnelda in Loggia dei Lanzi. Created in second century AD with modern restorations.

== Legacy and influence ==
Arminius' victory against the Roman legions in the Teutoburg Forest had a far-reaching effect on the subsequent history of both the ancient Germanic peoples and on the Roman Empire. The Romans made no further concerted efforts to conquer and permanently hold Germania beyond the Rhine and the Agri Decumates. Numerous modern historians have regarded Arminius' victory as one of the most decisive battles in history, with some calling it "Rome's greatest defeat".

=== Roman imperial expansion ===
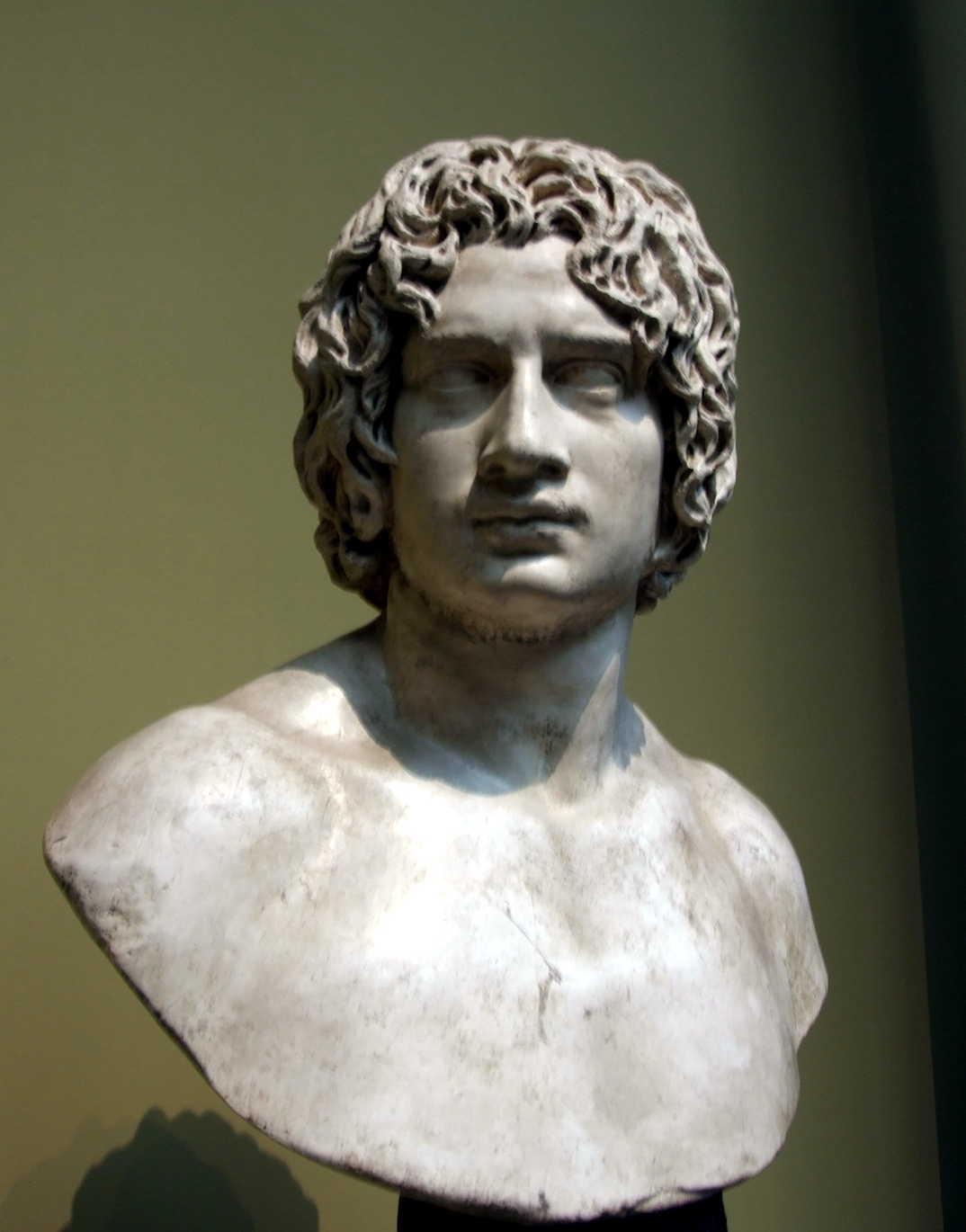
A Roman sculpture of a young man, which is sometimes identified as Arminius

In the accounts of his Roman enemies, Arminius is highly regarded for his military leadership and as a defender of the liberty of his people. Based on these records, the story of Arminius was revived in the 16th century with the recovery of the histories of Tacitus, who wrote in his Annales II, 88:

Arminius, without doubt Germania's liberator, who challenged the Roman people not in its beginnings like other kings and leaders, but in the peak of its empire; in battles with changing success, undefeated in the war.

Arminius was not the only reason for Rome's change of policy towards Germania. Politics also played a factor; emperors found they could rarely trust a large army to a potential rival, though Augustus had enough loyal family members to wage his wars. Also, Augustus, in his 40-year reign, had annexed many territories still at the beginning of the process of Romanization. Tiberius, who succeeded Augustus in AD 14, decided that Germania was a far less developed land, possessing few villages and only a small food surplus, so was not then important to Rome. Conquering Germania would require a commitment too burdensome for the imperial finances and an excessive expenditure of military force.

Modern scholars have pointed out that the Rhine was a more practical boundary for the Roman Empire than any other river in Germania. Armies on the Rhine could be supplied from the Mediterranean Sea via the Rhône, Saône, and Mosel, with only a brief area of portage. Armies on the Elbe, however, would have to have been supplied by extensive overland routes or by ships travelling the hazardous Atlantic. Economically, the Rhine already had towns and sizable villages at the time of the Gallic conquest. The Rhine was significantly more accessible from Rome and better equipped to supply sizable garrisons than the regions beyond.

Rome chose no longer to rule directly in Germania east of the Rhine and north of the Danube, instead preferring to exert indirect influence through the tactics of using divide and rule and the appointing of client kings, which were cheaper than military campaigns. Italicus, nephew of Arminius, was appointed king of the Cherusci; Vangio and Sido became vassal princes of the powerful Suebi, etc. Only when indirect methods proved insufficient to control the Germanic tribes beyond the Rhine did Roman emperors occasionally lead devastating punitive campaigns deep into Germania. One of them, led by the Roman emperor Maximinus Thrax, resulted in a Roman victory in 235 at the Battle at the Harzhorn Hill, located in the modern German state of Lower Saxony, east of the Weser River, between the towns of Kalefeld and Bad Gandersheim.

=== Germanic sagas ===
In the early 19th century, attempts were made to show that the story of Arminius and his victory may have lived on in the Old Norse sagas, in the form of the dragon slayer Sigurd of the Völsunga saga and the Nibelungenlied. An Icelandic account states that Sigurd "slew the dragon" in the Gnitaheidr—today the suburb Knetterheide of the city of Bad Salzuflen, located at a strategic site on the River Werre, which could very well have been the point of departure of Varus' legions on their way to their doom in the Teutoburg Forest. One of the foremost Scandinavian scholars of the 19th century, Guðbrandur Vigfússon, identified Sigurd as Arminius. This educated guess was also picked up by Otto Höfler, who was a prominent Nazi academic during World War II. Other scholars have described attempts to connect Arminius with Sigurd as improbable and unfounded.

=== German nationalism ===
After Tacitus' Annals were rediscovered by Renaissance humanists and first published during the Gutenberg Revolution of the 15th century, Arminius became an important symbol of German national identity, as a figure who successfully opposed colonialism and prevented the Romanization of his people by outgeneraling and defeating one of the world's first superpowers. Indeed, learning of his victory over the Roman army was especially important to German Renaissance humanists, as the Renaissance only reached the Holy Roman Empire much later than southern Europe, and German humanists were widely looked down upon by their Italian colleagues. The first literary adaptation of the Arminius story came in 1520 with Ulrich von Hutten's Latin dialogue Arminius, which inserts the Germanic leader into a reimagining of the 12th chapter of Lucian's satirical Dialogues of the Dead; a debate between Alexander the Great, Hannibal, and Scipio Africanus before the underworld judgment seat of Minos over who most deserves the position of history's greatest general and military strategist. Arminius argues his own claim and calls upon Tacitus to bear witness and ultimately wins the case and the eloquent praise of Minos.

This version influenced later adaptations of the story and reflected a wide interest in Arminius during the years of the German Reformation; the name Arminius was interpreted as reflecting the name Hermann by Martin Luther, who saw Arminius as a symbol of his religious followers among the German people and their resistance to the Papacy and the Roman Catholic Church.

During the military occupation of the German States, first by the French Revolutionary Army and then by the French Imperial Army of Napoleon Bonaparte, Hermann der Cheruskerfürst once again became a national icon and a martyr within both German Romanticism and the anti-Colonialist romantic nationalism fueled by the Napoleonic Wars, which are still termed in Germany the Wars of Liberation. This may particularly be seen as in Caspar David Friedrich's 1812 painting The Tombs of the Old Heroes. During the unification of Germany in the 19th century, Arminius was hailed as a symbol of German unity and liberation.

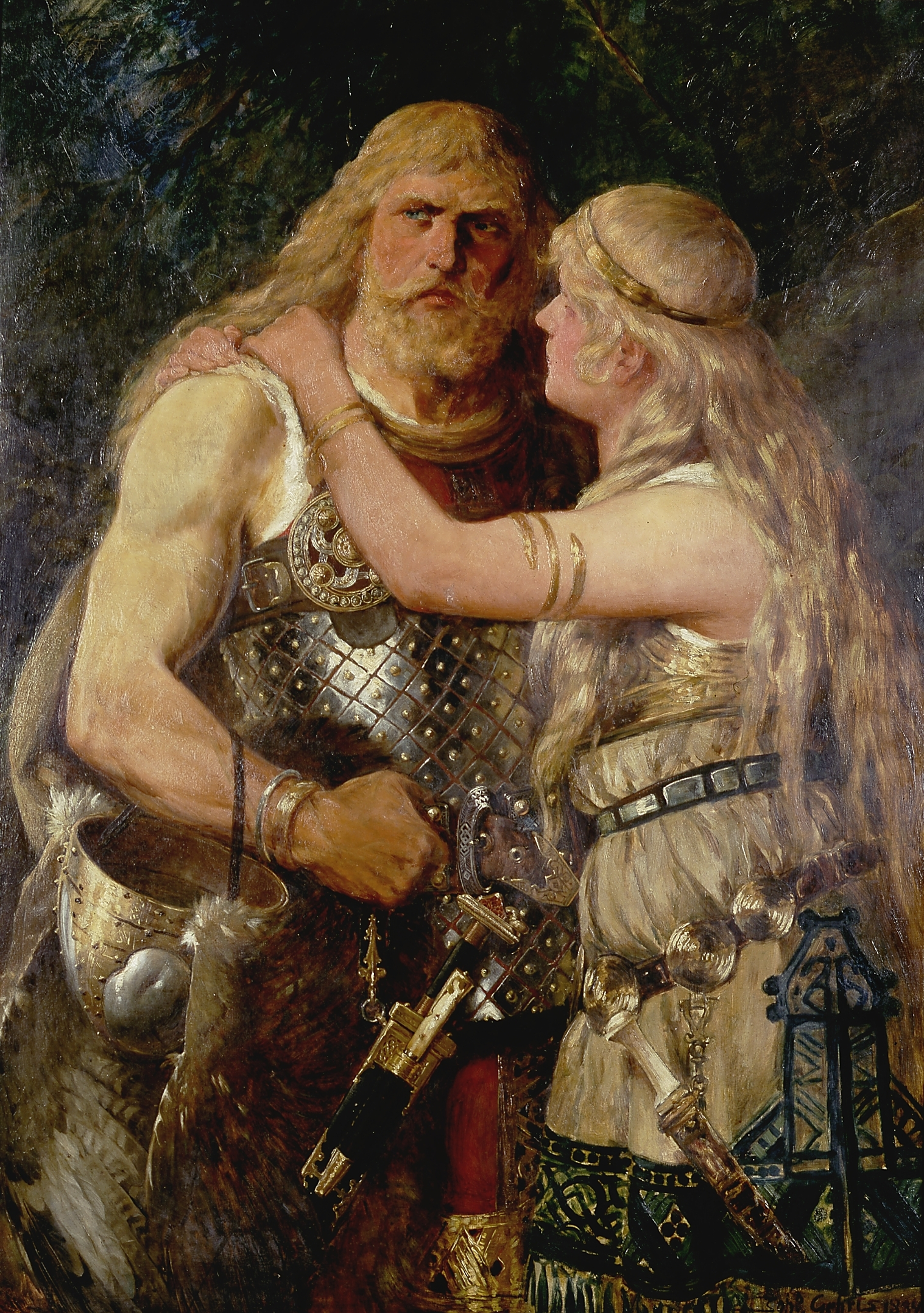
Arminius says goodbye to Thusnelda, Johannes Gehrts (1884)

In 1808, Heinrich von Kleist wrote the play Die Hermannsschlacht, but with Napoleon's victory at Wagram, it remained in manuscript, being published in 1821 and not staged until 1860. The play has been revived repeatedly at moments of national crisis and was especially used as propaganda in Nazi Germany.

In 1838, construction was started on a massive statue of Arminius, known as the Hermannsdenkmal, on a hill near Detmold in the Teutoburg Forest; it was finally completed and dedicated during the early years of the Second German Empire in the wake of the German victory over France in the Franco-Prussian War of 1870–1871. The monument has been a major tourist attraction ever since, as has the Hermann Heights Monument, a similar statue erected in New Ulm, Minnesota, in the United States in 1897. The Hermann Heights monument was erected by the Sons of Hermann, a fraternal organization formed in New York City by German Americans as a means of self-protection against anti-German sentiment and discrimination in 1840 and that flourished during the 19th century in American cities and rural areas with large populations speaking the German language in the United States. Hermann, Missouri, a town on the Missouri River founded in the 1830s and incorporated in 1845, was also named for Arminius.

Following the defeat of Nazi Germany in 1945, Arminius became lesser known among West Germans, and the educational system shied away from teaching about his life due to a sense of guilt and shame, rooted in both the Holocaust and Nazi war crimes, related to any form of German nationalism. There was, however, a radically different practice in East Germany. Particularly during the Cold War, Arminius and his warriors were anachronistically reinterpreted quite similarly to the slave revolt led by Spartacus in the Marxist-Leninist official history promoted by the State; as an early socialist revolution and as revolutionary terror against the "Roman slaveholder society" (Sklavenhaltergesellschaft). The legacy of Arminius and his followers was further reinterpreted as symbolic of the allegedly "peace-loving" Warsaw Pact countries, while Imperial Rome was made into a symbol of the capitalist and allegedly Fascistic United States and the NATO military alliance, which were cast as the new evil empire needing to be resisted.

According to journalist David Crossland: "The old nationalism has been replaced by an easy-going patriotism that mainly manifests itself at sporting events like the soccer World Cup." The German Bundesliga football club DSC Arminia Bielefeld is named after Arminius. In the German diaspora, though, the 2,000-year anniversary of the battle was celebrated in New Ulm, Minnesota, proudly and without restraint. Mock battles between Romans and club-wielding barbarians were held, as was also a lecture series in an auditorium.

== Cultural references ==
=== Literature ===
Fictionalized versions of Arminius or commentary upon his legacy appear in:

- Arminius (1520), by Ulrich von Hutten
- Die Hermannschlacht (1808) by Heinrich von Kleist
- Germany. A Winter's Tale (1843) by Heinrich Heine
- The Fifteen Decisive Battles of the World (1851) by Sir Edward Shepherd Creasy
- I, Claudius (1934) by Robert Graves
- What If? (1999), edited by Robert Cowley
- Give Me Back My Legions! (2009) by Harry Turtledove
- Eagles At War (2015) by Ben Kane
- Wolves of Rome (2016) by Valerio Massimo Manfredi (first published in Italian as Teutoburgo)
- Dead Romans (2023) by Fred Kennedy and Nick Markinkovich (published by Image Comics)

=== Music and opera ===
- Arminio is a 1692 opera about Arminius by the Bohemian-Austrian composer Heinrich Ignaz Franz Biber.
- Germanico in Germania, a 1732 opera by Nicola Porpora
- Arminio is a 1736 opera about Arminius by George Frideric Handel.
- Arminius is an 1877 oratorio about Arminius by the German composer Max Bruch.

=== Film ===
- Massacre in the Black Forest, (German: Hermann der Cherusker – Die Schlacht im Teutoburger Wald), a 1967 historical film

=== Television ===
- Barbarians is a 2020 TV show that features a fictionalised version of Arminius (portrayed by Laurence Rupp) as one of the central characters.

== See also ==
- Ariovistus
- Bato the Breucian
- Bato the Daesitiate
- Boudica
- Divico
- Gaius Julius Civilis
- Teutobod
- Vercingetorix
