= Die Hermannsschlacht (Kleist) =

1808 play by Heinrich von Kleist

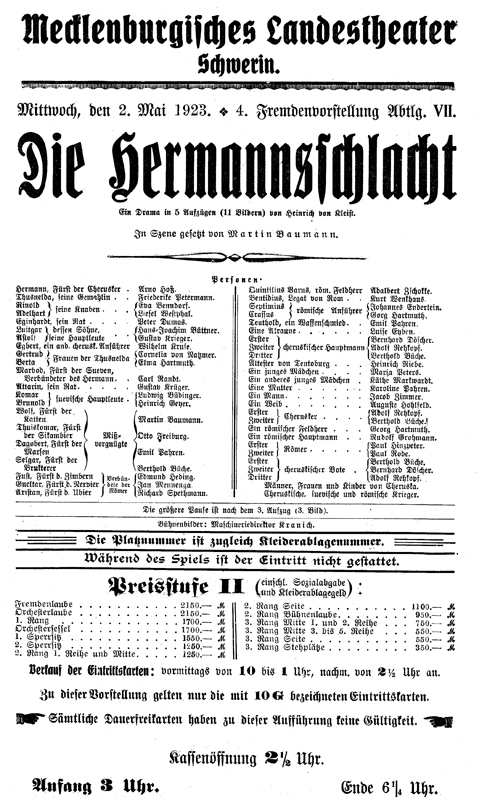
- Advertisement for a 1923 production of the play
- Written by: Heinrich von Kleist
- Based on: Battle of the Teutoburg Forest
- Date premiered: 1839
- Place premiered: Pyrmont
- Original language: German

Die Hermannsschlacht (literally The Battle of Hermann) is an 1808 drama in five acts by German author Heinrich von Kleist. It is based on the Battle of the Teutoburg Forest (9 AD) which took place between the Romans and Germanic tribes near Kalkriese in Germany.

== Background ==
Die Hermannsschlacht was written in 1808, after the Prussian defeat by Napoleon I in the War of the Fourth Coalition, and was intended to be read in this context. Kleist's readers would have recognised Rome as France, the Cherusci as Germany, and the Suebi as Austria.

The play has been read as Kleist's call for resistance against the French, but this has come into doubt in recent years.

== Plot ==
Hermann, Prince of the Cherusci, is beset on two sides. The Prince of the Suebi, Marbod, stands in the southeast of his country and demands tribute from him. The Roman general Varus approaches with three legions from the West and offers his help against Marbod, but has secretly offered to support Marbod against Hermann. The Germanic princes gather with Hermann and urge him to make war against the Romans, which he refuses, because of the military inferiority of the Germans.

Hermann's wife Thusnelda is courted by the Roman legate Ventidius, who secretly cuts off a lock of her blond hair. Ventidius brings about an ultimate offer of help by the Romans, which Hermann eventually seems to accept. At the same time, however, Hermann sets himself in contact with Marbod, whom he informs about the duplicity of Varus, and offers him to join the battle. The Romans march into the land of the Cherusci and ravage it. Hermann uses the behavior of the Romans to stir up hatred among the people against them. He encounters Varus in Teutoburg and manages to deceive him.

Marbod is reluctant to ally with the Cherusci, but is convinced firstly by the escape of his Roman advisors, and secondly because, as proof of his loyalty, Hermann put the lives of his two sons into the hands of the Suebian Prince. The rape of a Germanic girl gives Hermann an occasion to call the people to revolt against the Romans. He shows Thusnelda a letter from Ventidius, in which he promises the Empress Livia Thusnelda's blond hair. The Romans wander through the Teutoburg Forest and are abandoned by their Germanic allies. Thusnelda gets revenge on Ventidius by luring him into the enclosure of a bear that then kills him. In the battle of the Teutoburg Forest, the Roman legions of Varus are defeated and their commander killed. The Germanic princes make Hermann king and decide to "march bravely against the city of Rome itself."

== Reception ==
The play Hermannsschlacht premiered finally in 1839, in an edited version of Feodor Wehl in Breslau (modern day Wrocław), but without much success. Other performances of this version of the text in Dresden, Leipzig, Hamburg, Stuttgart and Graz in 1861, and festival performances the fiftieth anniversary of the Battle of Leipzig in 1863 in Karlsruhe and Kassel were also unsuccessful. Another version by Rudolf Genée arose in 1871, after the war against France and was first performed in Munich.

Only with the productions of the Berlin Schauspielhaus and the Meiningen Court Theatre in 1875, did the piece gain popularity with the audience. The Meininger staging was by recourse to the original Kleist, playing a convincing ensemble, and the crowd scenes stylistically impressive. Altogether there were 103 performances in 16 German-speaking stages, with the last toured in 1890 to Saint Petersburg, Moscow and Odesa. Meiningen staged 36 performances.

Last with the Berlin performance in 1912, for the centennial anniversary of the liberation wars, attended the premiere of the imperial family, which was Hermann battle as a patriotic drama. In the First World War, shows were interrupted by the latest news from the Western Front. For the period of National Socialism, the Hermann battle reached a political climax, just for the 1933/34 season are 146 performances demonstrated/performed. Therefore, the piece after 1945 was only rarely performed, only the Harz mountain valley theater in the GDR, 1957 there was a production with political bias against the United States and its Western allies.

In his internationally successful production of 1982, Claus Peymann at the Schauspielhaus Bochum cut out the subplot between Thusnelda (Kirsten Dene) and Hermann (Gert Voss). Peymann saw in the piece the "model of a liberation war" with all its contradictions.

== Sources ==
- Angress, R. K. (1977). "Kleist's Treatment of Imperialism: 'Die Hermannsschlacht' and 'Die Verlobung in St. Domingo'". Monatshefte. 69 (1): 17–33. JSTOR 30156776.
