= Johannes Moser (ethnologist) =

German ethnologist

Johannes Moser is a German ethnologist who is Chair for Volkskunde/European Ethnology at LMU Munich.

== Biography ==
Moser received his Ph.D. in ethnology from the University of Graz 1993, and habilitated at the Goethe University Frankfurt in 2002. Moser has researched and taught at the universities of Graz, Vienna, Frankfurt, Zurich, and Basel. From 2002 to 2006 he was Head of the Division of Volkskunde at the Institute for the History of Saxony and Volkskunde in Dresden. Since August 2006, Moser has been Chair for Volkskunde/European Ethnology at LMU Munich. He was served as Dean (2011-2013) and Vice Dean (2013-2015) of the Faculty for the Study of Culture at LMU Munich, and as Head of the Deutsche Gesellschaft für Volkskunde (2015-2019).

== Selected works ==
- Europäisch-ethnologisches Forschen, 2013
- Wissenschaft als Leidenschaft, 2013
- Europäische Ethnologie in München, 2015
- The Vulnerable Middle Class?, 2019
