= History of North Rhine-Westphalia =

North Rhine-Westphalia was established by the British military administration's "Operation Marriage" on 23 August 1946 by merging the Rhine Province with the Province of Westphalia. On 21 January 1947, the former Free State of Lippe was merged with North Rhine-Westphalia.

== Julius Caesar ==
At around 55BC, the time of Julius Caesar, the territories west of the Rhine in this region were occupied by the Eburones, one of the tribes he identified as "Germani cisrhenani", who lived within the part of Gaul associated with the Belgae. Caesar reports that he tried to annihilate the Eburones and their name. Once part of the Roman empire, their country was occupied by a Germanic tribe with a different name, the Tungri. However, Tacitus reported that "Tungri" was a new name for the original "Germani", stating that in fact the first tribal group to be called by that name were the ones from west of the Rhine. (Although the term "Germani" was used, and Caesar and other Roman historians clearly reported that there was kinship with tribes East of the Rhine, there is evidence that these early tribes on both sides of the Rhine used Celtic languages.)

Of the related tribes on the eastern bank of the Rhine, Caesar reported the Ubii, who were already requesting permission to migrate over the Rhine as they later would, near modern Cologne, and the Sugambri, who lived to the north of them near the modern Rhine-Ruhr area. Both tribes were under pressure from Suebi who had moved into the region to their east, and while he was in the area a major migration occurred under this pressure, with large numbers of Usipeti and Tencteri moving into the area near the Sugambri, and eventually attempting to cross the Rhine near where it joins the Maas, only to be pushed back aggressively by Caesar. They were still to be found near the eastern banks of the Rhine during imperial times.

== Roman Empire and the Franks ==
Julius Caesar conquered the tribes on the left (western) bank of the Rhine, and Augustus established numerous fortified posts along it, but the Romans never succeeded in gaining a firm footing on the right bank. During imperial times all or most of North Rhine-Westphalia west of the Rhine was split out from Belgica as a frontier province, Germania Inferior, and there were new settlers brought into the area, some from across the Rhine such as the Ubii. The Ubii's region including modern Neuss, Cologne and Bonn, was called the "Civitas Ubiorum" and apparently also included the Sunuci. The Cugerni, who lived in the "Civitas Traiana" near Xanten during imperial times, are often thought to be Sugambri who had been resettled by the Romans west of the Rhine. Also living in the Traiana were the Betasii. (The other parts of Germania Inferior were mainly in the areas of modern Belgium and the Netherlands.)

East of the Rhine, Roman historians such as Tacitus report that to the north of the Sugambri were also the Bructeri, who pushed further south into the Sugambrian area during imperial times, under pressure from their northern neighbours the Chamavi and Angrivarii. North of them, in turn, and probably still in Westphalia, were the Chasuarii and Dulgubnii. Another tribe living east of the Rhine near the Sugambri, possibly as a sub-tribe, were the Marsi. The Usipetes who Caesar had reported as arriving in the area in his time stayed in the region north of the Rhine near where it joins the Maas, while the Tencteri moved into the area vacated by the Ubii, facing Cologne.

Around 1 A.D. there were numerous incursions through Westphalia and perhaps even some permanent Roman or Romanized settlements. The Battle of Teutoburg Forest took place near Osnabrück (as mentioned, it is disputed whether this is in Westphalia) and some of the tribes who fought at this battle came from the area of Westphalia.

By late Roman times it appears that whatever remained of these tribal groupings began to be referred to as the Franks, who were being pressed from the North by the Saxons. As the power of the Roman empire declined the Franks crossed the Rhine. For example, the Chattuari moved from somewhere near the Chamavi, into the area around Xanten, as well as the area previously inhabited by the Sugambri. By the end of the 5th century, Franks had conquered all the left bank lands of North Rhine-Westphalia, but Saxons were pushing into Westphalia, the name of which has its origins as one of the original main parts of their territory.

By the 8th century the Frankish dominion was firmly established in most of western Germany and northern Gaul. Lasting hegemony over the Saxons, including those in Westphalia, was achieved in the 9th century by Charlemagne in the Saxon wars.

== Holy Roman empire ==
Charlemagne is thought to have spent considerable time in Paderborn and nearby parts. His Saxon Wars also partly took place in what is thought of as Westphalia today. Popular legends link his adversary Widukind to places near Detmold, Bielefeld, Lemgo, Osnabrück and other places in Westphalia. Widukind was buried in Enger, which is also a subject of a legend.

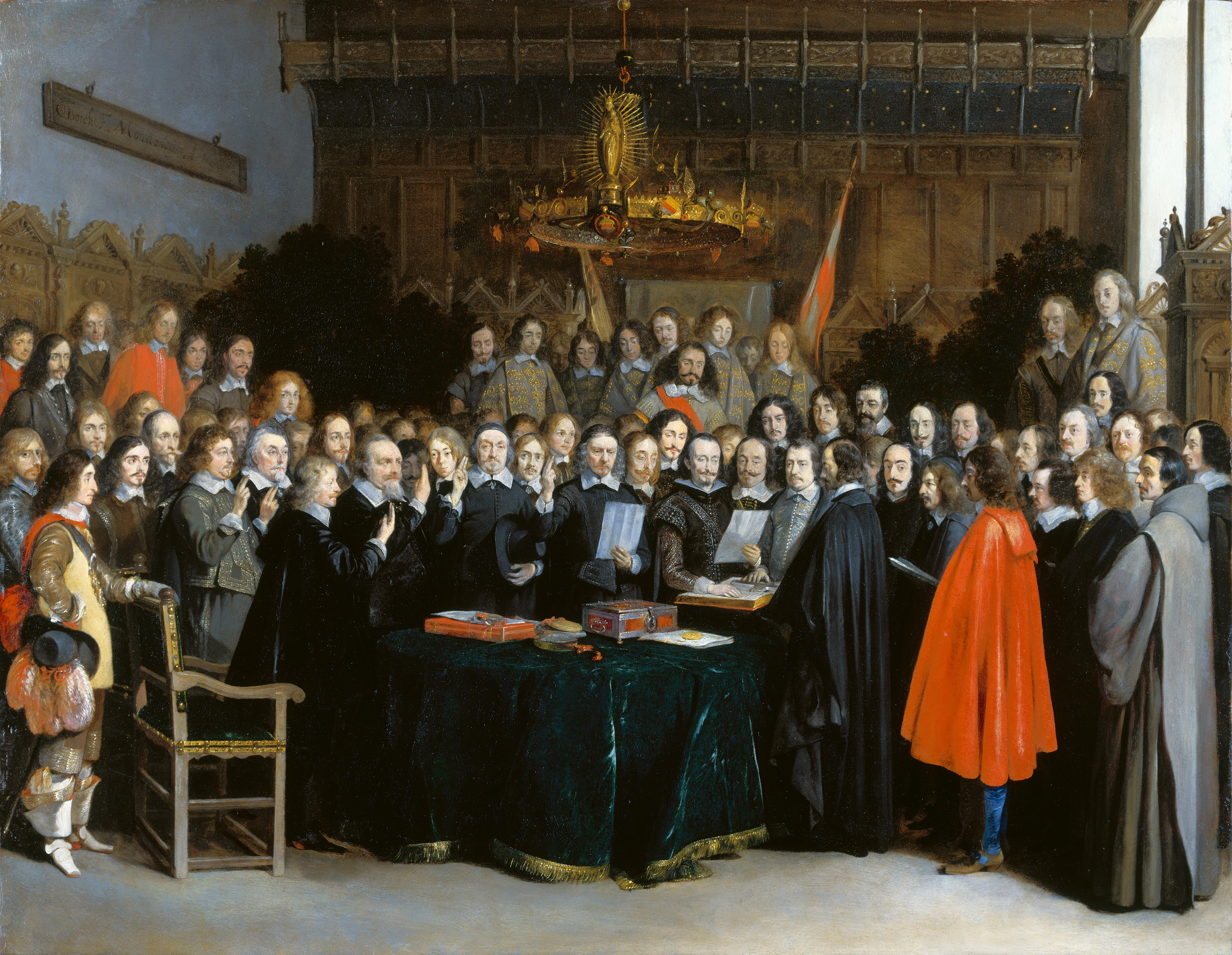
Ratification of the Peace of Westphalia of 1648 in Münster by Gerard Terborch (1617-1681)

Along with Eastphalia and Engern, Westphalia (Westfalahi) was originally a district of the Duchy of Saxony. In 1180 Westphalia was elevated to the rank of a duchy by Emperor Barbarossa. The Duchy of Westphalia comprised only a small area south of the Lippe River.

On the division of the Carolingian Empire at the Treaty of Verdun the part of the province to the east of the river fell to East Francia, while that to the west remained with the kingdom of Lotharingia. By the time of Otto I. (d. 973) both banks of the Rhine had become part of the Holy Roman Empire, and the Rhenish territory was divided between the duchies of Upper Lorraine, on the Mosel, and Lower Lorraine on the Meuse.

As the central power of the Holy Roman Emperor weakened, the Rhineland split up into numerous small independent principalities, each with its separate vicissitudes and special chronicles. The old Lotharingian divisions became obsolete, and the name of Lorraine became restricted to the district that still bears it.

In spite of its dismembered condition, and the sufferings it underwent at the hands of its French neighbours in various periods of warfare, the Rhenish territory prospered greatly and stood in the foremost rank of German culture and progress. Aachen was the place of coronation of the German emperors, and the ecclesiastical principalities of the Rhine bulked largely in German history.

== Middle Ages ==
Parts of Westphalia came under Brandenburg-Prussian control during the 17th and 18th centuries, but most of it remained divided duchies and other feudal areas of power. The Peace of Westphalia of 1648, signed in Münster and Osnabrück, ended the Thirty Years' War. The concept of nation-state sovereignty resulting from the treaty became known as "Westphalian sovereignty".

== Early modern era ==
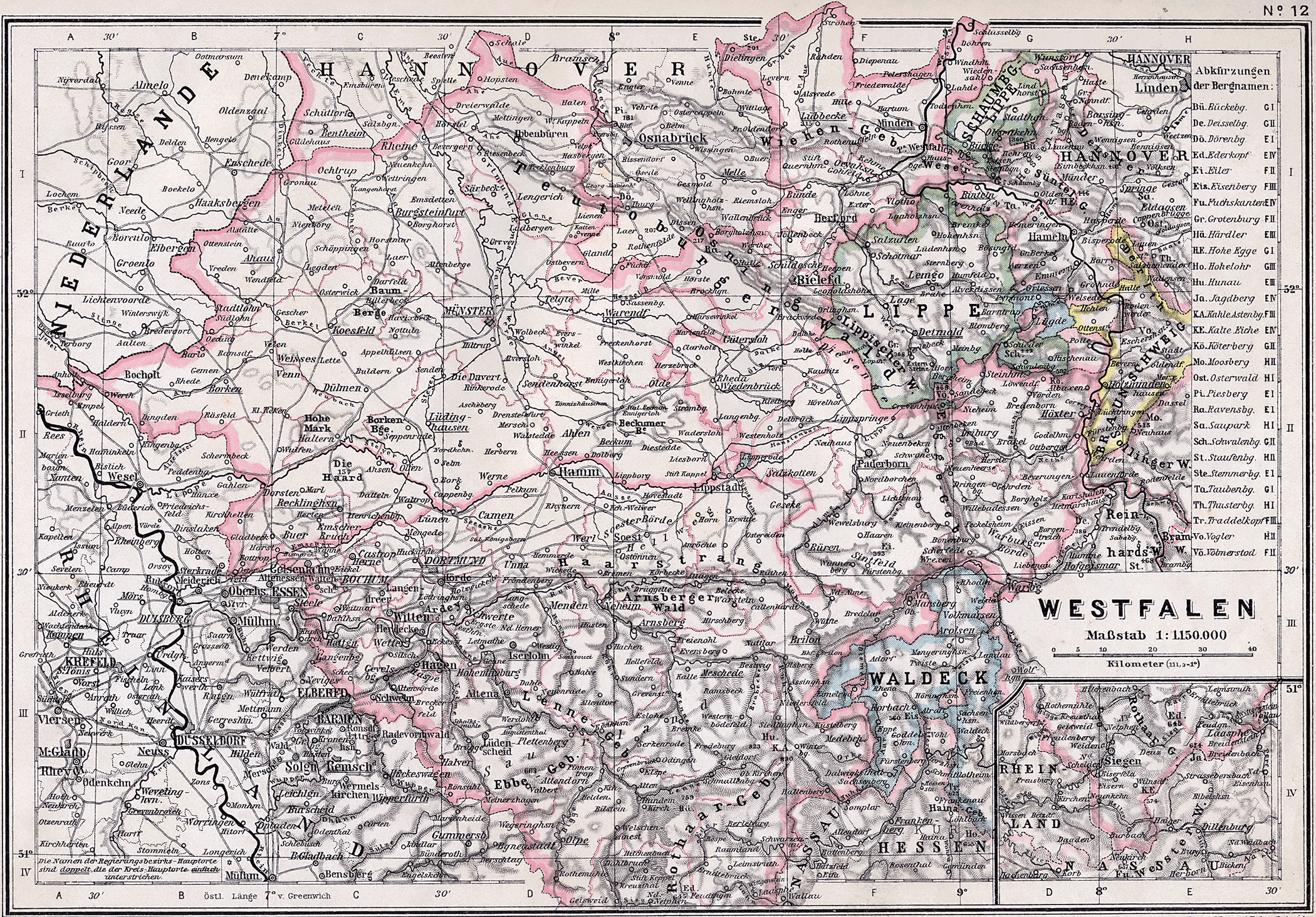
The Prussian Province of Westphalia in 1905

As a result of the Protestant Reformation, there is no dominant religion in Westphalia. Roman Catholicism and Lutheranism are on relatively equal footing. Lutheranism is strong in the eastern and northern parts with numerous free churches. Münster and especially Paderborn are thought of as Catholic. Osnabrück is divided almost equally between Catholicism and Protestantism.

After the defeat of the Prussian Army at the Battle of Jena-Auerstedt, the Treaty of Tilsit in 1807 made the Westphalian territories part of the Kingdom of Westphalia from 1807 to 1813. It was founded by Napoleon and was a French vassal state. This state only shared the name with the historical region; it contained only a relatively small part of Westphalia, consisting instead mostly of Hessian and Eastphalian regions.

After the Congress of Vienna, the Kingdom of Prussia received a large amount of territory in the Westphalian region and created the province of Westphalia in 1815. The northernmost portions of the former kingdom, including the town of Osnabrück, had become part of the states of Hanover and Oldenburg.

== Prussian influence ==
Prussia first set foot on the Rhine in 1609 by the occupation of the Duchy of Cleves and about a century later Upper Guelders and Moers also became Prussian. At the peace of Basel in 1795 the whole of the left bank of the Rhine was resigned to France, and in 1806 the Rhenish princes all joined the Confederation of the Rhine. The congress of Vienna assigned the whole of the lower Rhenish districts to Prussia, which had the tact to leave them in undisturbed possession of the liberal institutions they had become accustomed to under the republican rule of the French.

During the late 19th century the region developed into the center of the German steel industry, whose products were shipped and used in construction worldwide. The Stahlhof in central Düsseldorf, constructed in 1906–08, became the epicenter of the administration of these vast enterprises.

In 1920, the Saar was separated from the Rhine Province and administered by the League of Nations until a plebiscite in 1935, when the region was returned to the German Reich. At the same time, in 1920, the districts of Eupen and Malmedy were transferred to Belgium (see German-Speaking Community of Belgium). In 1946, the Rhine Province was divided into the newly founded states of Hesse, North Rhine-Westphalia and Rhineland-Palatinate.

== Creation of the state ==
North Rhine-Westphalia was established by the British military administration's "Operation Marriage" on 23 August 1946.

Originally, it consisted of Westphalia and the northern parts of the Rhine Province, both formerly part of Prussia. On 21 January 1947, the former state of Lippe was merged with North Rhine-Westphalia. The constitution of North Rhine-Westphalia was then ratified through a referendum.

== See also ==
History of cities in North Rhine-Westphalia

- History of Cologne
- History of Münster

Timelines of cities in North Rhine-Westphalia

- Timeline of Aachen
- Timeline of Bonn
- Timeline of Cologne
- Timeline of Dortmund
- Timeline of Duisburg
- Timeline of Düsseldorf
- Timeline of Essen
- Timeline of Münster
