= Tubantes =

Germanic tribe living north of the Rhine

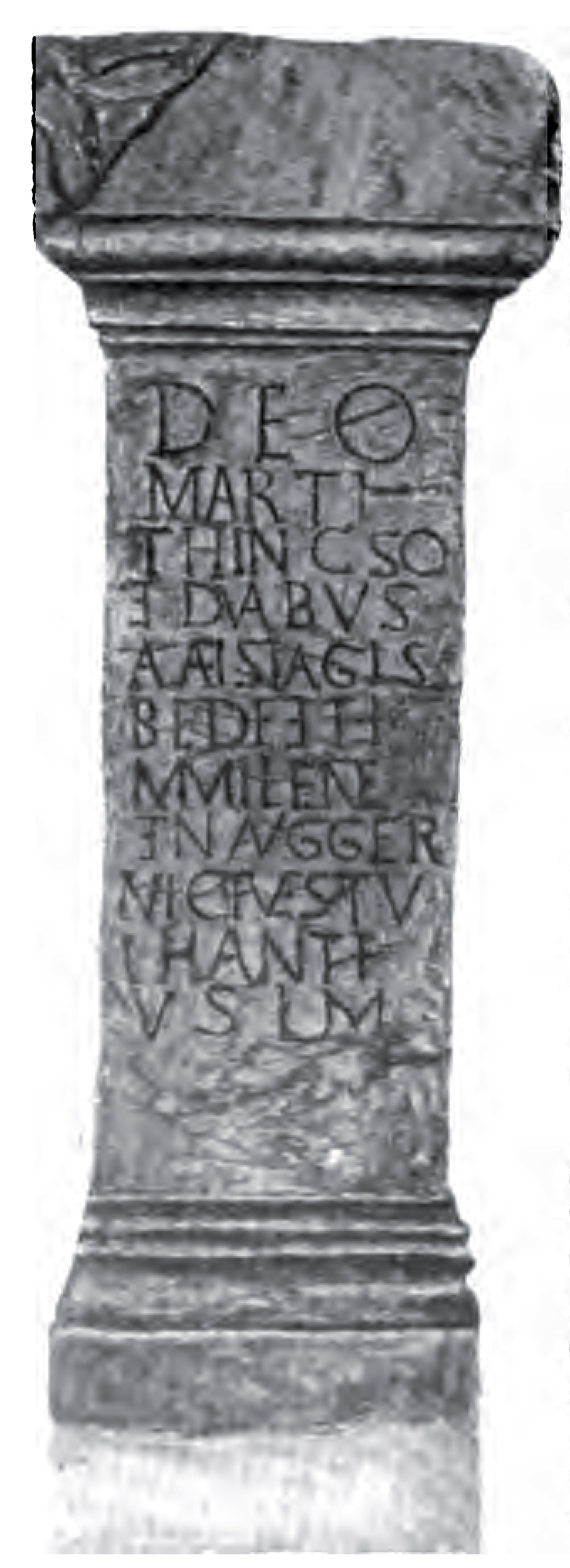
Altar stone found close to Hadrian's Wall, containing the oldest known mention of the Tubantes/Tuihanti

The Tubantes were a Germanic tribe, living in the eastern part of the Netherlands, north of the Rhine river. They are often equated to the Tuihanti, who are known from two inscriptions found near Hadrian's Wall. The modern name Twente derives from the word Tuihanti.

== History ==
Little is known about the Tubantes. They are first mentioned in a description of the first expedition of Germanicus against the Marsi in 14 AD, when they, in coalition with the Bructeri and Usipetes, ambushed the Roman forces returning to their winter-quarters, probably somewhere in the Münsterland.

In 17 AD, the Tubantes are apparently referred to as the Tubattii, in Strabo's in a list of Germanic peoples defeated by Rome under Germanicus. After being vanquished by the Romans, some Tubantes were prisoners of Germanicus' triumphal procession.

In 58 AD, Tacitus reports in his Annals that the Ampsivarii, in their plea to the Romans concerning some land north of the Rhine reserved by the Roman military, that it had belonged in sequence to the Chamavi, Tubantes, and then the Usipii. (The Usipii are known to have moved into the Rhine region around the time of Caesar (55 BC), but not yet to have found permanent settlement in that time, and to have been resident at the afore-mentioned northern bank of the Rhine by the time of Drusus around 11 AD.)

In 69 AD, they provided a cohort during the Batavian Revolt, which was destroyed by the Ubii.

Claudius Ptolemy in his Geographia (2.10) appears to describe a north to south series starting with the Chamavi "under" whom are the Chatti and Tubanti, and then between these and the Sudetes mountains, thought to be the Ore Mountains, the Teuriochaemae (an otherwise unknown name, but in the place previously inhabited by the Hermanduri and later by the Thuringii, with these three names often thought to be equivalent). But the position of the Chamavi and Tubantes so far to the southeast does not match other sources, and Chamavi also seem to be mentioned under another name in a more expected place, south of the coastal Chauci, and north of the Bructeri, in between Ems and Weser. Confusingly, other tribes normally from the region of the Tubantes, the Chattuari and Chasuarii, are also described as if they are in southern Germany in this passage.

Two third-century sacral inscriptions found near Hadrian's Wall make mention of Tuihanti serving in an auxiliary unit of the Roman army, the Cuneus Frisiorum. (The Frisii was a name applied to all or most tribes north of the Rhine in Roman times, in the same general area of the Tubantes.) The inscriptions say:

- "To the god Mars and the two Alaisiagae, and to the divine power of the Emperor, the Germanic tribesmen of Tuihantis of the formation of Frisians of Vercovicium, Severus Alexanders's own, willingly and deservedly fulfilled their vow."
- "To the god Mars Thinescus and the two Alaisiagae, Beda and Fimmilena, and the divine power of the Emperor, Germanic tribemen from Tuihantis willingly and deservedly fulfilled their vow."

"Mars Thingsus" is understood as referring to the Germanic God "Tyr", who was often considered equivalent to Roman Mars, and was associated with the Germanic traditions of assemblies called "Things".

Gallienus reigned solo from 260 to 268 AD, and during this period the document known as the Laterculus Veronensis, which was made about 314 AD, notes that the Romans lost five civitates (cities, and the countries around them) on the other side of the Rhine. The three which are legible are those of the Usipii, Tubantes, and Chattuari.

In 308 AD the Tubantes joined the alliance against Constantine the Great during his campaign against the Bructeri.

In about 358 AD Julian the Apostate created a pair of new Roman military units named after the Salian Franks and the Tubantes, which apparently drew their troops from the Rhine delta area. The units were apparently formed from prisoners of war after Julian's conflict with the Salians and Chamavi. It does not however mean that we can certain that Tubantes still existed.

The name reappears as Tuianti and Tueanti in two acts from 797 and 799 AD concerning the donation of some farms in Twente and Salland to the church of Wichmond, Gelderland.

== Archaeology ==
Archaeology shows that the region associated with the Tubantes was inhabited more or less continuously since the last ice-age. The region is very fertile and will support agriculture and cattle. The countryside is marked by artificial hills, called es or esch, which were formed by depositing dung mixed with dirt. Prime examples include the Fleringer Esch, near Fleringen and the Usseler Es, also known as the Usseler Esch, near Usselo.

There is archaeological evidence of (relatively) large scale iron production in the region, specifically near Heeten, indicating that the locals understood the process of producing steel, with a carbon content of 2% [1]. The ore used was the abundant bog iron. The production sites can be dated to 280-350 AD.

== See also ==
- List of Germanic peoples
