= Dulgubnii =

Ancient Germanic tribe

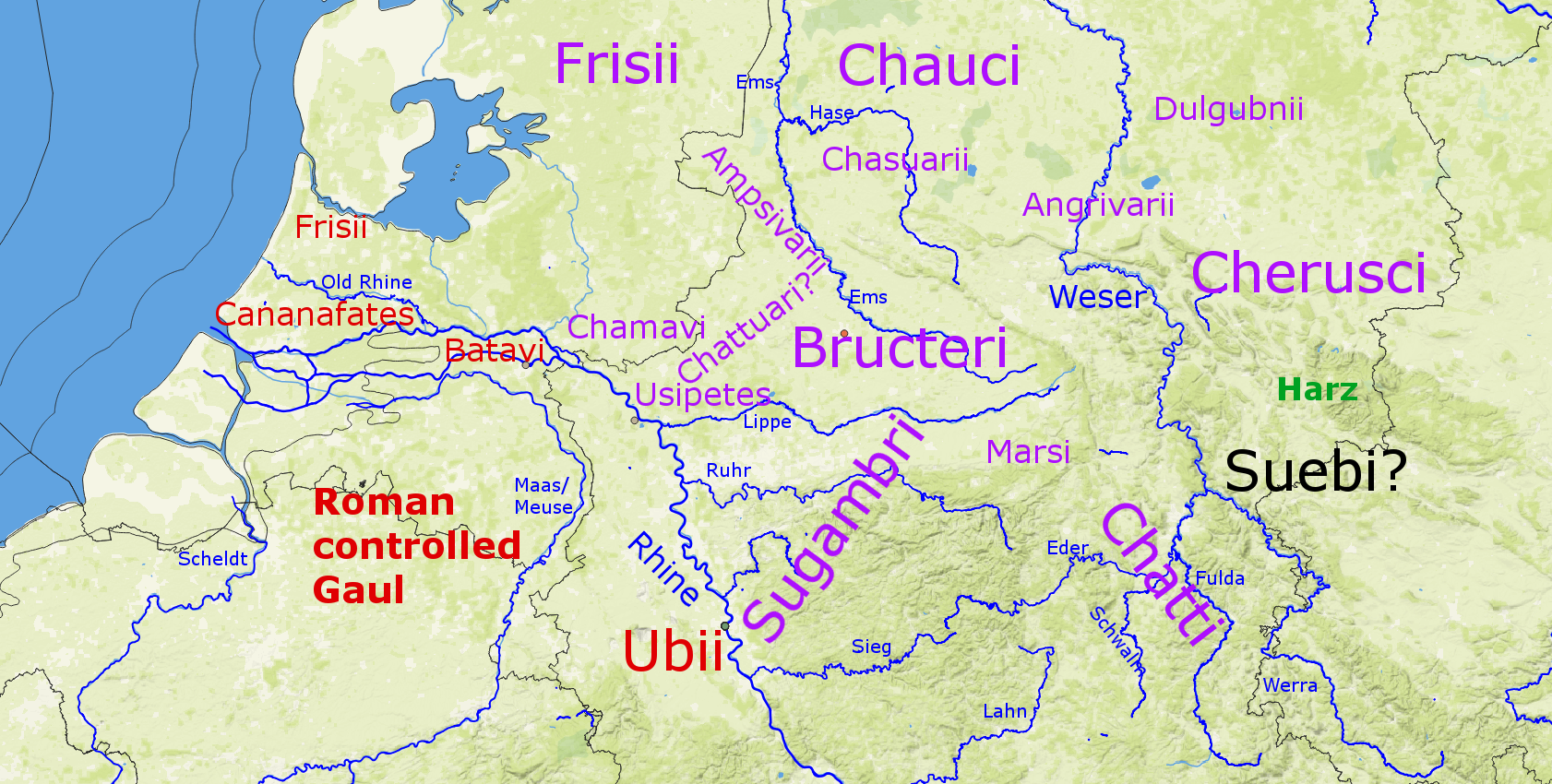
The approximate locations of several Germanic peoples mentioned in Roman sources 10 BC, before the end of the campaigns of Drusus the Elder

The Dulgubnii are a Germanic tribe mentioned in Tacitus and Ptolemy as living in what is today northwest Germany, near the Weser river.

In about 100 AD Tacitus indicated that the Dulgubnii and Chasuarii were respectively "behind" the Angrivarii and Chamavi, meaning further away from the Frisians who lived on the Rhine (Latin: Angrivarios et Chamavos a tergo Dulgubnii et Chasuarii claudunt aliaeque gentes haud perinde memoratae, a fronte Frisii excipiunt).

Spelling variants in surviving manuscripts include dulgitubini, dulcubuni, and dulgicubini.

According to Tacitus, during the period he was writing, the Angrivarii and Chamavi had both moved into the territory of their neighbours the Bructeri, who had been living between the upper Ems, the Lippe, and the Weser, between these two tribes.

The Chasuarii lived near the River Hase, north of the Bructeri lands, between the Ems and the Weser.

According to the account of Tacitus, the Chauci in his time (around 100 AD) stretched from the coast down to border upon the lands of the Chatti and Cherusci, apparently near the Weser and the original Angrivarii territory.

The Dulgubnii in Tacitus are generally believed to be the same as Ptolemy's Doulgoumnioi of the same region, mentioned in his Geography, made in the 2nd century. Ptolemy describes them between the Weser and Elbe, south of the "Laccobardi" (Langobardi), who are south of the Chauci. Also near them in this group between the Weser and Elbe are the Angrivarii.

== See also ==
- List of Germanic peoples
