= Chattuarii =

Germanic tribe

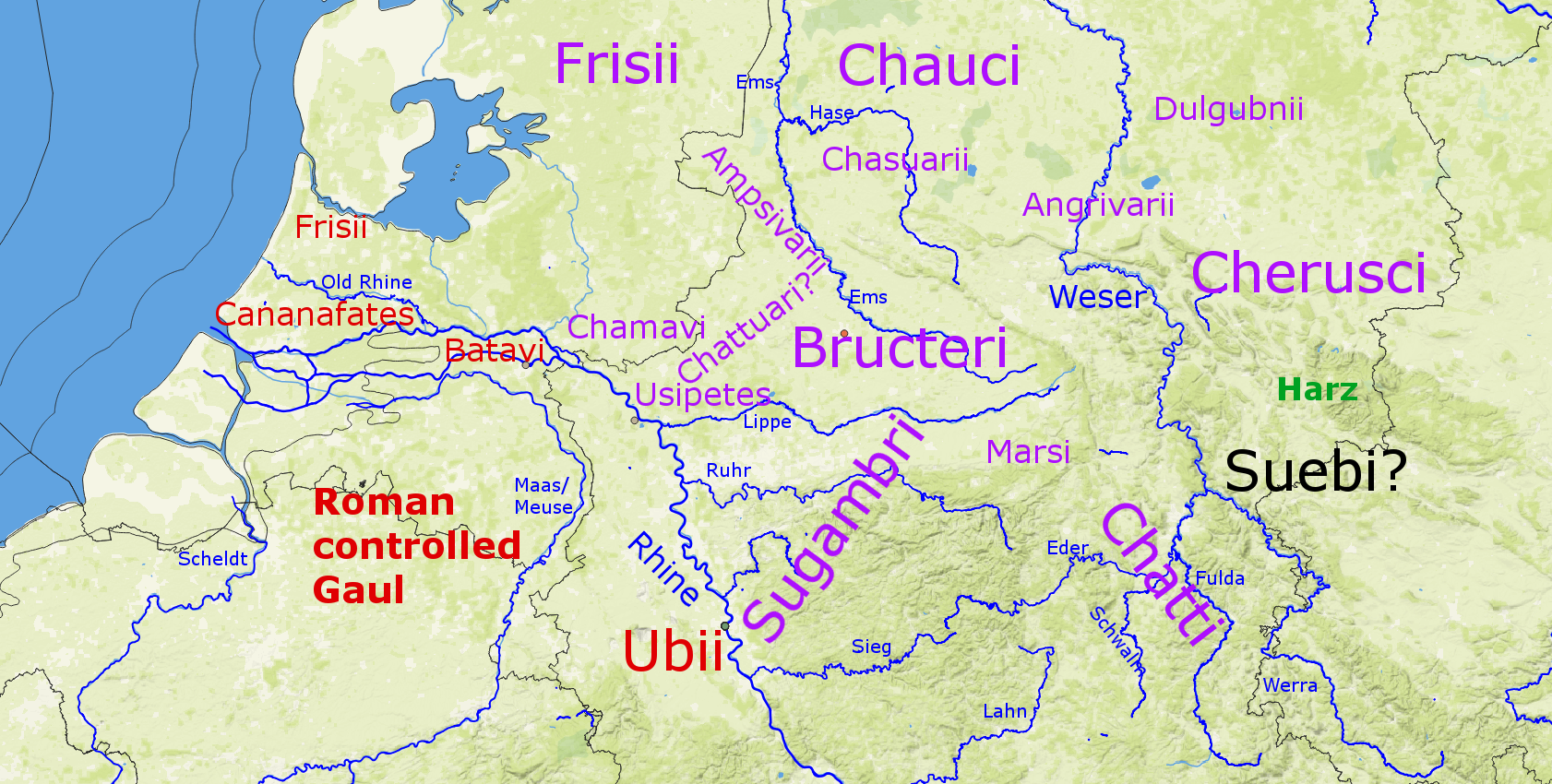
The approximate positions of some Germanic peoples reported by Graeco-Roman authors in the 1st century.

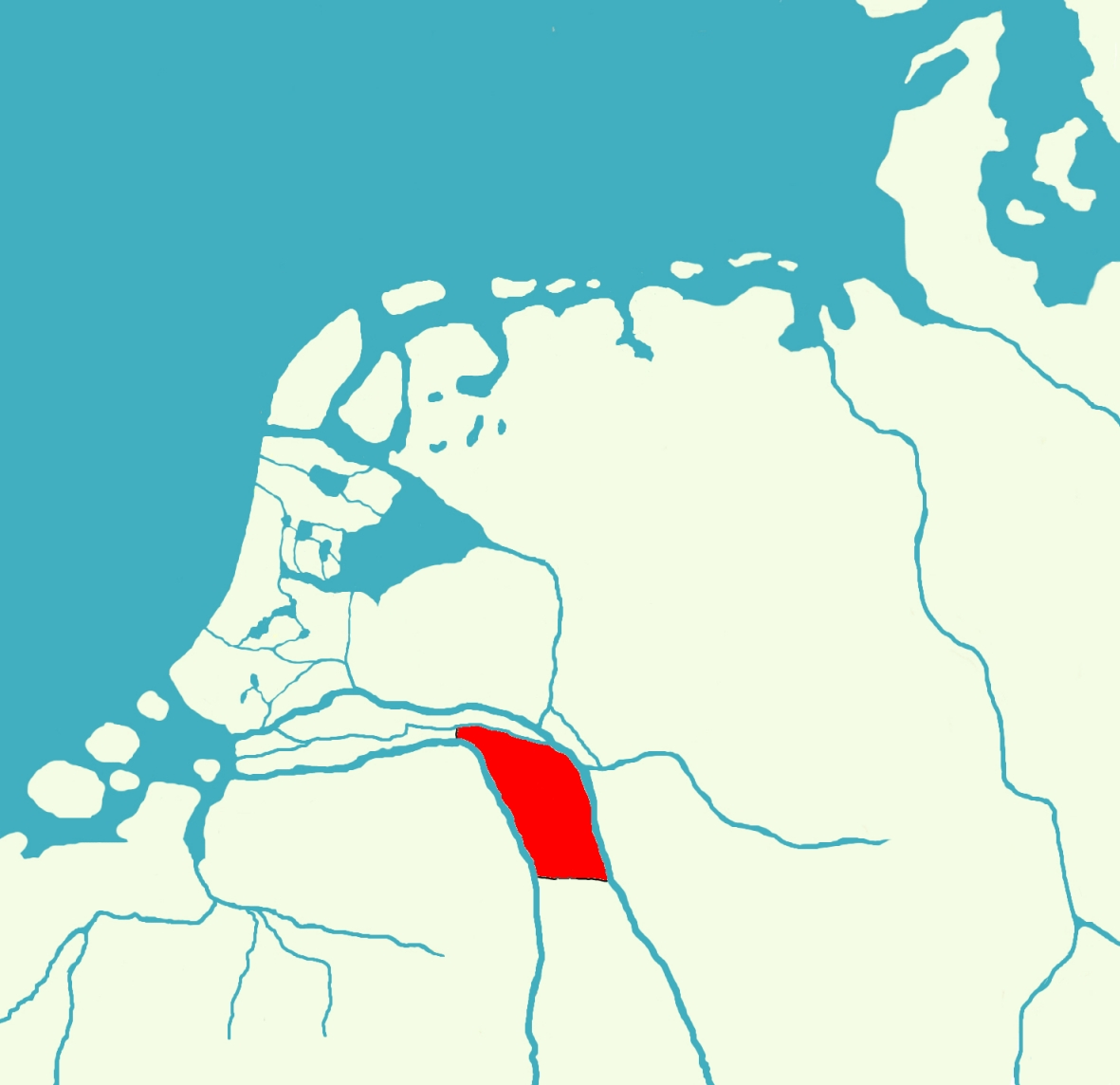
The Hettergouw at the lower Rhine in the Frankish Empire, named after the Hetware.

The Chattuarii, also spelled Attuarii, were a Germanic tribe who eventually became a part of the Franks.

They lived to the east of the Rhine delta, north of the Lippe, outside the Roman Empire, but close to it, and also near what is now the border between Germany and the Netherlands.

In the 4th century they were described as Franks who were then living near the banks of the Rhine in this same area.

Their name survived as the name of a Frankish gau, (Latin: pagus), called the pagus Hattuariensis or pagus Hetterun.

== Name and language ==
The Chattuarii are believed to have spoken a Germanic language, and their Germanic name has been reconstructed as *Chattwarijiz by Günter Neumann.

Modern scholars note that the Chattuarii name transparently means something like "Chatti dwellers". The second element in the name is common among Germanic peoples, especially in this region, such as Chasuarii “dwellers on the river Hase”, Ampsivarii "dwellers on the river Ems", and the Angrivarii. Scholars generally believe the name of the Chattuari can be interpreted as "inhabitants of the Chatti-lands", in parallel with the post-Roman names of the "Baiuvarii", which is typically interpreted as a name indicating that this people had once been inhabitants of the old homeland of the Boii, and the Boructuarii, who are believed to have been living where the Bructeri once lived.

Wagner and Rübekeil note that the name has a Germanic ending, and is always spelled with "-tt-", not "-tth-", unlike the name of the Chatti. They therefore propose that these were Germanic speaking newcomers to the region, probably Suebi, and without the same Celtic heritage. Petrikovits sees this name as evidence that Chatti had also originally lived in a more northerly region, east of the Rhine delta. He noted how Dio Cassius described how the Chatti, like their offshoots the Batavi, Cananefates and Mattiaci, were assigned land by the Romans shortly before they first appear in the historical records. According to him this implies that they had moved from elsewhere.

== Evidence ==
According to Velleius Paterculus, in 4 AD, the emperor Tiberius crossed the Rhine, first attacking a tribe which commentators interpret variously as the Cananefates or Chamavi, both being in the area of the modern Netherlands, then the Chattuari, and then the Bructeri between Ems and Lippe, in what is now Germany, somewhere in the west of Westphalia. This implies that they lived west of the Bructuri.

In about 23 AD Strabo mentioned the Chattuari as one of the non-nomadic northern Germanic tribes in a group along with the Cherusci, the Chatti, and the Gamabrivii. He also contrasted them with other non-nomadic tribes supposedly near the Ocean, the Sugambri, the "Chaubi", the Bructeri, and the Cimbri, "and also the Cauci, the Caülci, the Campsiani". Strabo also listed them among the tribes who allied under the Cherusci, and were made poor after being defeated by Germanicus. They apparently appeared at his triumph in 17 AD along with the Caülci, Campsani, Bructeri, Usipi, Cherusci, Chatti, Landi, and Tubanti.

Gallienus reigned solo from 260 to 268 AD, and during this period the document known as the Laterculus Veronensis, which was made about 314 AD, notes that the Romans lost five civitates (cities, and the countries around them) on the other side of the Rhine, outside the empire. The three which are legible are those of the Usipii, Tubantes, and "Gallovari". The last are generally believed to be the Chattuarii.

In 360 AD, the Chattuari appear again in the historical record again, living near the Rhine, as one of the first tribes to be known as Franks. Ammianus Marcellinus reports that Emperor Julian, crossed the Rhine border from the Roman base at Xanten and...

...entered the district belonging to a Frank tribe, called the Attuarii, men of a turbulent character, who at that very moment were licentiously plundering the districts of Gaul. He attacked them unexpectedly while they were apprehensive of no hostile measures, but were reposing in fancied security, relying on the ruggedness and difficulty of the roads which led into their country, and which no prince within their recollection had ever penetrated.

== Medieval survival of the name ==
Under the Franks, the name of the Chattuari was used for what became two early medieval gaus on either side of the Rhine, north of the Ripuarian Franks, whose capital was in Cologne. On the eastern side, they were near the Ruhr river, and across the Rhine they settled near the Niers river, between the Maas and the Rhine, where the Romans had much earlier settled the Germanic Cugerni. This western gau (Dutch: Hettergouw, German: Hattuarien) is mentioned in the Treaty of Meerssen, in the year 870 AD.

Some of them were also settled in France as laeti, lending their name to the pagus attuariorum (French Atuyer, comprising Oscheret at that time) south of Langres in the 3rd century.

The Chattuarii may also appear in the Old English poem Beowulf as "Hetwaras" where they appear to form a league together with the Hugas (who may be the Chauci) and the Frisians to fight against a Geatish raiding force from what is now Sweden. The Geats are defeated and their king Hygelac is killed. Beowulf the hero of the story is the only person to escape. According to Widsith, the Hætwera had a ruler named Hun.

== Bibliography ==
- Jungandreas, Wolfgang (1981), "Chatten I. Philologisches § 2. Sprachliches", in Beck, Heinrich; Geuenich, Dieter; Steuer, Heiko (eds.), Reallexikon der Germanischen Altertumskunde, vol. 4 (2 ed.), De Gruyter, pp. 378–392, ISBN 978-3-11-006513-8
- Lanting, J.N.; van der Plicht, J. (2010), "De ^{14}C-chronologie van de Nederlandse Pre- en Protohistorie VI: Romeinse tijd en Merovingische periode, deel A: historische bronnen en chronologische schema's", Palaeohistoria, vol. 51/52, p. 62, ISBN 978-90-77922-73-6
- Neumann, Günter (1981), "Chattwarier § 1. Der Name", in Beck, Heinrich; Geuenich, Dieter; Steuer, Heiko (eds.), Reallexikon der Germanischen Altertumskunde, vol. 4 (2 ed.), De Gruyter, pp. 391–392, ISBN 978-3-11-006513-8
- Nonn, Ulrich (1983), Pagus und Comitatus in Niederlothringen: Untersuchung zur politischen Raumgliederung im frühen Mittelalter
- Petrikovits, Harald (1981), "Chatten II. Historisches", in Beck, Heinrich; Geuenich, Dieter; Steuer, Heiko (eds.), Reallexikon der Germanischen Altertumskunde, vol. 4 (2 ed.), De Gruyter, pp. 379–386, ISBN 978-3-11-006513-8
- Petrikovits, Harald (1981b), "Chattwarier § 2. Historisches", in Beck, Heinrich; Geuenich, Dieter; Steuer, Heiko (eds.), Reallexikon der Germanischen Altertumskunde, vol. 4 (2 ed.), De Gruyter, pp. 391–393, ISBN 978-3-11-006513-8
- Rübekeil, Ludwig (2002), "Canninefates. Nomen und Gens in der keltisch-germanischen Kontaktzone", Actas do XX congreso internacional de ciencias onomásticas, Santiago 1999, pp. 1237–1247
- Wagner, Norbert (2011), "Lat.-germ. Chatti und ahd. Hessi 'Hessen'", Historische Sprachforschung / Historical Linguistics, 124: 277–280, doi:10.13109/hisp.2011.124.1.277, JSTOR 41553577

== See also ==
- List of ancient Germanic peoples
