= Chamavi =

Germanic tribe

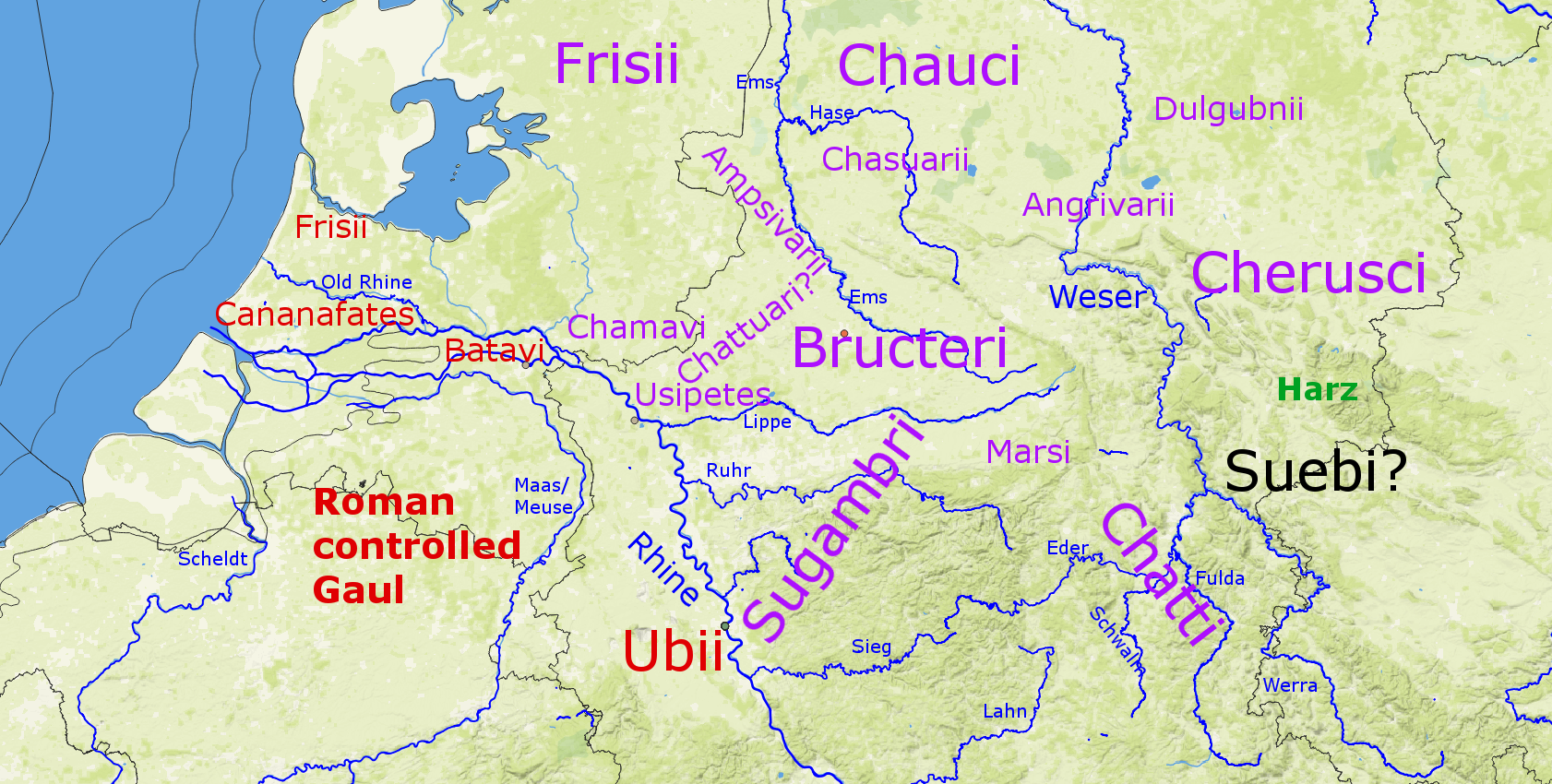
The approximate locations of the Sicambri and Bructeri in about 10 BC

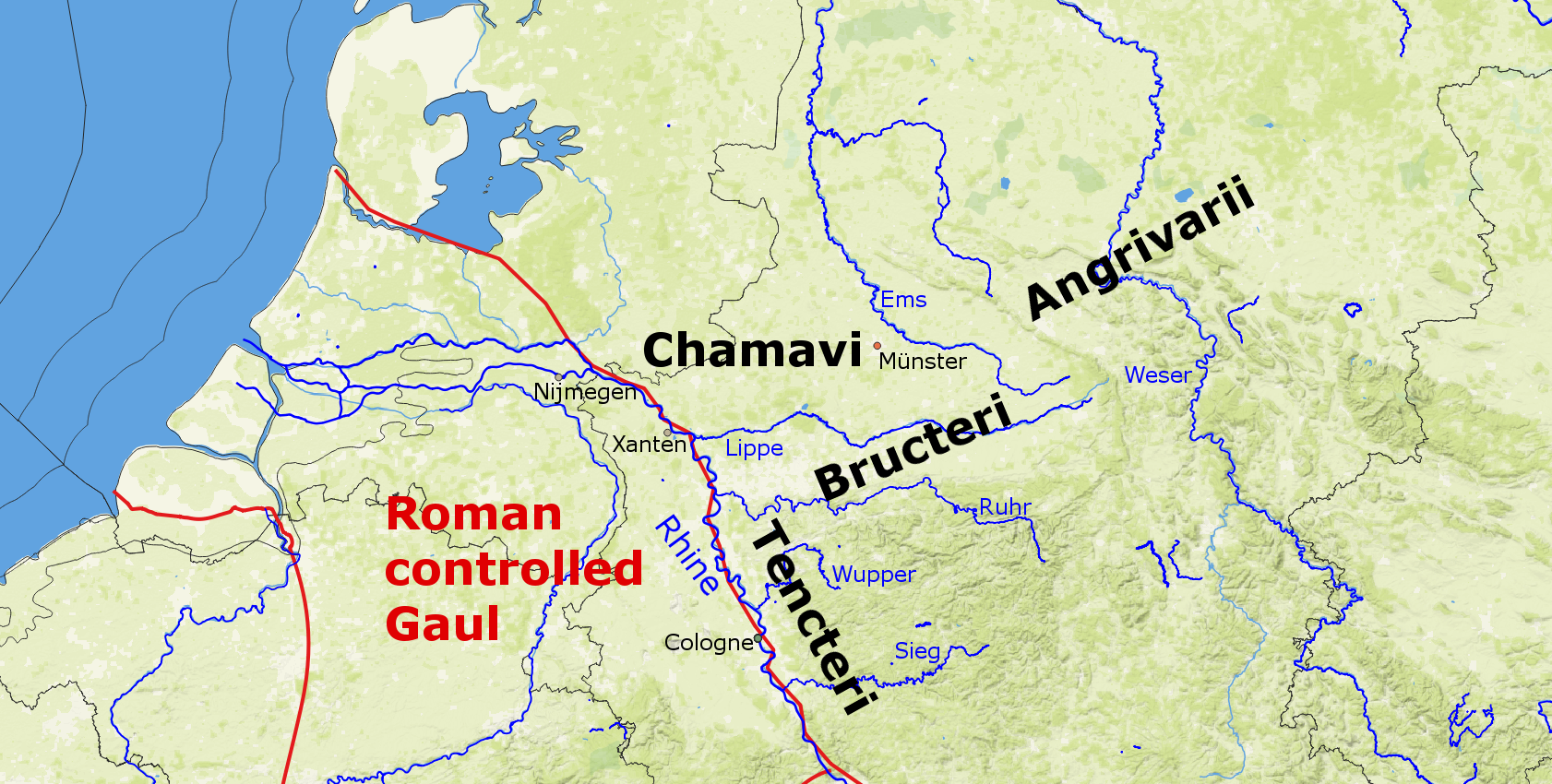
Approximate positions of tribes in about 100 AD

The Chamavi were a Germanic people of Roman imperial times who lived north of the Roman border (Limes) in the Rhine river delta region, in what is now the Netherlands, and perhaps stretching into what is now Germany.

In the Roman records of the third and fourth century, when the tribes of this region began to be categorized as Franks or Saxons, the Chamavi were at different times listed as both, and sometimes distinguished from both. In the third century Chamavi and Frisians, apparently both considered Frankish peoples, settled in the Rhine delta during a period when the empire lost control of the region. After being defeated and ejected, they were once again mentioned as entering the area in the 4th century, but this time described as a Saxon people. After being once again defeated, they were forced to supply soldiers to the Roman military.

Their name probably survives in the region called Hamaland, which is in the Gelderland province of the Netherlands, near present day Deventer between the IJssel and Ems rivers. In France, one area where the Romans settled them also continued to be named after them into the Middle Ages.

== Etymology ==
The etymology of the Chamavi name is uncertain, but it is generally believed to come from a Germanic language. Its construction is similar to those of neighbouring peoples, the Batavi and Frisiavi (Frisiavones).

The Reallexikon der Germanischen Altertumskunde lists three speculative proposals which have been made for a Germanic etymology:

- The tribal name may come from the Germanic verb reconstructed as *hammjan ("to press, hinder, hem in"). The meaning might be something like "immobile, powerless," perhaps originating as a nickname.
- It has been proposed that the word might be related to Old English hamm, which possibly comes from the same verb, and meant an "enclosed piece of land". The Chamavi would then be "those who dwell on enclosed pieces of land".
- The tribal name might be related to modern German Hemd, Dutch hemd, both meaning "shirt", reconstructed into Proto-West Germanic as *hamiþi. In this case the name might refer to war garments.

A Germanic name has been reconstructed as *Hamawiz from the name of the Matrones Hamavehae, evidence for whom was found between Jülich and Aachen.

== First and second centuries AD ==
One of the first possible records of the Chamavi is an uncertain one. According to a surviving copy of Velleius Paterculus, in 4 AD Tiberius crossed the Rhine and attacked, “cam ui faciat Tuari Bructeri”. This is often corrected in modern texts to the sequence, "Cananefates, Chattuari, Bructeri". However, it has been argued that the Cananefates (in present day South Holland) were unlikely to be in conflict with the Romans at this point, and that the original text may have referred to the Chamavi instead, implying that they lived near the Rhine, and west of the other two tribes at this time.

Tacitus reports in his Annals that in the time of Nero (apparently 58 AD), the Ampsivarii, having been ejected from their homes further to the north near the river Ems, pleaded with Roman authorities to allow them to live in a military buffer zone on the northern bank of the Rhine, saying that "these fields belonged to the Chamavi; then to the Tubantes; after them to the Usipii". These fields, were on the northern bank of the Rhine between the IJssel and Lippe, to the southeast of modern Hamaland, south of modern Twente where the Tubantes lived, and to the northwest of the Bructeri. This is known because during an earlier campaign against the Germanic tribes in 12 BC, the settlement area of the Usipii which is believed to be the same one mentioned by the Ampsivarii, bordered the Lippe to the south, which is where the country of the Sicambri began at that time. The record indicates that before 12 BC the Chamavi's lands extended to the Rhine, but that they subsequently moved out of that area.

Pliny the Elder, writing around 70 AD, categorized the Chamavi together with the Chatti, Suevi, and Hermunduri, as part of the Hermiones, which he named as one of the five races (genera) of the Germani.

In his descriptive Germania, Tacitus reported that the Chamavi and Angrivarii had moved, apparently recently in his time (around 100 AD), southwards into the lands of the Bructeri, who are described as their neighbours - "the Bructeri having been expelled and utterly destroyed by an alliance of neighboring peoples". The Bructeri originally lived in the area between the Lippe and Ems rivers, to the east of modern Hamaland. Tacitus also reports that behind the Chamavi and Angrivarii, further away from the Rhine, lived "the Dulgubini and Chasuarii, and other tribes not equally famous", and in the other direction lay the Frisians. According to Tacitus, the Tencteri and Usipii both lived to the south of the old Bructeri homeland in his time, between the Rhine and the Chatti.

Ptolemy in his Geographia, written in the second century, mentions several tribal names which could refer to the Chamavi. But the text is notoriously garbled, having combined older sources with different formats, apparently including an itinerary map similar to the Tabula Peutinger. The clearest mention of the Chamavi in this text calls them the Chaemae (Χαῖμαι), in a section which Schütte interprets as a synthesis of early first century maps (Schütte's prototypes A and Aa), from before the time of Tacitus (the Bructeri are still placed north of the Sicambri, who were destroyed in 9 BC), and an itinerary (Schütte's prototype C). These Chaemae were south of the part of the Chauci living on the coast between the Ems and Weser rivers. South of them, between the upper Ems and Weser, were the main part of the Bructeri, with another part to their west on the bank of the Rhine, with Frisians to their north and Sicambri to their south. East of these Chaemae, across the Weser, are the Angrivarii. Surprisingly then, these Chaemae are east of the Ems, and Schütte notes: "Ptolemy places the Frisians too far south, practically at the place of the Chamavi, and so it is possible that they have displaced the latter towards the east".

The Chamavi are in effect also described much further east in the Ptolemy text, where they are called the Camavi (Καμαυοὶ). They are placed with the Cherusci, west of the Elbe, and just north of the Melibocus. Schütte interprets this to result from the use of an itinerary map where Germania between Rhine and Elbe was compressed, as it is in the Tabula Peutinger. Neighbouring them to the south, the Chatti and Tubanti (ὑπὸ δὲ τοὺς Καμαυοὺς Χάτται καὶ Τούβαντοι), and Schütte noted that these tribes "have equally been transplanted from the Rhenish districts to interior Germany".

== Third and fourth centuries AD ==
In about 293 or 294 AD, according to the "8th" Latin Panegyric, made in 297 AD, Constantius Chlorus, had victories in the Scheldt and Rhine delta regions. His opponents were sometimes described as Frankish groups, but important among them were apparently groups of Chamavi and Frisii (or Frisiavones), because the Gaulish author of the text subsequently mentions that as a result of his successes, Chamavus and Frisius now plow his land, and the price of food is lower. Archaeologists note a rapid reduction of population and agriculture in at least some of the delta regions during this period, and it is believed that this may reflect the increased transplantations of delta dwellers to less populated areas of Gaul.

Many defeated and resettled Chamavi also became Roman soldiers after this campaign of Constantius, already in the third century. Although they are not explicitly listed in the Notitia Dignitatum among the Praefecti laetorum or gentilium, they may have been included among the Batavians or Franks. A cohors undecima Chamavorum was attested in the Notitia Dignitatum Orientalis for the fort Peamu. According to Petrikovits this was likely established in the 3rd century, because it was called a cohort.

In the Jura region in present day France, there is district which was traditionally known as Comté d'Amaous, which was originally named during the Roman era after a settlement of Chamavi, the pagus (Ch)amavorum.

The "4th panegyric" of 321 AD says that Constantine the Great, the son of Constantius successfully fought the Bructeri, Chamavi, Cherusci, Lancionae, Alamanni, and Tubantes, who eventually joined in an alliance against him. Several or all of these people were probably involved in the major field battle on the Rhine in 313 AD, which is reported in the "12th" panegyric. The Panegyric celebrating Constantine's pacification of the Rhine claims that Roman farmers can now safely farm on the banks of both arms of the Rhine, or in other words in Batavia. His fight against the Chamavi could have been in 310, 313 or 314 AD.

The Laterculus Veronensis of about 314, includes a list of barbarians who had spread during Roman imperial rule, including the "Camari" and several neighbouring tribes including Amsiuari, Angriuari, Bructeri, and Cati. These are all distinguished from both the Saxons and the Franks.

On the Peutinger map, which dates to as early as the 4th century, is a brief note written in the space north of the Rhine, generally read as Hamavi qui et Pranci which scholars interpret as The Hamavi, who are Franks (with a spelling error, of "p" in the place of "f").

In 341 AD the emperor Constans I, one of the sons of Constantine, attacked the Franks in the Rhine delta, and in 342 AD the situation was pacified. Scholars speculate that some Franks were given permission to remain in the area at this time.

In the Spring of 358 AD, Julian the apostate, not yet an emperor, was based in Trier and made a rapid attack against both the Salians and the Chamavi, who were both making inroads within Roman territory around the Rhine-Meuse delta. The reason for this was primarily that he needed to ensure the arrival of 600 grain carrying ships coming up the rivers from Britain, and he preferred not to simply pay the tribes off, as previous administrators had been doing. Similar accounts are given by Julian himself in his letter to the Athenians, Ammianus Marcellinus who served under him, Libanius who wrote his funeral oration, and the later Greek historians Eunapius and Zosimus. He first confronted the people who Ammianus called "Franks who are customarily called Salians". Julian says he received the submission of part of the Salian tribe, but does not call them Franks. Zosimus says the Salians were descended from the Franks.

According to Eunapius the Salians were allowed by Julian to holds lands which they had not fought for. Ammianus indicates that they had been settling in Texandria which modern scholars believe was lightly populated. However, Zosimus explains that they had been settled on the large island of Batavia in the delta, until recent raiding by the Saxons who Zosimus called the "Quadi". This island, he said, had once been Roman controlled, but more recently it was Salian held. Zosimus also reports that the Salians had previously lived outside the empire, and had in the past been forced by the Saxons to move to Batavia, within the empire. (Historians speculate that they may have been permitted by the Romans to settle in Texandria since 342.)

According to Zosimus the Franks near the delta had been defending the Roman lands against Saxon raids, so that the "Quadi" had been forced to build boats, in which they sailed along the Rhine beyond the territory of the Franks, and entered the Roman empire there. Eunapius says that Julian instructed his men not to hurt the Salians. The people who Zosimus calls Saxons or Quadi are called Chamavi by the other sources. For example, despite these differences in terminology, Zosimus and Eunapius both remark how the barbarian Charietto was brought from Trier to neutralize this group's raiding, and how Julian captured the son of their king. Julian reported to the Athenians that he subsequently ejected them from lands, and took captives, and cattle. However both Eunapius and Julian make it clear that he also needed an agreement with the Chamavi in order to secure a safe passage for food supplies. The Chamavi are treated as Franks in other records, but Zosimus contrasted them with the Salian Franks.

In 392 AD, according to a citation by Gregory of Tours, Sulpicius Alexander reported that Arbogast crossed the Rhine to punish the "Franks" for incursions into Gaul. He first devastated the territory of the Bricteri, near the bank of the Rhine at Cologne, then the Chamavi, apparently now their neighbours to the north. Neither tribe confronted him, but their allies the Ampsivarii and the Chatti were under the military leadership of the Frankish princes Marcomer and Sunno, and they appeared "on the ridges of distant hills". At this time the Bructeri had moved south and lived across the Rhine from Cologne.

== Early medieval Hamaland ==
In the early Middle Ages a Frankish gau existed called Hamaland, which scholars believe to be a name derived from the Chamavi. It was in a region similar to the Chamavi, between the IJssel and the Rhine rivers, and it included the modern Dutch cities of Deventer, Doesburg, Zutphen, and Elten.

== Lex Chamavorum Francorum ==
The Lex Chamavorum Francorum (law of the Chamavi Franks) is a modern name invented for a Frankish legal code which describes itself as the Ewa ad Amorem. It is known from several copies but is generally accepted to be one of the several legal codes made around the time of Charlemagne in the 9th century, including the Lex Salica (Salic Law), and Lex Ribuaria. It is not clear whether it was really intended to refer to Chamavi. Gaupp, the 1855 editor, proposed to name it this way based on his belief that the word "Amor" is connected to the Chamavi. Modern scholars do however continue to believe that the law applied somewhere in the area of the Rhine delta.

== See also ==
- List of ancient Germanic peoples

== Bibliography ==
- Faulkner, Thomas (2016), Law and Authority in the Early Middle Ages, Cambridge University Press, doi:10.1017/CBO9781316027097.002
- Haubrichs, Wolfgang (2017), "Les Chamaves et les autres : une enquête linguistique sur les traces des Chamaves, Hattuaires, Varasques, Scotinges et Burgondes au nord de la Bourgogne", Bulletin du centre d'études médiévales d'Auxerre, 21 (2), doi:10.4000/cem.14779
- Heather, Peter J. (2020), "The Gallic Wars of Julian Caesar", A Companion to Julian the Apostate, Brill, pp. 64–96, doi:10.1163/9789004416314_004, ISBN 978-90-04-41631-4
- Gaupp (1855), "Recherches sur la Lex Francorum Chamavorum", Revue historique de droit français et étranger, 1: 417–443
- Lanting; van der Plicht (2010), "De ^{14}C-chronologie van de Nederlandse Pre- en Protohistorie VI: Romeinse tijd en Merovingische periode, deel A: historische bronnen en chronologische schema's", Palaeohistoria, vol. 51/52, pp. 27–168, ISBN 9789077922736
- Liccardo, Salvatore (2023), Old Names, New Peoples: Listing Ethnonyms in Late Antiquity, Brill, doi:10.1163/9789004686601, ISBN 978-90-04-68660-1
- Neumann, Günter (1981), "Chamaver §1. Der Name", in Johannes Hoops; Heinrich Beck (eds.), Reallexikon der Germanischen Altertumskunde, vol. 4 (2 ed.), Walter de Gruyter, p. 368, ISBN 9783110065138
- Nixon, C. E. V.; Rodgers, Barbara Saylor (1994-01-01). In Praise of Later Roman Emperors: The Panegyrici Latini. University of California Press. ISBN 978-0-520-08326-4.
- Nonn, Ulrich (2010). Die Franken. Kohlhammer.
- Petrikovits, Harald (1981), "Chamaver §2. Historisches", in Johannes Hoops; Heinrich Beck (eds.), Reallexikon der Germanischen Altertumskunde, vol. 4 (2 ed.), Walter de Gruyter, pp. 368–370, ISBN 9783110065138
- Roymans, Nico; Heeren, Stijn (2021), "Romano-Frankish interaction in the Lower Rhine frontier zone from the late 3rd to the 5th century – Some key archaeological trends explored", Germania, 99: 133–156, doi:10.11588/ger.2021.92212
- Runde, Ingo (1998). "Die Franken und Alemannen vor 500. Ein chronologischer Überblick". In Geuenich, Dieter (ed.). Die Franken und die Alemannen bis zur "Schlacht bei Zülpich" (496/97). Reallexikon der Germanischen Altertumskunde - Ergänzungsbände. Vol. 19. De Gruyter. ISBN 978-3-11-015826-7.
- Schütte, Gudmund (1917), Ptolemy's maps of northern Europe, a reconstruction of the prototypes, Kjøbenhavn, H. Hagerup

== Primary sources ==
- Tacitus, Germania.XXXIV
- Ammianus Marcellinus, Res Gestae
- Zosimus, New History
- Latini Panegyrici
- Velleius Paterculus
