= Chasuarii =

Ancient Germanic tribe

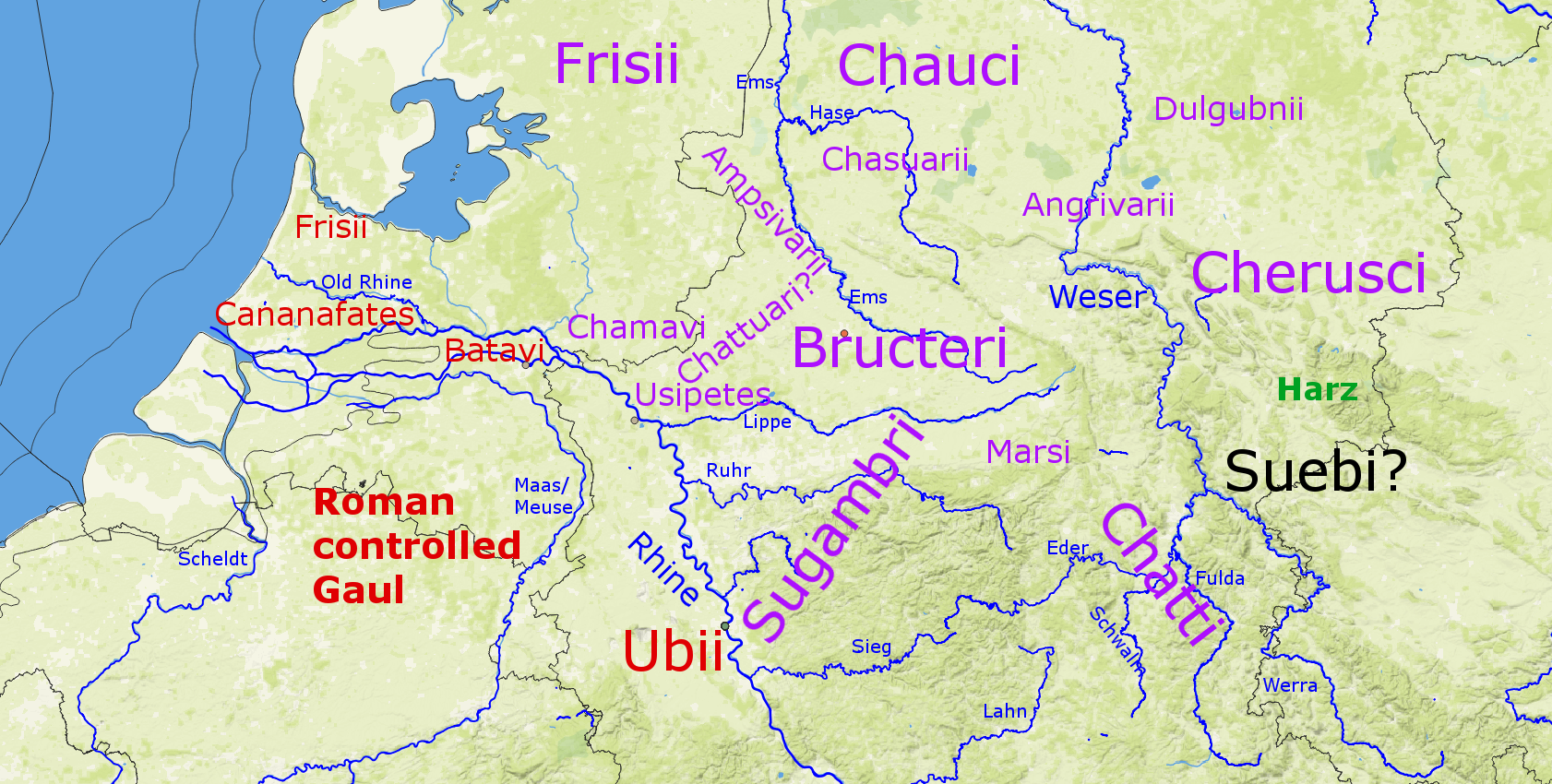
The approximate positions of some Germanic peoples in about 10 BC, with the Chasuarii presumed to be in the same place where they were later reported by Tacitus.

The Chasuarii were a Roman era Germanic people known mainly from the report of one author, Tacitus, who wrote in late first century AD. At least in the time of Tacitus, they lived in present day north Germany.

Since the 19th century the name has been interpreted as indicating that the Chasuarii lived near the river Hase, which feeds into the Ems. There is a proposed Germanic etymology for the name of this river, which connects it to the word for a grey colour. The second component of the name was common among the neighbouring Germanic peoples in the first century, such as the Ampsivarii, Chattuari, and Angrivarii, and it is believed to have meant 'dwellers' or 'inhabitants'.

This means they lived near modern Osnabrück, west of the Weser.

Although the theory is not widely accepted, the Chasuarii have occasionally been equated to the Chattuari, based on similarity of names.

Tacitus in his Germania (Chapter 34) says they lived north of the Angrivarii and Chamavi. Also north of the Angrivarii and Chamavi were the Dulgubnii, although the position of the Dulgubnii was reported by Ptolemy to be east of the Weser.

At that time Tacitus wrote, he reported that the Angrivarii and Chamavi had invaded the area once belonging to the Bructeri, between Ems, Weser and Lippe).

To the north of these peoples, on the coast of the North Sea, were the Chauci. According to Tacitus, the Chauci in his time also stretched down to border upon the lands of the Cherusci (north of the Harz mountains) and Chatti (in modern Hessen).

Claudius Ptolemy in his 2nd-century Geography placed Chasuarii (Κασουάροι), east of the Tencteri and Abnoba mountains, which he described as running north-south and parallel with the Rhine. There is no consensus about how to interpret this information.

The Chasuarii were also mentioned centuries later in the Laterculus Veronensis, which was made about 314 AD. It mentions the civitas (tribal district) of the "Casuari" as one of 5 such tribal districts east of the Rhine which had once been part of the empire, under the jurisdiction of Mainz on the Rhine, until they were invaded by barbarians in the time of emperor Gallienus, who ruled 254-268 AD. It is therefore considered possible that the Chasuarii migrated southwards into previously Roman lands during the Crisis of the Third Century.

== See also ==
- List of ancient Germanic peoples
