= Bructeri =

Germanic tribe

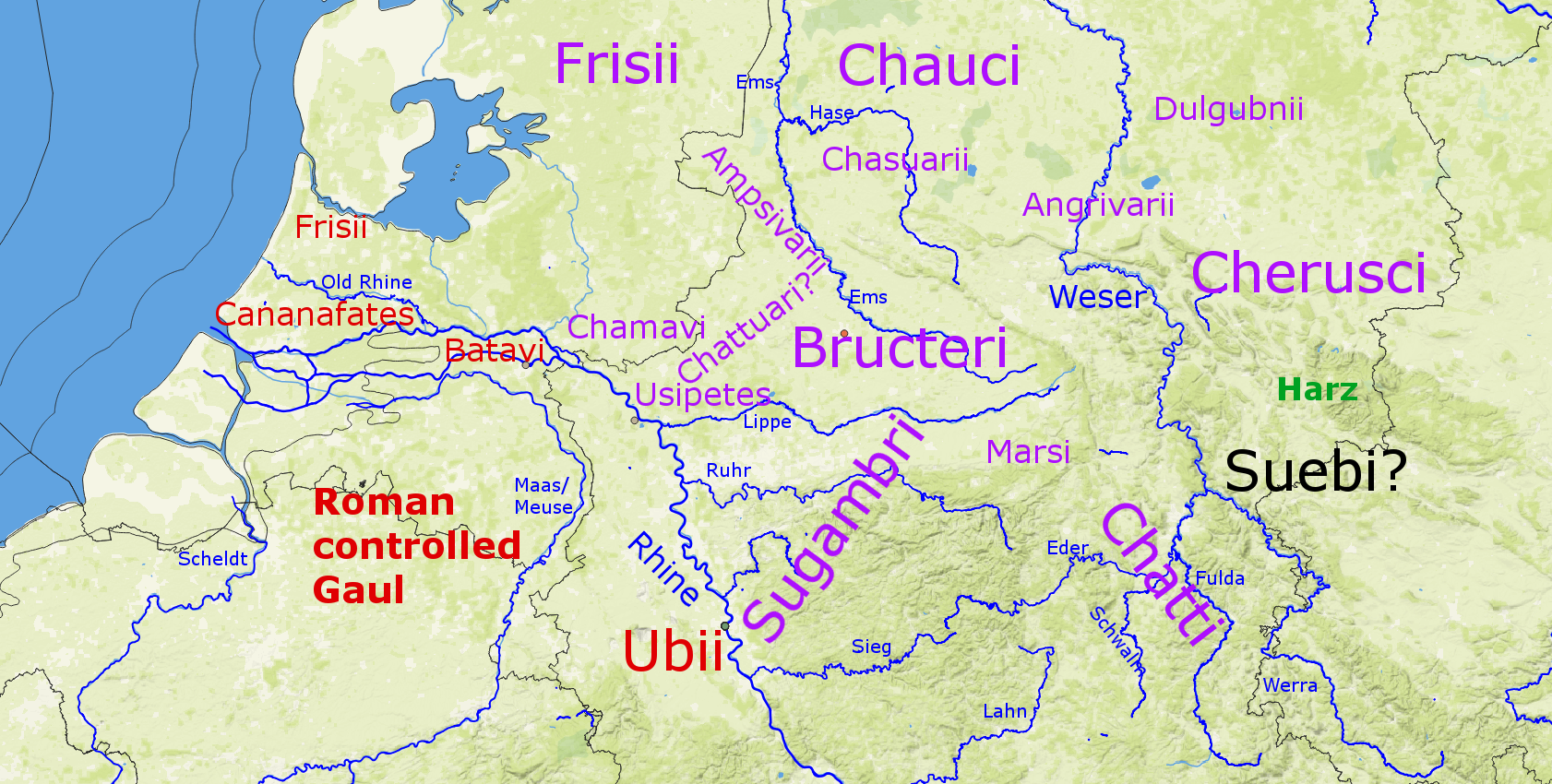
The approximate locations of the Sicambri and Bructeri in about 10 BC

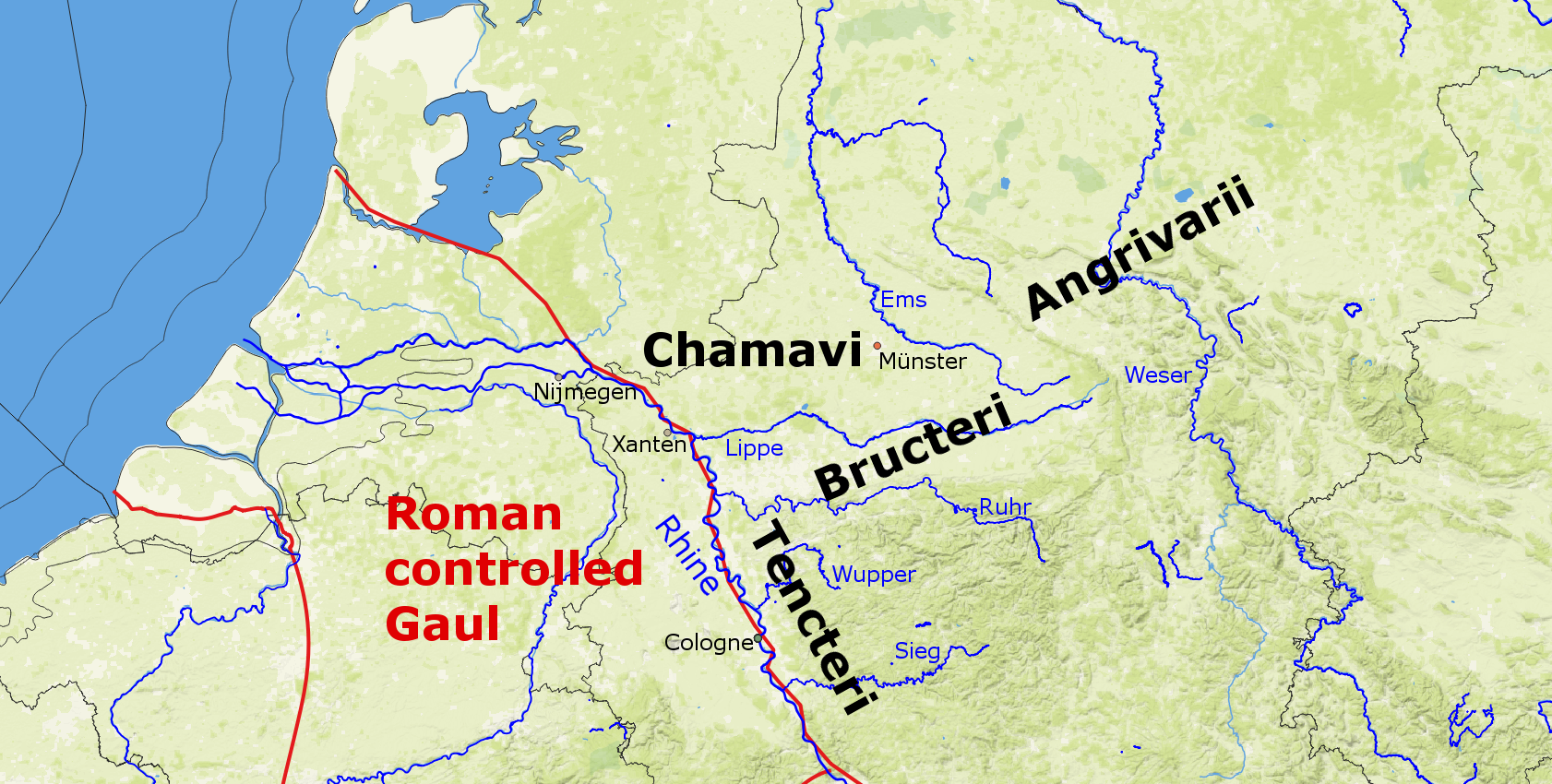
Approximate positions of tribes in about 100 AD

The Bructeri were a Roman-era Germanic people, who lived in present-day North Rhine-Westphalia, just outside what was then the Roman Empire. The Romans originally reported them living east of the lower Rhine river, in a large area centred around present day Münster stretching from both sides of the upper River Ems in the north, to both sides of the River Lippe in the south. At its greatest extent, their territory apparently stretched between the vicinities of the Rhine in the west and the Teutoburg Forest and Weser river in the east.

During the aggressive Roman campaigns of Augustus and his dynasty east of the Rhine into Germania Magna, the Bructeri were among the most dangerous enemies of Rome along with the Cherusci and Chatti. Compared to many neighbouring tribes they had a relatively large population and homeland, and could put significant armies into the field. Unlike many other tribes in their region they also continued to be an important power even during the centuries after the Romans consolidated their control of the region.

By the end of the first century AD the Bructeri were forced to move south of the Lippe, probably absorbing the remnants of the previous inhabitants, the Sicambri and Marsi. The Ruhr was now their southern boundary separating them from the Tencteri. By the beginning of the fourth century AD they were living still further south, facing Roman Cologne, probably having absorbed their long-time neighbours the Tencteri. In this period the Bructeri were categorized by at least some Roman authors using the new term, "Franks". In the eighth century, tribes known as the Boructuare and Borthari are mentioned as living in Germany, and there may have been some connection between these and the much earlier Bructeri.

== Name ==
Bructeri is the Latin form, equivalent to Greek Βρούκτεροι, Broukteroi, although surviving manuscripts of Ptolemy's Geography have Βουσάκτεροι, Bousakteroi.

In the first century forms such as Latin Bructeri and Greek Βρoύκτερoι dominate, but much later names seem to evolved from those which began with Bo-: Borhter, Borahtra, and Boructuarii. The original name is formed in a way which is notably similar to the neighbouring Tencteri. Concerning the name's first component there have been several proposals to connect the name to Germanic languages, as listed by Neumann:

- One proposal is that the name's first component is related to the verb "to break" and would have meant "defection, resistance, rebellion", perhaps indicating that they were "the rebels" - either as a character trait, or because of some historical event involving the tribe.
- Another proposals is that it is related to Middle High German brogen ("to rise, display pride"), ultimately derived from an Indo-European root bheregh- meaning "high", or "elevated". This root could make it related to Germanic words referring to fortifications, but Neumann considers this explanation unlikely because of the exact form of the Bructeri name.
- Thirdly, the name may arise from the Germanic root bruk-, meaning "useful, beneficial".
- A fourth proposal listed by Neumann is that the word derives from a proposed Indo-European root bhr̥g- meaning "brushwood", or "thicket".

== First century ==
The Bructeri were one of the larger Germanic peoples who, like the coastal Frisii and Chauci, were divided by the geographer Strabo, writing in about 20 AD, into major and minor divisions. He described the Lippe river running through the territory of the lesser Bructeri (Βουσάκτεροι), about 600 stadia from the Rhine - implying that the Bructeri did not border on the Rhine themselves. Ptolemy's much later geography, written in the second century AD, clearly used older sources such as Strabo, and also divided the Bructeri into lesser and greater sections. Ptolemy, however, placed the Lesser Bructeri on the Rhine just inland of the coastal Frisii who lived just beyond the Rhine mouths, and the greater Bructeri between the Ems and the Weser, to the south of a part of the Chauci.

In surviving Roman works, the first mention of the Bructeri was in the autumn of 12 BC, when Drusus the Elder fought the Bructeri's boats on the Ems River with his fleet. Petrokovits argues that this implies that the Bructeri must have lived north of Rheine on the Ems at this time, in order for the river to be big enough for a naval battle.

In 4 AD, Velleius Paterculus described how Tiberius crossed the Rhine that year in what is now the Netherlands and attacked, according to the badly transcribed text, “cam ui faciat Tuari Bructeri”. According to modern interpretations, this is intended to list first either the Chamavi or Cananefates, then the Chattuari who must have been next, and then the Bructeri. From there they went still further to attack the Cherusci. These peoples are therefore believed to have been neighbours of each other, running from west to east.

Based upon reports of the aftermath, in 9 AD the Bructeri must have been part of the alliance under the leadership of Arminius that defeated the Roman general Varus and annihilated his three legions at the Battle of Teutoburg Forest. In 11 AD, Tiberius probably marched from present-day Neuss on the Rhine, to defeat the southern Bructeri living near the Lippe.

Several years later in 14 AD Germanicus attacked the Marsi at a holy site called Tamfana. The Bructeri, Tubantes, and Usipetes, who presumably all lived close by, attempted to ambush the Romans during their return from this slaughter, but it did not work.

In 15 AD, during Germanicus’ summer campaign, the Romans clashed with the Bructeri twice. Aulus Caecina Severus led 40 cohorts through the territory of the northern Bructeri to the Ems, showing that the Bructeri at this time had settlements west of that river. The Bructeri resisted but were defeated by one of the generals serving under Germanicus, Lucius Stertinius. Among the booty captured by Stertinius was the eagle standard of Legio XIX that had been lost at Teutoburg Forest. The Romans then turned to the rest of the Bructeri country. According to Tacitus, the "troops were then marched to the furthest frontier of the Bructeri, and all the country between the rivers Amisia [Ems] and Luppia [Lippe] was ravaged, not far from the forest of Teutoburgium, where the remains of Varus and his legions were said to lie unburied". Bructeri prisoners were paraded alongside other Germanic captives in Germanicus’ triumph in 17 AD.

The Bructeri continued to be an important power although Rome now had a powerful grip on the region. In 58 AD, they were moving to support the Amsivarii, who had been ejected from their lands by the Chauci, when the Romans opposed any such settlements of this tribe near the Rhine. The Bructeri withdrew when they realized the determination of the Roman governor.

In 69-70 AD the Bructeri participated in the Batavian rebellion, together with the Batavians, Tencteri and Frisii, against the Romans. Throughout the conflict the Bructeri prophetess Veleda played an important role as a spiritual leader of the rising. Tacitus reported that she was long regarded by many as a divinity. She foretold the success of the Germani against the Roman legions during this revolt. A Roman Munius Lupercus was sent to offer her gifts but was murdered on the road. The inhabitants of Cologne, the Ubii, asked for her as an arbiter; "they were not, however, allowed to approach or address Veleda herself". Tacitus reported that "to inspire them with more respect they were prevented from seeing her. She dwelt in a lofty tower, and one of her relatives, chosen for the purpose, conveyed, like the messenger of a divinity, the questions and answers".

In 70 AD during this revolt, Tacitus mentions that the Bructeri participated in two battles. During a battle near Trier on the Moselle they were on the left, together with the Tencteri. In the battle at Castra Vetera near present-day Xanten, across from where the Lippe enters the Rhine, a column of Bructeri were stationed on a dam which the rebels made into the river, in order to create marshy conditions. They swam from there into the main fight, creating confusion, but the legions were later able to hold their line, while a cavalry unit found a way to attack the rebel's rear. The Bructeri were probably also involved in the capture of the Roman flagship on the Rhine, which was rowed up the Lippe to be presented as a gift to Veleda.

Some years after the revolt, Rutilius Gallicus, Roman governor of Germania Inferior in about 76–78 AD, invaded the territory of the Bructeri, captured Veleda and took her to Italy.

Probably in 97 AD, Vestricius Spurinna, Roman governor of Germania Inferior at that time, restored a deposed Bructeri king to power, with military support, threatening war if the Bructeri would attempt to reverse this. Pliny the Younger (died 113) mentioned in a letter (2.7) that in his time "a triumphal statue was decreed by the Senate to Vestricius Spurinna", at the notion of the emperor, because he "had brought the King of the Bructeri into his Realm by force of War; and even subdu'd that rugged Nation, by the Sight and Terror of it, the most honourable kind of Victory".

At about the same time, not long before 98 AD, the Bructeri were invaded by their neighbours the Chamavi and Angrivarii. Tacitus reported that more than 60,000 of the Bructeri fell, and the country was totally annihilated, "offering delight to Roman eyes", writing: "May the tribes, I pray, ever retain if not love for us [Romans], at least hatred for each other; for while [...], fortune can give no greater boon than discord among our foes."

Modern historians generally believe that Tacitus exaggerated. The Bructeri continued to be an important people in the region, but they appear to have lost their large territories north of the Lippe, and moved into new areas south of it. It might have been in this period, if not earlier, that they moved into areas previously belonging to the Sicambri, who had been expelled earlier by the Romans, including areas near the bank of the Rhine. The Marsi, who also lived in this area, no longer appear in records and their population probably merged into the Bructeri. Tacitus reports that the Tencteri were their neighbours to the south in his time, around 100 AD.

== Later antiquity ==
After a long period of Roman dominance in the region, during the Crisis of the Third Century, both the Roman written record and archaeological evidence indicate that Rome began to lose control of the Lower Rhine region, and the tribes facing them there, began to be referred to as "Franks".

In 308 AD, Constantine the Great executed two "kings of Francia", Ascaric and Merogaisus, who violated the peace after the death of his father Constantius, and then "so that the enemy should not merely grieve over the punishment of their kings" made a devastating raid on the Bructeri, now specifically named, and built a bridge over the Rhine at Cologne to "lord it over the remnants of a shattered nation". The later "4th" panegyric of 321 AD lists Bructeri, Chamavi, Cherusci, Lancionae, Alamanni, and Tubantes as peoples Constantine had fought against successfully, and who eventually formed an alliance against him. Several or all of these people were probably also involved in the major field battle on the Rhine in 313 AD, which is reported in the "12th" panegyric.

In a list of barbarian nations under Roman domination the Laterculus Veronensis, which was made about 314 AD, Saxons and Franks are listed separately from several of the older Rhineland tribal names including the Chamavi ("Camari"), Cattuari ("Gallouari") Amsiuari, Angriuari, Bructeri, and Cati.

In 392 AD, according to a citation by Gregory of Tours, Sulpicius Alexander reported that Arbogast crossed the Rhine to punish the Franks for incursions into Gaul. He first devastated the territory of the Bricteri, near the bank of the Rhine, then the Chamavi, apparently their neighbours. Neither of these tribes confronted him. The Ampsivarii and the Chatti however were under military leadership of the Frankish princes Marcomer and Sunno and they appeared "on the ridges of distant hills". At this time the Bructeri apparently lived near Cologne.

In the Peutinger map, the Bructeri also appear as a distinct entity on the opposite side of the Rhine to Cologne and Bonn. They are called the Burcturi, and they had Franks to their north, and Suevi to their south. This has been interpreted to mean that the Bructeri had moved into the area previously inhabited by the Tencteri and Usipetes, which had in the time of Caesar been inhabited by the Ubii (who had in turn long ago crossed the Rhine to inhabit Cologne as Roman citizens during imperial times).

Sidonius Apollinaris, in his Poems, VII, lists the Bructeri among the allies who crossed the Rhine into Gaul under Attila in 451 AD, and then fought against the Roman allies at the Battle of the Catalaunian Fields. But it is possible, according for example to E. A. Thompson that Sidonius included names of historical tribes, for effect. Many Franks in any case certainly fought on the Roman side, against Attila.

== Boructuari, Borahtra and Borthari ==
Procopius writing in the 550s, described the Arboruchoi (Αρβόρυχοι) as a Christian people living in Gaul next to the Franks on the lower Rhine during the time of Clovis I (c. 490). They are most often seen as referring to the Armorici, which was a term that could be used for the Romanized Gauls living near the English channel in this period. However, it has also been proposed that this word evolved from the name of the Bructeri. According to Procopius, they were from Gaul but fought on the Roman side against the Franks before joining and merging with them. This proposal depends on a misspelling by Procopius, of Arboruchoi for Arboruchtoi.

At the beginning of the eighth century, Bede in his Ecclesiastical History of the English People, written in Latin, lists the Boructuari among the peoples "from whom the Angles and Saxons who now live in Britain derive their origin". In the same passage Bede also lists the Frisians, Rugians, Danes, Huns and continental Saxons. Bede also reported that Saint Suitbert tried to convert these Boructuari to Christianity in the late 7th century, when he was bishop of the Frisians, but that during this period they were attacked by the Saxons. In the Old English translation the name became Boructuare or Boruchtuare. Although Bede does not explain where these people lived, this name is usually connected with that of the Bructeri, including the addition of a common suffix -uari found in the names of Germanic tribes, and meaning "inhabitants" or "wards" of a land. The name would thus represent the people living in the old land of the Bructeri. While Ian Wood, for example, accepts these Boructuari as a likely Frankish component in the Anglo-Saxon settlement of Britain, Walter Pohl and Matthias Springer have argued that Bede may have used his specific spelling based on his knowledge of the Bructeri in Roman literature.

Springer in particular has argued that the Old English Boruchtuare seems related to the later medieval gau or pagus (district) name, Borahtra. And despite this gau being between Lippe and Ruhr, near where the Bructeri lived, on the basis of linguistic considerations he believes this term is not derived from the word "Bructeri". Medieval spellings for this gau include Borotra, Bortergo, Boractron, Boroctra, Borhtergo.

About 738, the Borthari were one of the peoples of Germania addressed in a letter of Pope Gregory III, the others being the Hessians, Thuringians, Nistresi, Wedrecii, Lognai, Suduodi and Graffelti. The letter was carried by Boniface. In it, Gregory advises the peoples and their princes to accept Boniface's religious authority and to abandon the pagan customs they had rejected at baptism. The Borthari are usually identified with Bede's Boructuari.

It has been proposed that the name of the Bructeri is preserved in the names Großbrüchter and Kleinbrüchter, in the municipality Helbedündorf in Thuringia. The earliest attestation of this placename is Borahtride. Other etymologies are also proposed.

== Bibliography ==
- Bede (1843), Giles (ed.), The Complete Works Of Venerable Bede, vol. 3
- Bede (1890), The Old English version of Bede's Ecclesiastical history of the English people, vol. 2, translated by Miller
- Clay, John-Henry (2010), In the Shadow of Death: Saint Boniface and the Conversion of Hessia, 721–54, Brepols
- Lanting; van der Plicht (2010), "De ^{14}C-chronologie van de Nederlandse Pre- en Protohistorie VI: Romeinse tijd en Merovingische periode, deel A: historische bronnen en chronologische schema's", Palaeohistoria, vol. 51/52, pp. 27–168, ISBN 9789077922736
- Liccardo, Salvatore (2023), Old Names, New Peoples: Listing Ethnonyms in Late Antiquity, Brill, doi:10.1163/9789004686601, ISBN 978-90-04-68660-1
- Windy A. McKinney (2011), Creating a gens Anglorum: Social and Ethnic Identity in Anglo-Saxon England through the Lens of Bede's Historia Ecclesiastica (PDF) (PhD diss.), University of York
- Neumann, Günter (1978), "Brukterer § 1. Sprachliches", in Johannes Hoops; Heinrich Beck (eds.), Reallexikon der Germanischen Altertumskunde, vol. 3 (2 ed.), Walter de Gruyter, pp. 581–582, ISBN 978-3-11-006512-1
- Nixon, C E V; Rodgers, Barbara Saylor (1994). In praise of later Roman emperors: the Panegyrici Latini. Berkeley: University of California Press. ISBN 0-520-08326-1 – via Internet Archive.
- Petrokovits, Harald (1978), "Brukterer §2. Historisches", in Johannes Hoops; Heinrich Beck (eds.), Reallexikon der Germanischen Altertumskunde, vol. 3 (2 ed.), Walter de Gruyter, pp. 582–585, ISBN 978-3-11-006512-1
- Pohl, Walter (1997), "Ethnic Names and Identities in the British Isles: A Comparative Perspective", in John Hines (ed.), The Anglo-Saxons from the Migration Period to the Eighth Century: An Ethnographic Perspective, Boydell Press, pp. 7–32
- Poly, Jean-Pierre (2016), "Freedom, Warriors' Bond, Legal Book: The Lex Salica Between Barbarian Custom and Roman Law", Clio et Thémis, 11: 1–25
- Roymans, Nico; Heeren, Stijn (2021), "Romano-Frankish interaction in the Lower Rhine frontier zone from the late 3rd to the 5th century – Some key archaeological trends explored", Germania, 99: 133–156, doi:10.11588/ger.2021.92212
- Runde, Ingo (1998). "Die Franken und Alemannen vor 500. Ein chronologischer Überblick". In Geuenich, Dieter (ed.). Die Franken und die Alemannen bis zur "Schlacht bei Zülpich" (496/97). Reallexikon der Germanischen Altertumskunde - Ergänzungsbände. Vol. 19. De Gruyter. ISBN 978-3-11-015826-7.
- Schmidt, Ludwig (1940), Die Westgermanen, C.H. Beck, ISBN 340602212X
- Schönfeld (1911), "Bructeri", Wörterbuch der altgermanischen personen- und völkernamen, p. 54
- Schütte (1917), Ptolemy's maps of northern Europe, a reconstruction of the prototypes, Kjøbenhavn, H. Hagerup
- Springer, Matthias (2004). Die Sachsen (in German). Kohlhammer Verlag. ISBN 978-3-17-023227-3.
- Uslar, Rafael (1978), "Brukterer §3. Archäologisches", in Johannes Hoops; Heinrich Beck (eds.), Reallexikon der Germanischen Altertumskunde, vol. 3 (2 ed.), Walter de Gruyter, pp. 582–585, ISBN 978-3-11-006512-1
- Wood, Ian N. (2003), "Beyond satraps and ostriches: political and social structures of the Saxons in the early Carolingian period", The continental Saxons from the migration period to the tenth century. An ethnografic perspective, Boydell, pp. 271–297, ISBN 978-1-84383-026-9
