= Angrivarii =

Germanic people in Roman times

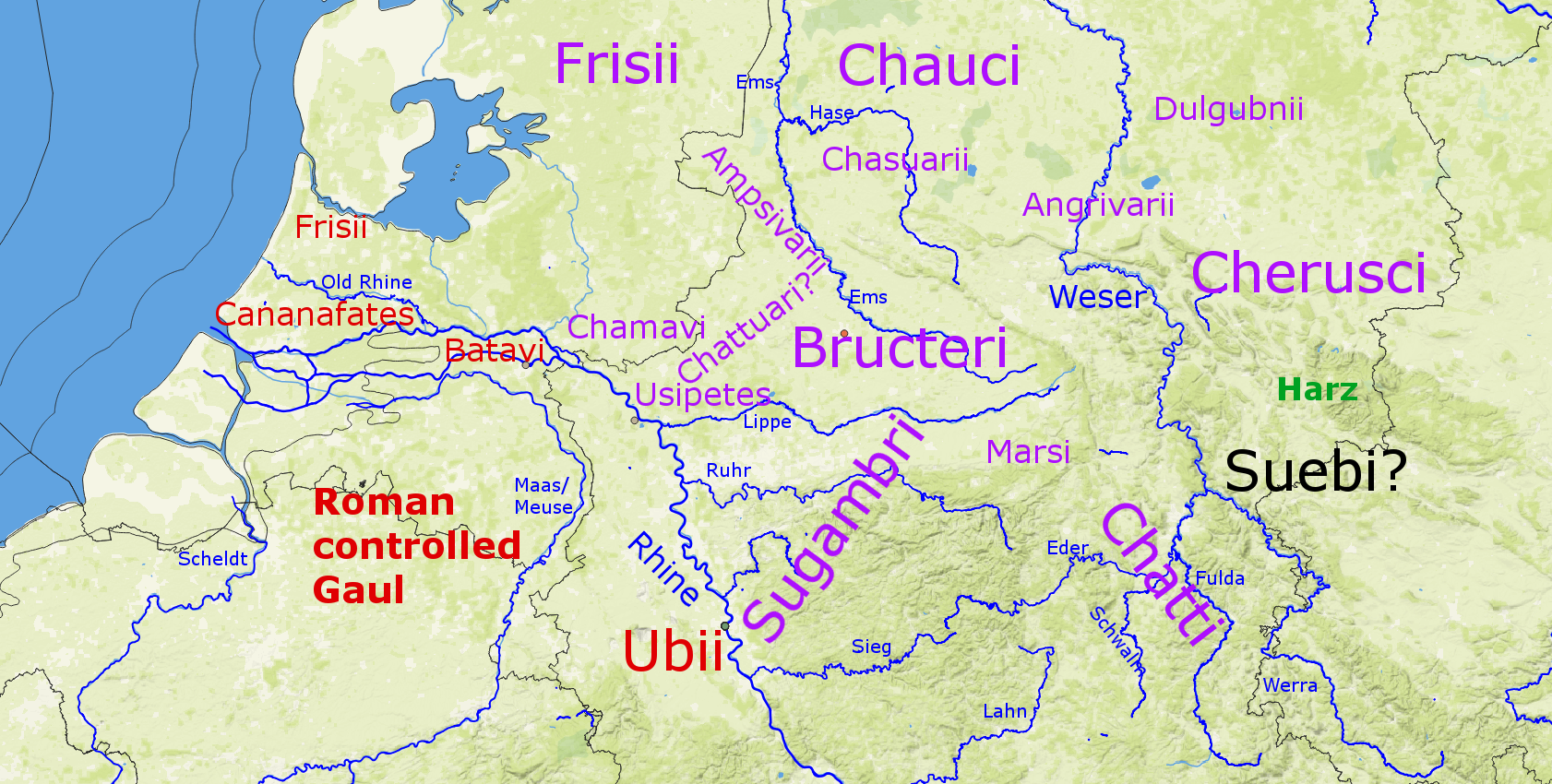
The approximate locations of the Sicambri and Bructeri in about 10 BC

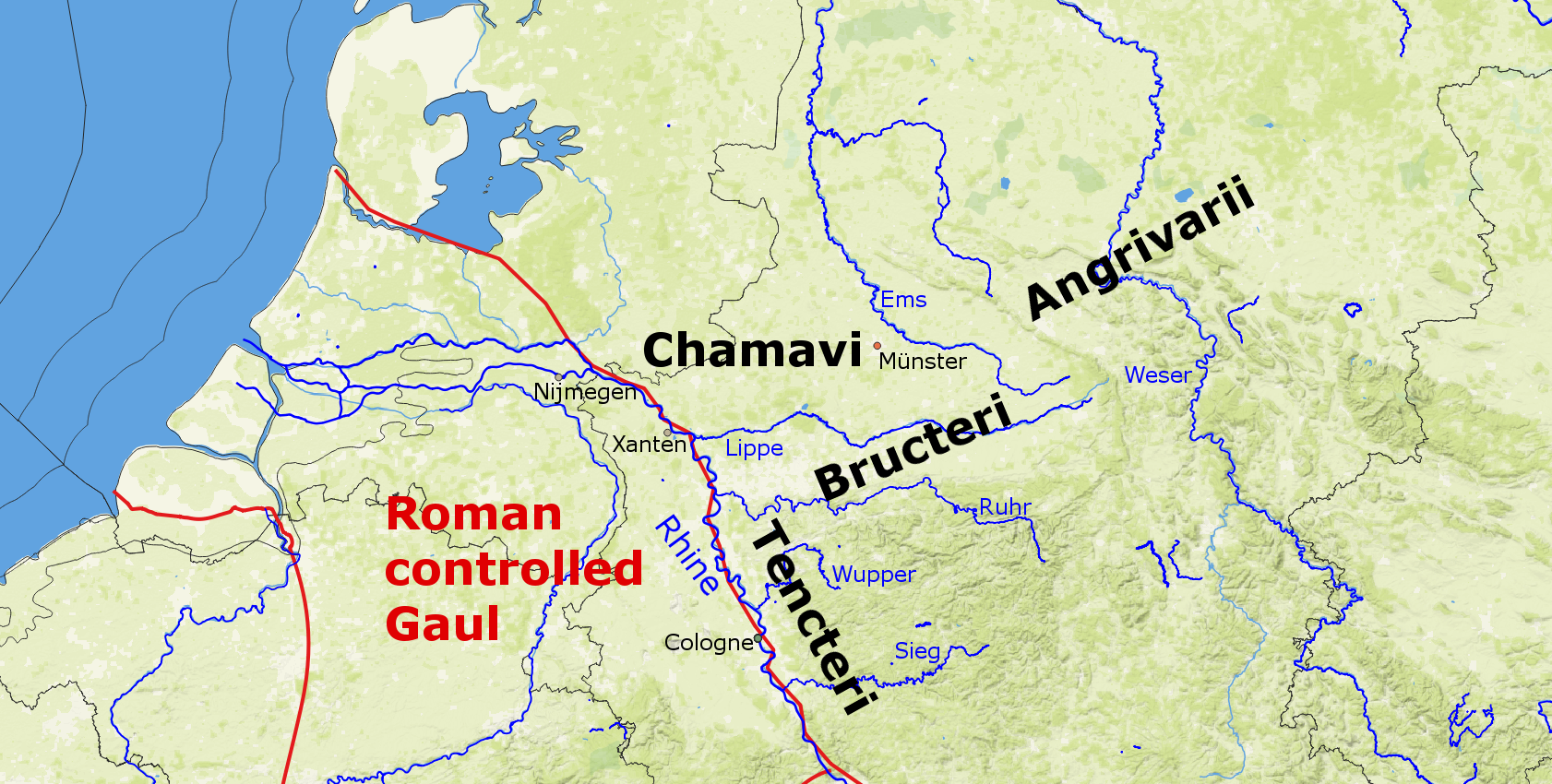
Approximate positions of tribes in about 100 AD

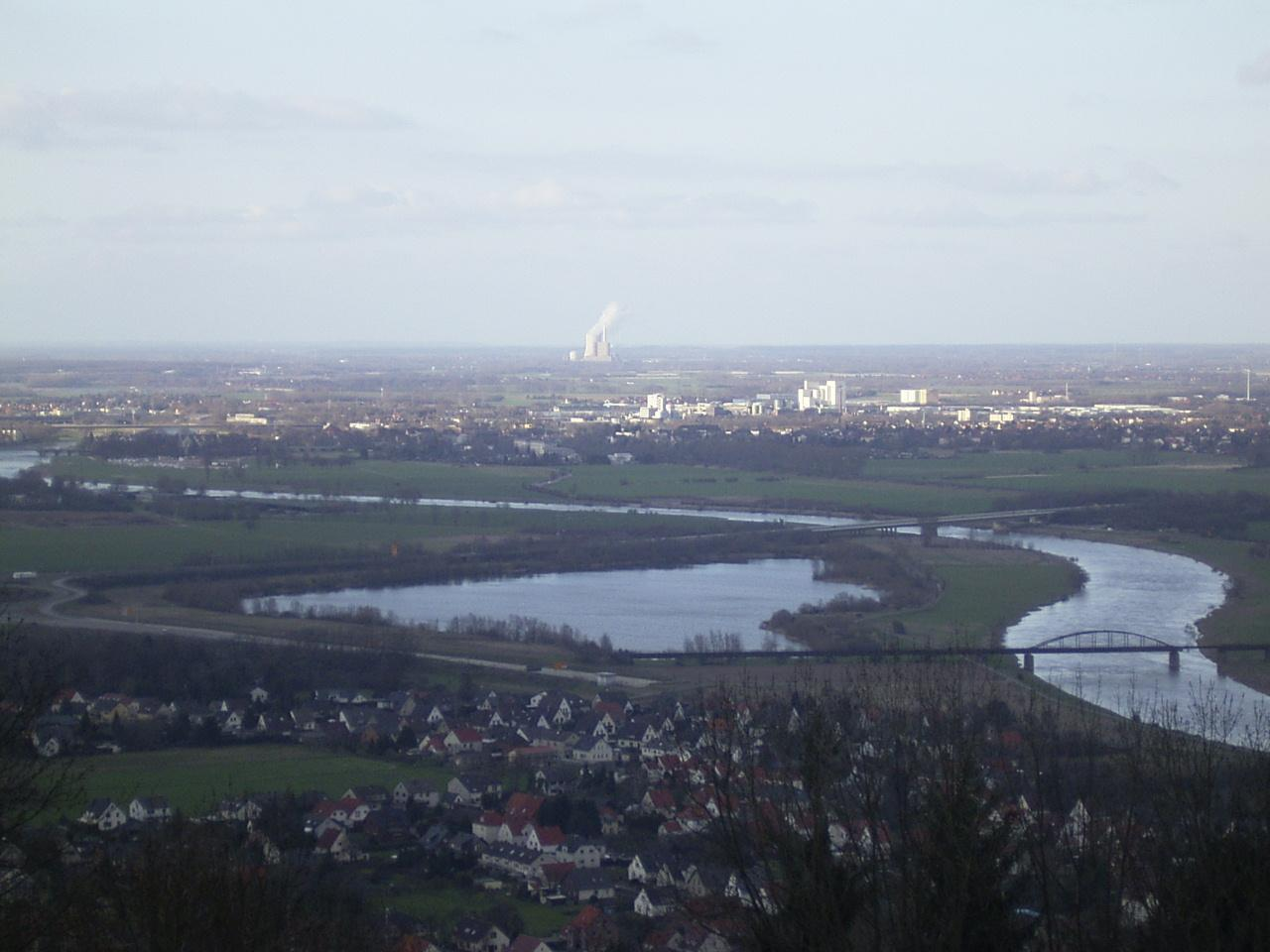
A view of the country around Minden, part of ancient Engern

The Angrivarii were a Germanic people who lived in what is now northern Germany in the time of the Roman Empire. They lived near the lower Weser river, with the Chauci between them and the North Sea coast, and the Cherusci to their south.

They were part of the Germanic alliance led by Arminius which defeated the Romans at the Battle of the Teutoburg Forest in 9 AD.

The Angrivarii lived in an area which was later called Angria in the Middle Ages, which was a major part of the Carolingian Duchy of Saxony. In Modern German it is still called "Engern". Both names probably derive from geographical terminology.

== Location ==
In his Germania Tacitus described the Angrivarii and their western neighbours the Chamavi living east of the Frisii who lived towards the Rhine river which was the official border of the Roman Empire, and behind them, further from the Romans, were "the Dulgubini and Chasuarii, and other tribes not equally famous". The Chasuarii probably lived near the Hase river, north of them, and the Dulgubini probably lived further east towards the Elbe. North of all these peoples lived the Chauci, living along the North Sea coast in what is now Germany.

Among the more detailed mentions of the Angrivarii which Tacitus makes in his Annals, he describes them also as neighbours to the powerful Cherusci people, of Arminius, who apparently lived east of them. They had built a dike to mark the boundary, and this was west of the Weser.

Tacitus also notes in his Germania that together with the Chamavi, the Angrivarii had invaded the lands formerly held by the Bructeri to their south, the Bructeri having been expelled and utterly destroyed by an alliance of neighboring peoples.... The Bructeri had lived near the Ems and Lippe rivers, between the Rhine and Weser. This occurred after the battle of the Teutoburg Forest.

Nevertheless, in the second century CE, the geographer Ptolemy reported that the Bructeri were still living in the same approximate area, with a lesser group of Bructeri residing near the mouth of the Rhine, among the Frisii, and a larger group located just south of the coastal Chauci, who lived between the Ems and Weser rivers. He places the Chamavi (Chamai) south of these Bructeri. He reports the Angrivarii east of the Weser river, just south of the "greater" Chauci who lived on the coast between Weser and Elbe. East of the Angrivarii, he positions the Langobardi (εἶτα Λακκοβάρδοι), and he places the Dulgubnii south of the Langobardi (ὑφ’ οὓς Δουλγούμνιοι). Unfortunately, Ptolemy's positioning of these peoples is confused in various places.

== Name and etymology ==
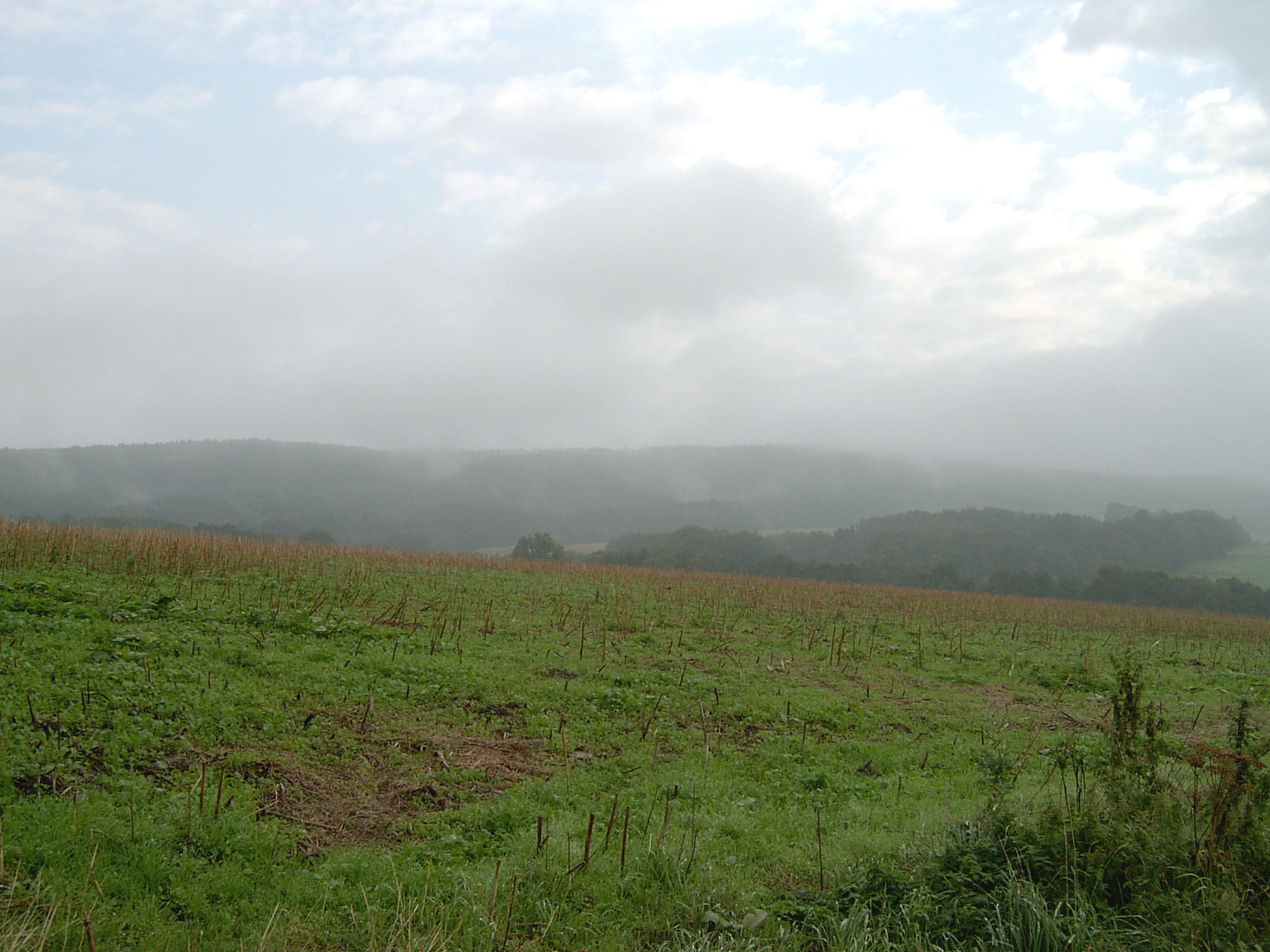
Upland meadow in Wiehengebirge, part of ancient Engern

The name appears earliest in the Annales and Germania of Tacitus as Angrivarii. In Greek, Ptolemy called them the Angriouarroi (Ancient Greek: Ἀνγριουάρροι), which transliterates into Latin Angrivari. In post-classical history the name of the people had a number of different spellings in addition to the ones just mentioned.

The name Angrivarii can be segmented Angri-varii, meaning "the men of Engern", parallel to Ampsi-varii, "the men of the Ems". Engern, their region, is related to a word for meadows, as in modern German "Anger", and appears as a component in placenames around Germany.

Julius Pokorny derives the first element from an Indo-European root *ang-, "to bend, bow." From this root are also derived German Anger, English dialect ing, Danish eng, Swedish äng, Dutch eng/enk, and many other forms in Germanic languages, all meaning "meadow, pasture." Cf. the similar element Angeln.

The second element -varii is most prolific among Germanic tribal names, commonly taken to mean "inhabitants of", "dwellers in". Its precise etymology remains unclear, but there is a consensus that it cannot be derived from the PIE root *wih_{x}rós, "man", surviving in English "were-wolf".

Their geographical-based name is associated with the 8th century region called Angria (Angaria, Angeriensis, Aggerimensis, and Engaria), which was one of four subdivisions of Old Saxony (the others were Westfalahi, Ostfalahi, and Nordalbingia). This region is now referred to in modern German as Engern, and it corresponds reasonably well with the area where the Angrivarii lived, comprising most of the country surrounding the middle Weser, including both flat land, as around Minden, and low hills (Holzminden).

== Classical history ==
Although the Angrivarii receive brief mention in Ptolemy (2.10) and the Germania of Tacitus (33), they appear mainly at several locations in Annales. They were involved marginally in the wars fought by the talented Germanicus Caesar on behalf of his uncle Tiberius, emperor of Rome, against the perpetrators of the massacre of three Roman legions in the Battle of the Teutoburg Forest, in the year 9.

The wars began in the last years of the reign of Augustus, the first emperor of Rome. Augustus died an old but respected man in the year 14 and was celebrated with much pomp and splendor. He left a document to be read to the senate posthumously, expressly forbidding extension of the empire beyond the Rhine. News of the will was welcomed by the Germans, thinking it gave them a free hand in the region. Germanicus found it necessary to pacify the border, which he did by a combination of scorched earth raids and offers of alliance with Rome - in short, stick and carrot. These raids also kept the army of the Lower Rhine distracted from the possibility of mutiny, which had broken out on Augustus's death and only been quelled by concessions and executions.

For punitive expeditions, Germanicus used the Ems river, which flowed from the heart of the country occupied by the tribes that became the Franks. These were still under Arminius, who had led the German confederation to victory in 9. Unlike Arminius' native tribe, the Cherusci, the loyalty of the other tribes in the confederation was at best equivocal.

The Angrivarii's defection or revolt (defectio) in the middle of Arminius's renewed operations against the Teutoburg Forest must have been secured in advance by Germanicus. Even if it was not, a cavalry attack soon brought the Angrivarii's capitulation. Soon afterwards, however, they are back in alliance with the Cherusci and opposition to the Romans, setting an ambush at the Cheruscan border, which was a high dirt embankment. They hid their cavalry in the woods and stationed their infantry on the reverse slope of the bank. The Romans had intelligence of the plan beforehand. They assaulted the embankment, preceding their assault with volleys from slings and spears thrown by machines. Driving the Angrivarii from the bank, they went on to pursue the cavalry in the woods. Once again, the Angrivarii were totally routed.

Once the Cherusci had been dealt with, Germanicus turned his attention to the Angrivarii. They, however, surrendered unconditionally to the general sent by Germanicus and placed themselves in the status of suppliants, begging for mercy, which Germanicus granted. This later reaped dividends for the Angrivarii, who played a role in securing the return of ships and men lost in a North Sea storm, which scattered the Roman fleet upon the shore of hostile or neutral Germanic tribes.

On May 26 of the year 17, Germanicus celebrated a triumph for his victory over lower Germany, and his uncle sent him off to the east. Arminius died, and the Angrivarii, the other west Germans, and their successor tribes continued friendly towards Rome, providing it with elite troops and urban and palace police. Together with the Cherusci and the Chatti, the Angrivari belong to the three tribes that Tacitus particularly emphasizes in his account of the triumphal march of Germanicus in 17 AD: "Germanicus Caesar, celebrated his triumph over the Cherusci, Chatti, and Angrivarii, and the other tribes which extend as far as the Elbe." However, they do not appear in the list of peoples given by Pliny who were paraded in Rome during that triumph.

In the Laterculus Veronensis the Angrivarii (Angri Angriuari) appear in the list barbarian peoples who have spread under the Roman emperors. They are listed between the Amsiuari, who were neighbours of the Angrivarii in the first century, and the otherwise unknown Fleui whose name seems to indicate that they lived near Lake Flevo, where the Frisii had previously lived, in what is now the Netherlands.

== See also ==
- Barbarian invasions
- Angrivarian Wall
- Battle of the Angrivarian Wall

== Sources ==
- Lanting; van der Plicht (2010), "De ^{14}C-chronologie van de Nederlandse Pre- en Protohistorie VI: Romeinse tijd en Merovingische periode, deel A: historische bronnen en chronologische schema's", Palaeohistoria, vol. 51/52, p. 62, ISBN 978-90-77922-73-6
- Liccardo, Salvatore (2023), Old Names, New Peoples: Listing Ethnonyms in Late Antiquity, Brill, doi:10.1163/9789004686601
- Neumann, Günter (1989), "Engern", in Beck, Heinrich; Geuenich, Dieter; Steuer, Heiko (eds.), Reallexikon der Germanischen Altertumskunde, vol. 7 (2 ed.), De Gruyter, ISBN 978-3-11-011445-4
- Wenskus, Reinhard (1973), "Angriwarier", in Beck, Heinrich; Geuenich, Dieter; Steuer, Heiko (eds.), Reallexikon der Germanischen Altertumskunde, vol. 1 (2 ed.), De Gruyter, ISBN 978-3-11-004489-8
