= Chauci =

Roman-era inhabitants of the German North Sea coast

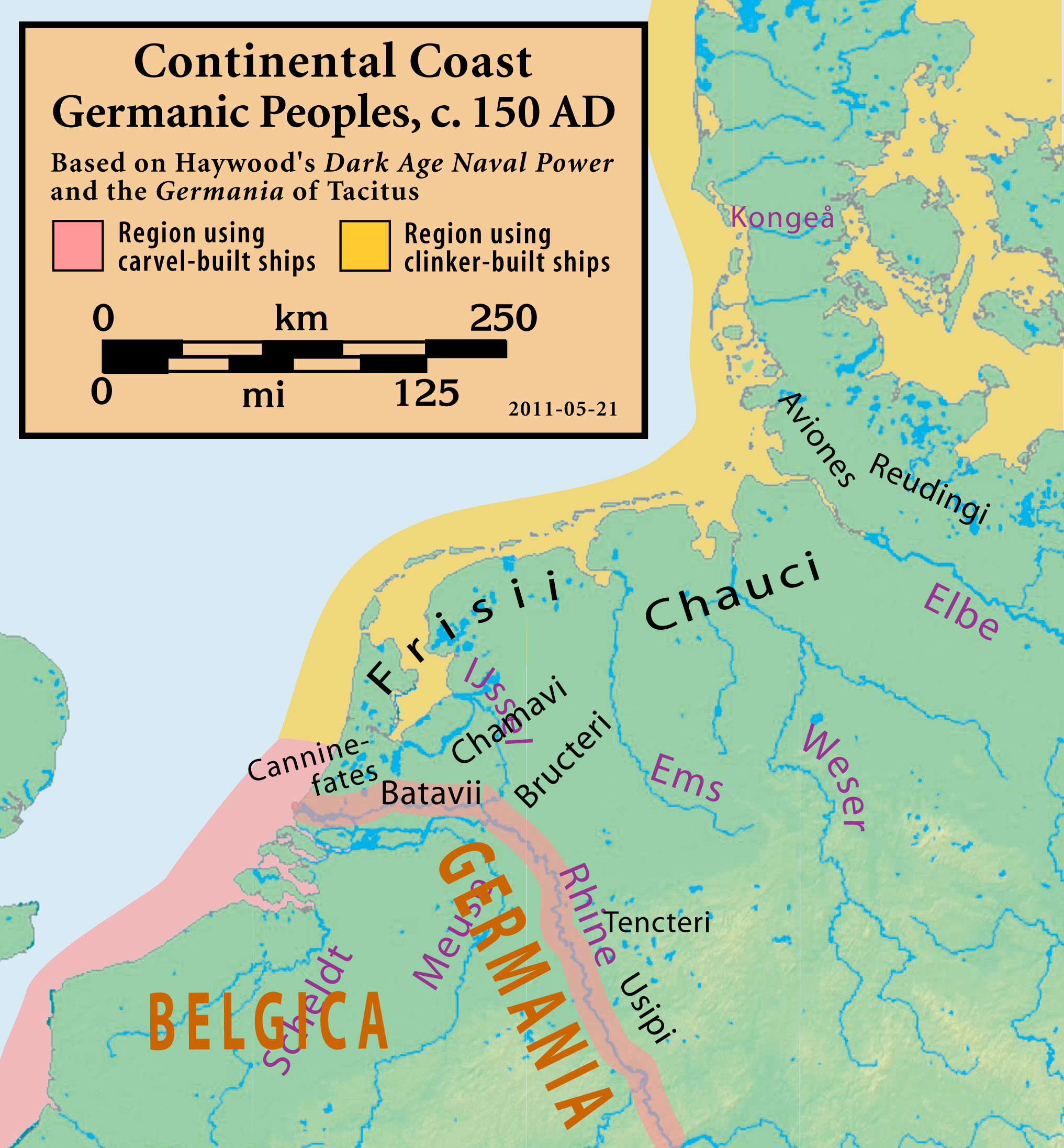

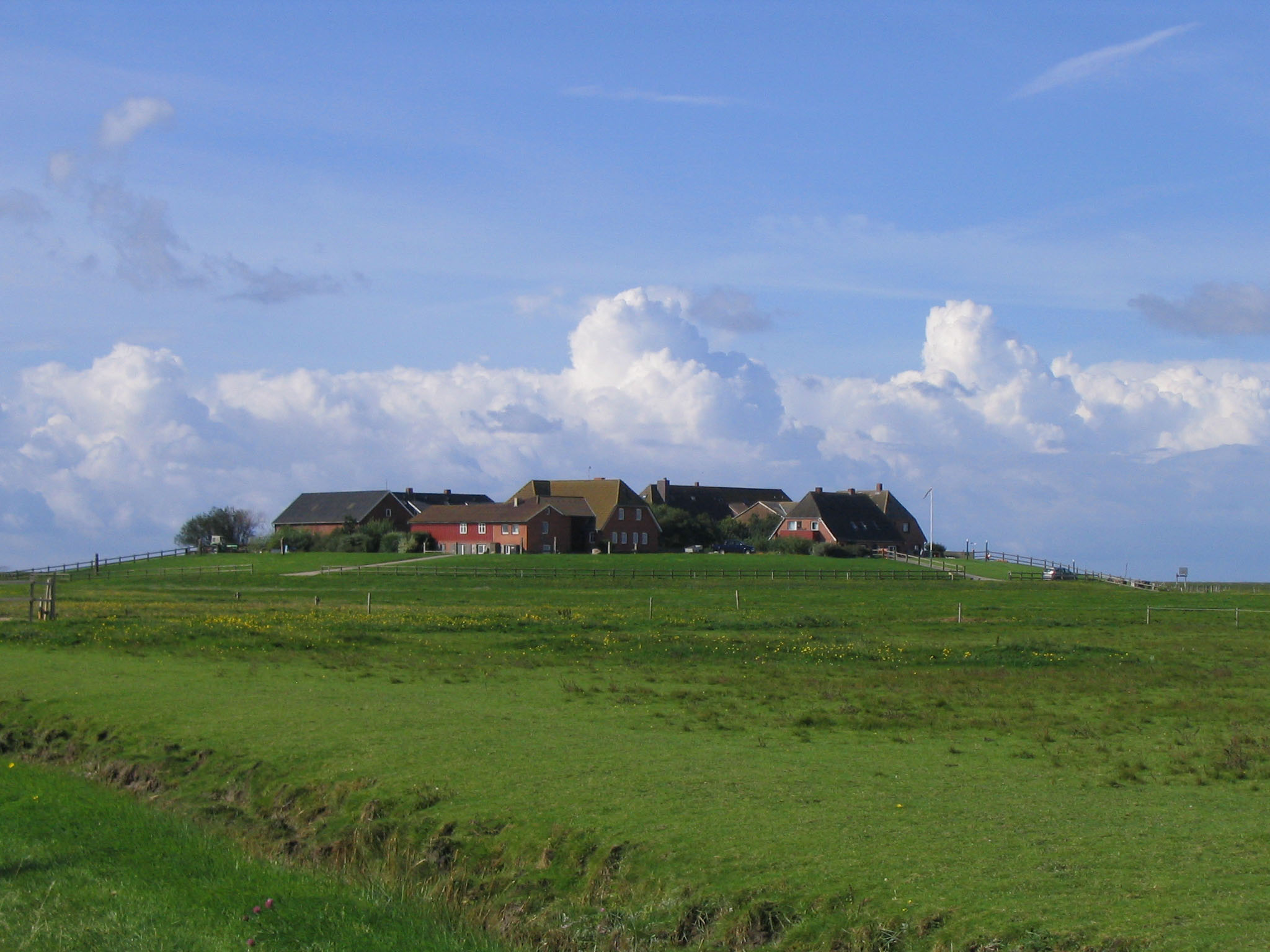
Terpen on hallig Hooge

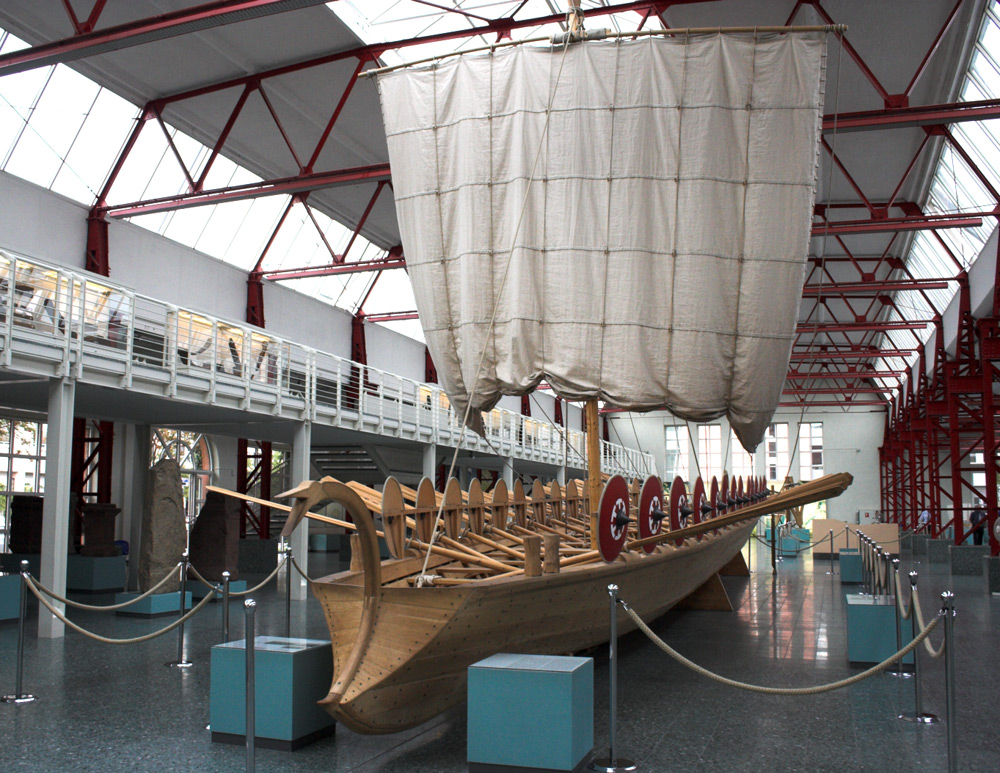
Reconstruction of a fluvial boat of the Classis Germanica (Rhine flotilla) in the first century AD.

The Chauci were a Roman era Germanic people living in the coastal region between the Rivers Ems and Elbe, in what is now northern Germany. Along the coast they lived on artificial mounds called terpen, built high enough to remain dry during the highest tide. A dense population of Chauci lived further inland, and they are presumed to have lived in a manner similar to the lives of the other Germanic peoples of the region.

The Chauci entered the historical record in descriptions of them by classical Roman sources late in the first century BC in the context of Roman military campaigns and sea raiding. For the next 200 years the Chauci provided Roman auxiliaries through treaty obligations, but they also appear in their own right in concert with other Germanic tribes, opposing the Romans. Accounts of wars therefore mention the Chauci on both sides of the conflict, though the actions of troops under treaty obligation were separate from the policies of the tribe.

The Chauci lost their separate identity in the third century when they merged with the Saxons, after which time they were considered to be Saxons. The circumstances of the merger are an unsettled issue of scholarly research.

== Classical descriptions ==
Pliny the Elder (AD 23–79) had visited the coastal region and described the people called the greater and lesser Chauci who lived in a country without trees in the north. Writing around 70 AD he described them as "wretched natives" living on a barren coast in small cottages (or huts) on hilltops, or on mounds of turf built high enough to stay dry during the highest tide (known today as terpen). They fished for food, and unlike their neighbors (i.e., those living inland, away from the coast) they had no cattle, and had nothing to drink except rainwater caught in ditches. They used a type of dried mud (i.e., "surface peat") as fuel for cooking and heating. He also mentioned their spirit of independence, saying that even though they had nothing of value, they would deeply resent any attempt to conquer them.

Apart from the coast, Pliny also mentioned the Chauci in his list of peoples living within the islands of the Rhine delta. Modern scholars are sceptical about this.

Pliny categorized the Chauci, together with Cimbri and Teutoni as members of a sub-group of Germanic peoples called the Ingaevones. A generation later, Tacitus also reported the Ingaevones as a major division of the Germani, and located them "near the ocean".

Tacitus, writing around 100 AD, described Chauci homeland as large, bordering on the Frisii in the west, stretching along the coast, and then bending inland in his time so that they now shared a border with the Chatti, in an area west of the Cherusci homeland. He called them the noblest of the Germanic peoples, living peacefully despite their dense population and a large stock of weapons and horses.

Only the second century geographer Ptolemy gives seemingly clear boundaries to the Chauci territory, although his description of Germania is generally seen faulty, and heavily influenced by the patching together of different types of older sources. He defines the boundary between the Frisii and Chauci as the Ems river, and places the "lesser Chauci" between the Ems and Weser, with a part of the Bructeri to their south. The "greater Chauci" are placed between the Weser and Elbe, with the Angrivarii, Dulgubnii and Langobards to their south. To their east across the Elbe he reported a tribe which surviving manuscripts spell either as Saxones or Axones.

== Classical Roman history ==
The record is incomplete. The bulk of historical information about the Chauci is from the Annals of Tacitus, written in 117. Many parts of his works have not survived, including an entire section covering the years AD 38–46, as well as the years after AD 69.

The earliest mention of the Chauci is from 12 BC and suggests that they were assisting other Germanic tribes in a war against the Romans. Drusus campaigned against those Germans along the lower Rhine, and after devastating the lands west and north of the Rhine he won over (or defeated or intimidated) the Frisians. He was in the process of attacking the Chauci when his vessels were trapped by an ebb tide. Drusus gave up the attack and withdrew.

=== Aftermath of Teutoburg Forest, c. 15 ===
The Germans under Arminius had destroyed 3 Roman legions under Varus at the Battle of the Teutoburg Forest in AD 9. The Romans recoiled at first but then Germanicus initiated destructive campaigns against those Germans whom the Romans blamed for their defeat. The Chauci were not among them, and were said to have promised aid, and were associated with the Romans in "military fellowship". However, in defeating Arminius' own tribe (the Cherusci) the Romans were unable to capture or kill Arminius, who escaped. There were Chauci among the Roman auxiliaries, and they were rumored to have allowed the escape. In one of the campaigns a Roman fleet (probably riverine, not ocean-going) was broken up by a storm, causing many casualties. Germanicus himself managed to survive by reaching the lands of the Chauci, who provided him with a safe haven. Germanicus' campaigns had resulted in recovery of two of three Aquila lost in the Battle of the Teutoburg Forest defeat; the third legionary standard was recovered in AD 41 by Publius Gabinius from the Chauci during the reign of Claudius, brother of Germanicus.

A parenthetical note concerns the Ampsivarii. They had not supported the German cause led by Arminius in 9 AD and had been ostracized as a result. The Chauci had suffered no such disaffection from the other Germanic tribes in the aftermath of Teutoburg Forest, nor had they alienated the Romans. Many years later, c. AD 58, the Chauci seized upon an opportunity to expel the Ampsivarii and occupy their lands at the mouth of the River Ems, whereby they gained a border with the Frisians to the west.

=== Roman war against Gannascus, c. 47 ===
In AD 47 (and perhaps for some time earlier), the Chauci along with the Frisians were led by a certain Gannascus of the Canninefates. They raided along the then-wealthy coast of Gallia Belgica (i.e., the land south of the Rhine and north of the Rivers Marne and Seine), and the Chauci made inroads into the region that would later become the neighbouring Roman province of Germania Inferior, in the area of the Rhine delta in what is now the southern Netherlands.

Corbulo was made the local Roman military commander. He successfully engaged the Germans on both land and water, occupied the Rhine with his triremes and sent his smaller vessels up the estuaries and canals. The Germanic flotilla was destroyed in a naval engagement, Gannascus was driven out, and Frisian territory was forcibly occupied.

A negotiation between the Romans and Gannascus was arranged under the auspices of the 'Greater Chauci', which the Romans used as an opportunity to assassinate their opponent. The Chauci were outraged by the act of bad faith, so the emperor Claudius forbade further attacks on the Germans in an effort to ease tensions, and the Romans withdrew to the Rhine.

=== Batavian Revolt, c. 69 ===
In AD 69 the Batavi and other tribes rose against Roman rule in the Revolt of the Batavi, becoming a general uprising by all the Germans in the region. Led by Civilis, they inflicted huge casualties on the Romans, including the destruction of a Roman fleet by a Germanic one off the North Sea coast. Led by Cerialis, the Romans gave as good as they had gotten, ultimately forcing a humiliating peace on the Batavi and stationing a legion on their territory.

Both the Chauci and the Frisians had auxiliaries serving under the Romans, and in a siege and assault by Civilis at Colonia Claudia Ara Agrippinensis (at modern Cologne), a cohort of Chauci and Frisians had been trapped and burned. The Chauci had supported Civilis in their own name, providing him with reinforcements.

== Sea raiding ==
The Chauci were one of the most prominent early Germanic sea raiders. They are probable participants in the Germanic flotilla that was destroyed by Drusus in 12 BC. They were raiding the coasts of Roman Belgica in AD 41, long before they participated in further raids of the same coasts under Gannascus in AD 47. It is likely that their raiding was endemic over the years, as the few surviving accounts probably do not reflect all occurrences. Tacitus describes the Chauci as 'peaceful' in his Germania (AD 98), but this is in a passage describing the non-coastal, inland Chauci, whereas sea raiders are necessarily a coastal people.

By the late second century Chauci raiding was ongoing and more serious than before, continuing in the English Channel until their last recorded raids c. 170–175. While there are no historical sources to inform us one way or the other, it is likely that the Chauci continued their raiding and then played a role in the formation of the new Germanic powers, the Franks and Saxons who were raiders in the third century.

There is archaeological evidence of destruction by raiders between 170–200, ranging along the Continental coast down to the Bay of Biscay, to northwest Belgica (e.g., fire destruction at Amiens, Thérouanne, Vendeuil-Caply, Beauvais, Bavai, Tournai, and Arras), to coastal Britain (e.g., fire destruction at the Essex sites of Chelmsford, Billericay, Gestingthorpe, Braintree, Wickford, Kelvedon, Great Chesterford, and Harlow). The perpetrators are unknown, but Chauci raiders are among the prime suspects.

The Romans responded with defensive measures. Caistor-by-Norwich, Chelmsford and Forum Hadriani (present day Voorburg) (the civitas of the Canninefates near The Hague) were all fortified c. 200, and the Romans began a defensive system of protection especially along the coasts of Britain and the Continent. This system would be continually maintained and improved upon, which the Romans would not have done unless there was a continuing threat to be addressed. The system would continue to evolve through the disappearance of Chauci raiders and their replacement by the Frankish and Saxon ones, up to the end of the fourth century. By then it would be known as the Saxon Shore, a name given it by the Notitia Dignitatum.

A passage written by Zosimus has been interpreted as one of the last mentions of the Chauci, and one where they are specifically mentioned as a Saxon group; but it depends upon whether we can equate them with the "Kouadoi" in Zosimus's Greek, a name he had apparently used wrongly. Julian fought against Saxons and Franks, including the Salians, but then allowed the Salians "descended from the Franks" to settle in Toxandria in 358. According to Zosimus, this happened in response to an attack from the sea by the "Kouadoi" Saxons which affected both Romans and Salians, who had been living in the river delta. The "Kouadoi" in this passage are however most commonly believed to be Chamavi (which is what they are called in accounts of the same incidents by Eunapius).

== In literature ==
Beowulf is an Old English heroic poem where the hero (Beowulf) engages in battles with antagonists. Set in long-ago Scandinavia, it makes frequent references to the peoples who are a part of the story, and efforts have been made to connect those peoples with peoples mentioned in ancient historical records. The "Hugas" of the poem are said to be a reference to the Chauci.

== See also ==
- Cauci
- List of Germanic peoples
