= 388 =

388 in various calendars
Gregorian calendar	388; CCCLXXXVIII
Ab urbe condita	1141
Assyrian calendar	5138
Balinese saka calendar	309–310
Bengali calendar	−206 – −205
Berber calendar	1338
Buddhist calendar	932
Burmese calendar	−250
Byzantine calendar	5896–5897
Chinese calendar	丁亥年 (Fire Pig); 3085 or 2878 — to — 戊子年 (Earth Rat); 3086 or 2879
Coptic calendar	104–105
Discordian calendar	1554
Ethiopian calendar	380–381
Hebrew calendar	4148–4149
- Hindu calendars
Vikram Samvat	444–445
Shaka Samvat	309–310
Kali Yuga	3488–3489
Holocene calendar	10388
Iranian calendar	234 BP – 233 BP
Islamic calendar	241 BH – 240 BH
Javanese calendar	271–272
Julian calendar	388; CCCLXXXVIII
Korean calendar	2721
Minguo calendar	1524 before ROC 民前1524年
Nanakshahi calendar	−1080
Seleucid era	699/700 AG
Thai solar calendar	930–931
Tibetan calendar	མེ་མོ་ཕག་ལོ་ (female Fire-Boar); 514 or 133 or −639 — to — ས་ཕོ་བྱི་བ་ལོ་ (male Earth-Rat); 515 or 134 or −638

Year 388 (CCCLXXXVIII) was a leap year starting on Saturday of the Julian calendar. At the time, it was known as the Year of the Consulship of Augustus without colleague (or, less frequently, year 1141 Ab urbe condita). The denomination 388 for this year has been used since the early medieval period, when the Anno Domini calendar era became the prevalent method in Europe for naming years.

== Events ==
=== By place ===
==== Roman Empire ====
- Battle of the Save: Emperor Theodosius I defeats Magnus Maximus near Emona (modern Slovenia). Theodosius is in command of an army including Goths, Huns and Alans. Valentinian II, now 17, is restored as Roman Emperor.
- Frankish invasion of 388: Rebellious Franks led by Marcomer, Sunno and Genobaud invade the Roman Empire with plunder and threaten Colonia Claudia Ara Agrippinensium (Cologne). A part of the invaders are destroyed by the Romans in the charcoal forest (present-day Belgium). The Roman general Quintines pursues the invaders on Frankish soil and is ambushed. His army is surrounded and defeated by the Franks.
- August 28 – Magnus Maximus surrenders at Aquileia, and is executed. Theodosius I devotes himself to gluttony and voluptuous living. Maximus' son Flavius Victor is executed at Trier, by Valentinian's magister militum Arbogast.

==== Persia ====
- King Shapur III dies after a reign in which he has partitioned Armenia with the Roman Empire. He is succeeded by his son Bahram IV, who becomes the twelfth Sassanid king of Persia.

==== India ====
- Emperor Chandragupta II, ruler of the Gupta Empire, begins a war against the Shaka Dynasty in West India.

=== By topic ===
==== Religion ====
- Paternus becomes bishop of the Episcopal see of Braga (Portugal).
- Isaac, age 50, is named Catholicos (spiritual head) of the Armenian Apostolic Church.
- Jerome moves to Palestine, where he spends the rest of his life as a hermit near Bethlehem.
- A group of Christians storms the synagogue of the city Callinicum (Syria), at the Euphrates.

== Births ==
- Elpidius of Atella (or Elpidio), Christian bishop (d. 452)
- Yao Hong, Chinese emperor of the Qiang-led Later Qin state (d. 417)

== Deaths ==
- August 28 – Magnus Maximus, Roman emperor
- Flavius Victor, Roman co-emperor (Augustus)
- Huan Shiqian (or Zhen'e), Chinese general
- Maternus Cynegius, Roman praetorian prefect
- Qifu Guoren, Chinese ruler of the Xianbei-led Western Qin state
- Shapur III, king of the Sassanid Empire (Persia)
- Themistius, Byzantine statesman and rhetorician
- Xie Xuan (or Youdu), Chinese general (b. 343)
