= Argentovaria =

Roman fort in Alsace, France

Coordinates: 48°2′27″N 7°32′36″E

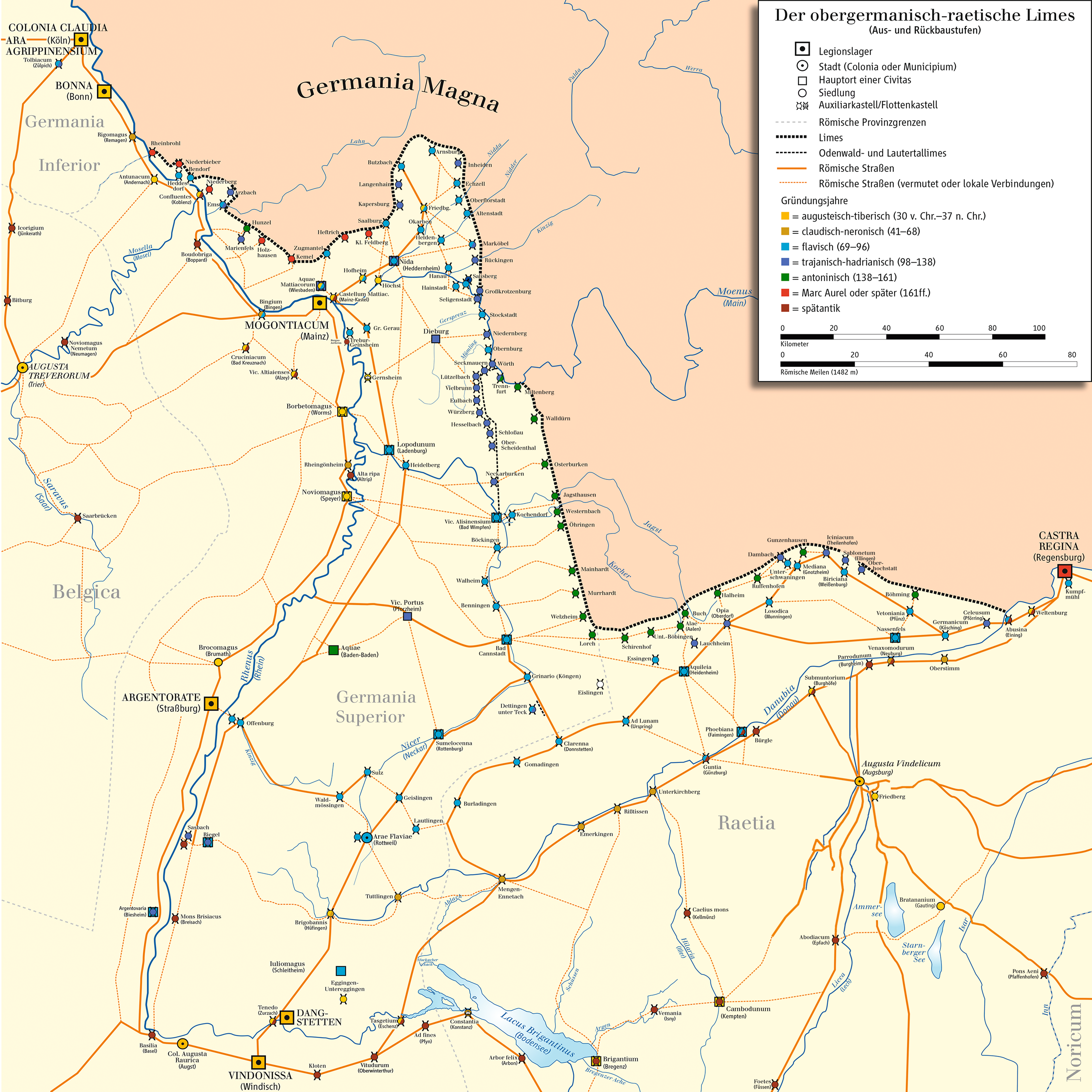
Danube–Iller–Rhine Limes, Argentovaria in lower-left quadrant

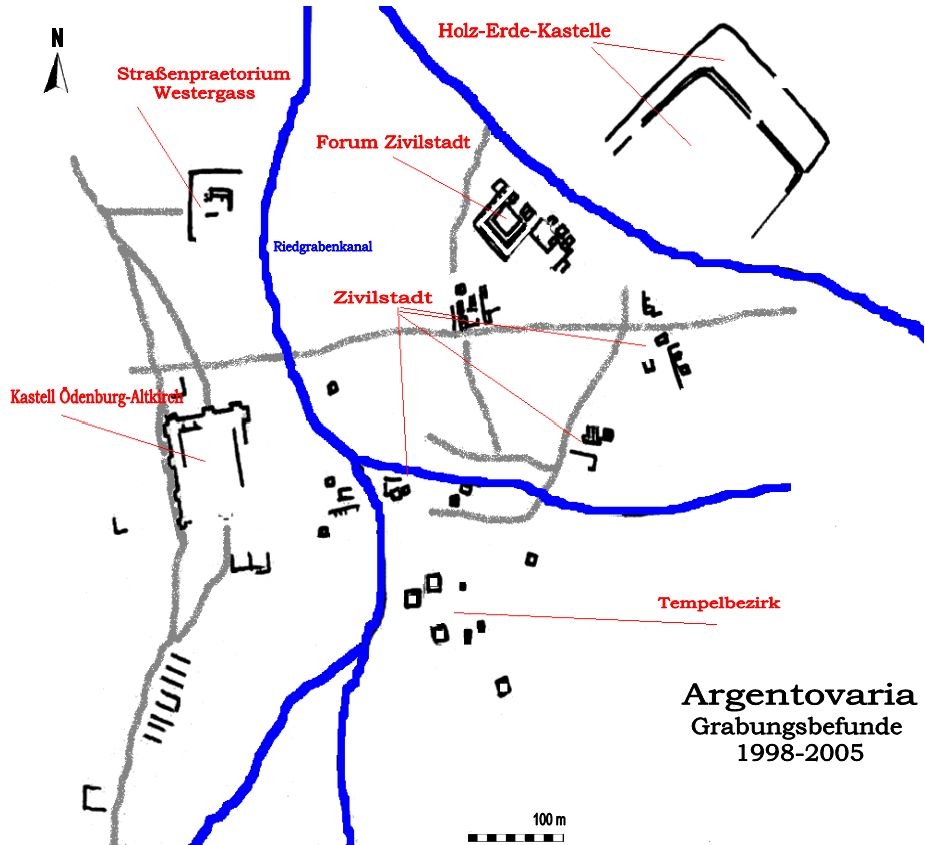
Layout of Argentovaria

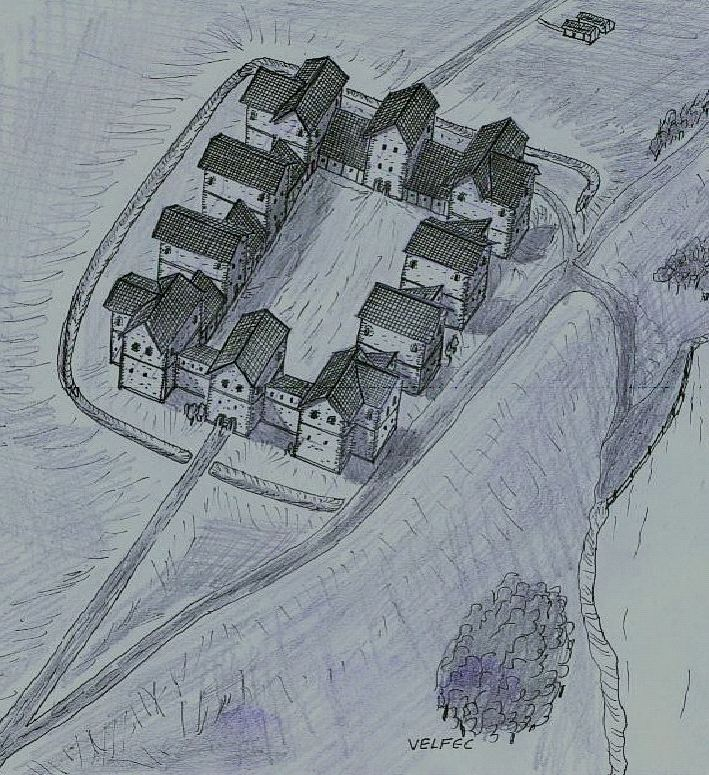
Reconstruction of the fort in the late 4th century

Argentovaria, also known as Ödenburg, is the collective term for a late Roman military installation and a civilian settlement in the area of Biesheim in Alsace, France.

The ancient sites of Biesheim-Kunheim and Ödenburg-Altkirch owe their importance to their position at an important crossing over the Rhine. In the 1st and the 4th centuries AD the area was dominated by the military, but in the 2nd and 3rd centuries AD, the civilian settlement came to the fore. During the great barbarian invasions in the 4th and 5th centuries AD Argentovaria was probably part of a chain of forts that also included the fortifications on the right bank of the Rhine on the Münsterberg in Breisach and on the Sponeck in Sasbach am Kaiserstuhl.

The late Roman castrum was probably one of the numerous border fortresses built under Emperor Valentinian I in the final phase of Roman rule over the Rhine provinces, but only briefly occupied. It was part of the chain of forts of the Danube-Iller-Rhine Limes in the section of the Maxima Sequanorum province. The fort was probably occupied by Roman troops from the 4th to the 5th century AD who were responsible for security and surveillance tasks along the Rhine border.

== Name ==
The ancient name of the civil settlement and the fort are known to us from the second century geographer Claudius Ptolemy and from the Tabula Peutingeriana. Inscriptions supporting this name have not yet been discovered. Around the year 150 Ptolemy referred to the civil settlement of Argentovaria as the "second polis" of the Celtic Rauraci people after Augusta Raurica. The current name "Altkirch" (popularly "Kirchenbuckel") derives from a medieval church which, together with its cemetery has been identified west of the south gate of the fort.

== Location ==
Biesheim is about halfway between Basel and Straßburg, north of Neuf-Brisach and exactly opposite the Kaiserstuhl mountain range. The mountain ranges of the Vosges and the Black Forest, in connection with the strongly meandering Rhine, were considerable obstacles to travel, and to this day only allow east–west passage in a few places. The late antique fort is located on the left bank of the Rhine, a little northwest of the fort at Breisach. The archaeological sites are north of Biesheim. Maps from the 16th and 17th centuries show a place called Edenburg, Oedenburg or Oedenburgheim, which was destroyed in the Thirty Years' War and not rebuilt afterwards. The first wood and earth fort that can be identified here stood on an island on the Rhine, which offered good natural protection. The area of the later fort is currently used intensively for agriculture, and is only recognizable by the relief of the terrain. The fortification was located directly east of the Limes road (via puplica), close to the subsidence of what was then the banks of the Rhine, and was therefore easily accessible by land and also by ship. The findings indicated that as a result, the fort was hit by floods more frequently. Today only the Riedgraben Canal passes here, a sparse remnant of the ancient river bed. The border line between the two Rhine provinces Germania Prima and Maxima Sequanorum ran north of the Kaiserstuhl mountains. Along this line a road from Biesheim-Oedenburg that crossed the Vosges and Divodurum (Metz) and reached the bank of the Rhine. Here it subsequently crossed with the Limes road on the left bank of the Rhine, running from north to south. The fort probably had a strong relationship to this road network.

== Research history ==
Ödenburg is mentioned for the first time by Beatus Rhenanus in 1551 and also appears on Daniel Specklin's map in 1576. Roman finds have been known since around 1770. Originally, Horbourg-Wihr, a district of the municipality of Horbourg near Colmar in the French Département Haut-Rhin, seen as the site of the ancient Argentovaria. However, this assumption had to be revised based on the latest research results. In the late 1970s and early 1980s scientific excavations took place in the southern area of the medieval cemetery for the first time, whereby the area of the late antique fortress was also excavated, although it was not recognized as such. From 1998 to 2002 geophysical soil measurements were carried out as part of the trinational archaeology project “Ödenburg-Altkirch” (Eucor program). After evaluation, targeted excavations by scientists from the University of Freiburg and the University of Basel under the direction and coordination of Hans Ulrich Nuber and of Michel Reddé from the University of Paris became possible. The aim was to further supplement the knowledge about the ancient settlement of the area of Ödenburg-Altkirch, including the military camp, praetorium, civilian town, and Gallo-Roman temple district, from the first to the fourth centuries AD. The excavations were also accompanied by paleobotanical and zoological studies. In the course of these excavations the late Roman fortifications and a group of buildings in the adjacent area “Westergass” were discovered. By 2001, international excavation teams moved almost 1,000 square metres (11,000 sq ft) of earth and uncovered 470 finds, by which the course of the north wall could be precisely determined. From 2003 to 2005 École pratique des hautes études, together with the University of Freiburg and Peter-Andrew Schwarz and Caty Schucany from the University of Basel carried out excavations on the area of the Gallo-Roman temple district in Biesheim-Kunheim. Numerous new insights into ancient cult practices (modus munificendi) were gained. In front of the fort some ancient building remains of the town from the end of the first century AD, which had been destroyed by fire, were uncovered.

== Development ==
The region around Biesheim has been settled since pre-Roman times. Along with Augusta Raurica (Kaiseraugst), Argentovaria was probably one of the largest oppida (caput civitatis) of the Rauraci. To keep the population under control the Romans built a simple wood-earth fortification at this strategically important site. The Roman civilian settlement did not develop around this early fort, but around the temple area from 20 AD.

The wood and earth fort was founded in the 1st century AD, the late antique fort was probably built between 369 and 370 during the reign of Emperor Valentinian I (364–375) in the course of the last expansion and strengthening measures on the Rhine Limes. It belonged to a fortress belt (claustra/clausurae), which consisted of the forts Breisach / Münsterberg (Mons Brisiacum), Sasbach-Jechtingen, and Horbourg and probably also included an Alemannic fortification on the Zähringen castle hill.

The wood-earth forts of the 1st century may have served as a staging area and deployment base for campaigns in the areas on the right bank of the Rhine. The duties of the garrison in Argentovaria were probably to monitor road traffic, control shipping traffic on the river, and watch over the Rhine crossing. Other activities included the observation of the barbarians on the right bank of the Rhine, daily patrols, and the transmission of messages and signals along the Limes.

In the years between 259 and 260, Alemannic tribes finally overran the Upper Germanic-Raetian Limes. Then they occupied the Agri Decumates, which had been under Roman rule for more than 200 years. After the Crisis of the 3rd Century, the Romans were able to stabilize the border along the Rhine, Lake Constance, Iller and Danube lines again. Here, from the late 3rd century, the emperors Diocletian and Maximian built the chain of forts of the so-called Danube-Iller-Rhine Limes. Nevertheless, the Alemanni repeatedly invaded the territory of the Empire, since they often exploited the internal power struggles of the Romans which were usually associated with an almost complete withdrawal of the Limes troops.

In 357 the Battle of Argentoratum took place near what is now Strassburg, in which Emperor Julian the Apostate succeeded in routing the Alemanni and taking their King Chnodomar prisoner. In 378, allegedly 40,000 Alemannic Lentienses broke through the Rhine Limes—either directly at the Sponeck crossing or near Breisach—devastating the border areas and penetrating into the interior of Gaul. To defend his own territory the Western Emperor, Gratian, had to recall a large part of his army from Illyricum, whence it had been dispatched to assist his uncle, the Eastern Emperor, Valens against the Goths and Alans invading Thrace. The invading Alemanni were soon thrown back across the Rhine by Gratian and his Frankish military leaders, the comes Nannienus and the comes domesticorum Mallobaudes after the nearby Battle of Argentovaria, but this victory cost Valens dearly, since Gratian then arrived too late in the Balkans, to save Valens from the catastrophic defeat at the Battle of Adrianople. In August 369 Emperor Valentinian I was staying in the neighboring fort Mons Brisiacum, from where he could, at least temporarily, coordinate and monitor the large-scale construction activities of the Romans on the Rhine Limes. In the course of this, the fortress in Argentovaria was built. Judging by the number of coins, it existed until the withdrawal of the regular border troops under Stilicho between 401 and 406, and possibly even until the middle of the 5th century.

The ruins of the fort were probably still visible above ground until the end of the 17th century. From 1701 on it was removed to extract stone material for the construction of the Neuf-Brisach fortress.

== Fort ==
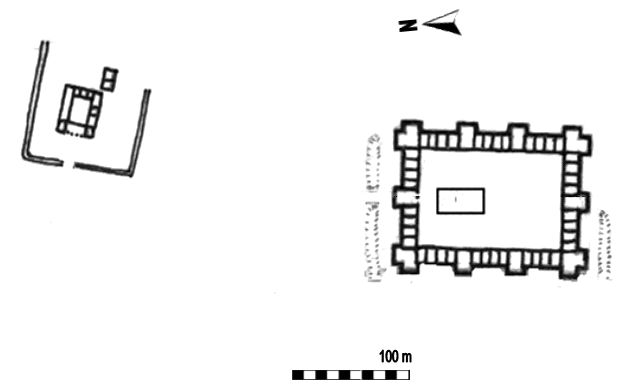
Ground plan of Straßenpraetorium II and the fort

A Roman military base had existed in Biesheim since the 1st century AD. Altogether, two Julio-Claudian wood and earth forts were found for this period, but they were abandoned in the late 1st century. Hans Ulrich Nuber suspects another predecessor from the time of Augustus under the late antique fort.

Oedenburg-Altkirch represents a new type of fort within the comprehensive late antique fortress construction program. The Valentinian castrum measured 93.30 by 126 metres (306.1 ft × 413.4 ft), was precisely aligned with the cardinal points, had a square floor plan, and covered an area of approximately 1.2 hectares (3.0 acres). The building material consisted for the most part of tephrite, a type of volcanic rock found in the area. The Roman unit of measurement used in the construction could be determined on the basis of still intact, mortared brick slabs. It was exactly 66 centimetres (26 in), and thus corresponded to two Gallic pedes Drusani—about 0.3327 metres (13.10 in). The unusual construction of this fort resembles a much smaller 65 by 56 metres (213 ft × 184 ft) facility of the same time period in the Pfalzel district of Trier (Roman Augusta Treverorum), which has been known as the palatiolum since the Middle Ages. There are clear indications that it was furnished with splendid interior decoration, for example mosaics, and thus could have had a primarily ceremonial function. Similar finds are missing for Oedenburg-Altkirch, but it could have been designed by the same architect.

== Defenses ==
The surrounding wall, three meters wide and carefully laid out and mortared, was reinforced with fourteen square bastions, four on each of the long sides and three on the narrow sides. The dimensions of each bastion were almost identical. The masonry was partially preserved up to a height of 1.33 to 1.74 metres (4.4 to 5.7 ft). The foundations sat on rammed wooden piles that reached 0.50 metres (20 in) into the masonry, and were reinforced at the edges with rectangular beams connected by crossbars. The wall was filled with layers of rubble that had been mixed with lime mortar. The partition walls, on the other hand, were also set on a bed of lime mortar reinforced with beams. These foundations were first observed on watchtowers in Switzerland dating back to 371. The southwest corner had been severely disturbed by the intrusion of a bunker of the Maginot Line. The outer façade, presumably originally up to 24 metres (79 ft) high, had an impressive staggered depth due to the tower-like bastions that protruded about five meters and were 14 metres (46 ft) wide. The corner bastions were created by continuing and superimposing the respective lines of the wall. As a result, two square tower bastions, which had been built at an angle of 90 degrees, were the same size as the central ones. The inner chambers had a side length of 7.50 metres (24.6 ft). They led into niche rooms half as large, the entrances of which were vaulted by arches supported on pillars. Together with these the fort encompassed an area of 120 square metres (1,300 sq ft).

To an observer standing in front of the fort, the walls appeared to be considerably higher than they actually were. Bastions and barracks were possibly covered with tiled roofs. The fort was also protected in the north and south by a defensive ditch. The north section was 8.20 metres (26.9 ft) wide and 1.80 metres (5.9 ft) deep, the south section was 6.50 metres (21.3 ft) wide and 2.30 metres (7.5 ft) deep. The northern ditch could be crossed by means of an earth dam, while the southern one ran completely through, and was probably spanned by a bridge. The berm was about 10 metres (33 ft) wide.

== Gates ==
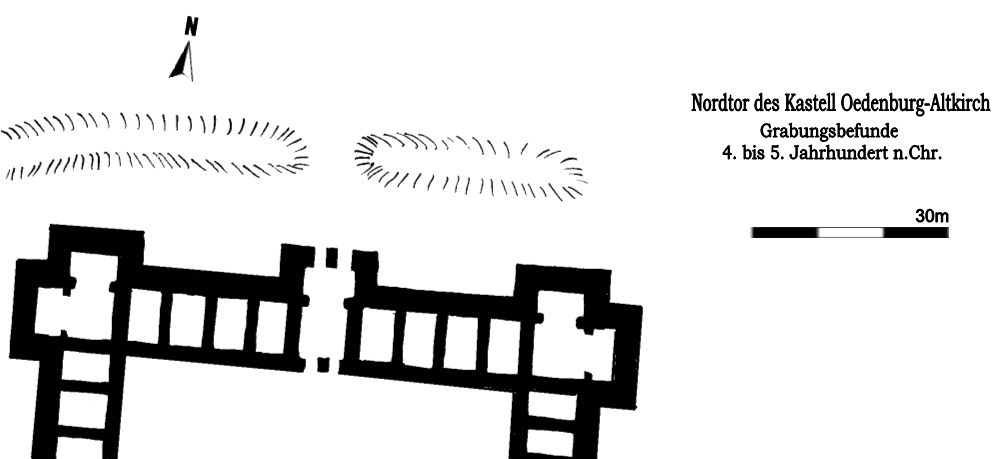
sketch of the plan of the north gate

A total of two gate systems were found. These structures—facing north and south—are so-called chamber gates. They had two passages and were located in the central tower bastions on the narrow sides. When the north gate was excavated in 2000, among other things its width could also be determined to be 14 metres (46 ft). Like the corner bastions, it protruded about 5.08 metres (16.7 ft) from the wall. The passages were three meters wide. The access from the outside—as with other late antique gates—was probably closed by two wooden door leaves and a portcullis. The tower foundation ran through here and was supposed to accommodate the portcullis after it was lowered. The inner chamber was at the exit to the inner courtyard through a central column (spina) divided with a side length of 1.50 metres (4.9 ft), this could also be closed by two wooden gate leaves. The inner chamber of the gate measured 13.14 to 7.98 metres (43.1 to 26.2 ft). The side walls reached a length of 21.31 metres (69.9 ft). The south gate, however, could no longer be measured in its entirety. The passage was designed a little differently, perhaps due to differing measurements. From here you had direct access to the river bank and the Limes road. In 2003 an angular wall was discovered on the east side of the gate, which presumably had a counterpart on the west side, possibly the remains of an interior portico.

== Interior ==
The interior layout consisted of casemate-like, multi-story buildings that ran along the Curtain walls, lined up and divided into ten blocks, each with four 7.5 to 5.5 metres (25 to 18 ft) rooms. Those along the western wall were of different sizes; presumably they served a different purpose. No porticos, which were often observed in comparable forts, could be found in the barracks area. The inner courtyard initially seemed to have been kept free of any development, but in 2002 the remains of a rectangular building, which presumably dates from the 1st century AD, were discovered south of the north gate. After the Roman forces left, some simple Pit-houses and wooden frame structures were built. The medieval churches, of which two apses can still be identified, once stood in the southwest corner.

== Garrison ==
The military unit which occupied Argentovaria in Late Antiquity is unknown. Only the Legio I Martia is documented in the first half of the 4th century as the border protection force responsible for the section on the Upper Rhine. Argentovaria was probably, as usual for the 4th and 5th centuries, occupied by limitanei/ripenses or, more likely during this period, by Germanic Foederati, barbarian allies or mercenaries who were probably part of the army of the Dux Provinciae Sequanicae. One of the most important ancient sources for the disposition of border troops and forts of the 4th and 5th centuries is the Notitia Dignitatum. In it, however, neither the fort name nor the garrison unit or its commanding officer are given. The discovery of a siliqua from the time of Constantius III (408–411), could be a vague indication that it was reoccupied after the devastating invasion of the Vandals and Suebi in 406.

== Town ==
The town had a small-town character and extended over an area of 200 hectares (490 acres). At its peak it probably had around 5,000 inhabitants. The distribution of the buildings was, to a large extent, influenced by the topographical considerations. The Rhine valley at that time was characterized by many smaller watercourses and extensive swampy areas. These often prevented coherent development, which is why the houses almost exclusively had to be built on the slightly higher gravel terraces. Some of these could also be reached only by crossing artificially created channels. The town continued to be inhabited even after the military left, under the Flavian emperors in the late first century.

The core of the settlement was in the area of the late antique fort. The streets were laid out in a grid. The town had a well-developed infrastructure, which included two baths (thermae), a large public building complex—possibly a mansio, a mithraeum, a harbor on the Rhine, and Gallo-Roman temple district. Many of the houses were decorated with frescos, which testifies to a certain degree of wealth of its citizens. The older foundations were made of basalt, the later ones were laid on a layer of river pebbles. Some areas of the town may have been abandoned as early as the 1st century AD, but some new buildings were added to the west of the area in the 2nd and 3rd centuries. No development could be detected in the subsequent period during the Tetrarchy (293–313). In the course of the 5th century, the city was finally destroyed due to the rapidly advancing land seizure by barbarian tribes. Its ruins were almost completely erased by stone robbery in the following centuries, including for the construction of the Vauban Fortress Neuf-Brisach (c.1700).

== Praetorium/mansio and thermae ==
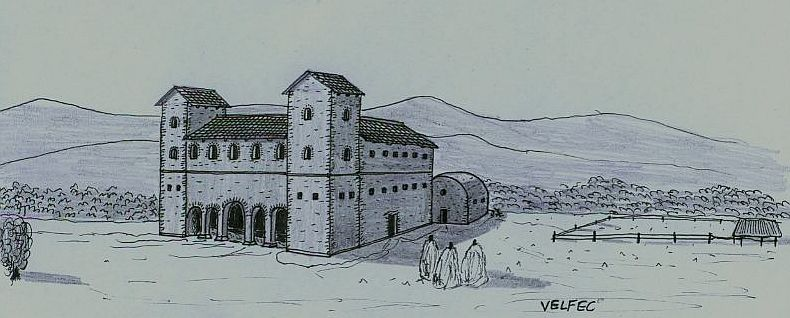
Reconstruction of the praetorium (front) and therme (rear)

The building complex of the late antique praetorium (II) consisted of two buildings—a combined mansio (hostel)/praetorium (headquarters), and thermae (baths)—and was located in the “Westergass” area, 90 metres (300 ft) east of the Limesstrasse. The main building was oriented towards the highway, and was largely surrounded by a v-shaped ditch with a gate passage. It covered an area of 24 by 29 metres (79 ft × 95 ft). The much smaller bath an area of 7 by 14 metres (23 ft × 46 ft). Both were covered with tiled roofs, the roof tiles of which had been supplied by the Legio I Martia from Augusta Raurica. The buildings probably served as a road and rest station for state officials in transit, soldiers, and couriers of the imperial administration. In front of the Praetorium a well shaft was subsequently discovered. The praetorium and baths were probably built during the period between the rule of Constantine I or his sons and Valentinian I (330 to 340). They were in use until the 5th century. Post-roman use is proven by the indications of post holes. which come from half-timbered buildings that replaced the Roman buildings in the early Middle Ages. In their final phase, the buildings are likely to have made a neglected and run-down impression, as the residents and others disposed of their waste immediately in front of the entrances.

== Temple precinct ==
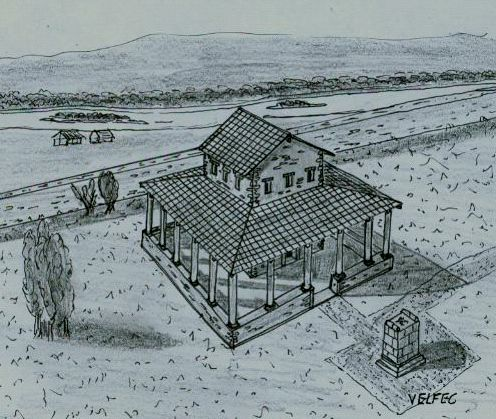
Reconstruction of temple B

The 1.4 hectares (3.5 acres) multi-phase temple precinct in the Biesheim-Kunheim corridor, excavated from 2003 to 2005, consisted of four Gallo-Roman temples with surrounding ambulatories (Buildings A, B, E, C), and ten other cult buildings, all of which were built in the 1st century AD. The precinct covered an area of around 1.6 hectares (4.0 acres), making it one of the largest of its kind in this region. It may have been built over an even older Celtic sanctuary, as the area was surrounded by swamps and an arm of the Rhine in ancient times. The Celts preferred these features when setting up their holy sites, as they needed bogs and lakes to sink their offerings. The first wood and clay buildings date from the years between 70 and 110 AD, they were replaced by stone buildings in the 2nd and early 3rd centuries. One of them was surrounded by a 14 by 14 metres (46 ft × 46 ft) colonnade. Its foundations have only been very poorly preserved through centuries of agricultural activities. The numerous military finds in Temple B show that it was mainly visited by soldiers. This stone temple uncovered by archaeologists from Basel was, according to identification of tile stamps, built by members of Legio VIII Augusta from Argentorate (Strassburg). In addition, there were also numerous altars for sacrifices, for monetary offerings, and a sanctuary of the gods Apollo and Mercury, which were identified by an inscription.

== Mithraeum ==
The Mithraeum, which was examined between 1976 and 1979, stood east of the city and was used to worship the Persian god of light Mithras, whose cult was particularly popular among soldiers. The building had a long rectangular floor plan, was oriented to the north and consisted of two cult rooms and a vestibule (pronaos). The slightly lower interior could be entered via two steps. On both sides of the first room there were brick benches that were used by the believers at the cult meal. In the exedra at the north end of the building there were still some limestone fragments of a relief showing the deity killing a bull (Tauroctony). The Mithraeum in Biesheim probably belongs to the purely civil phase of the settlement after the garrison had withdrawn around 70 AD. According to the coin finds, the sanctuary was destroyed at the end of the 4th century.

== Finds ==
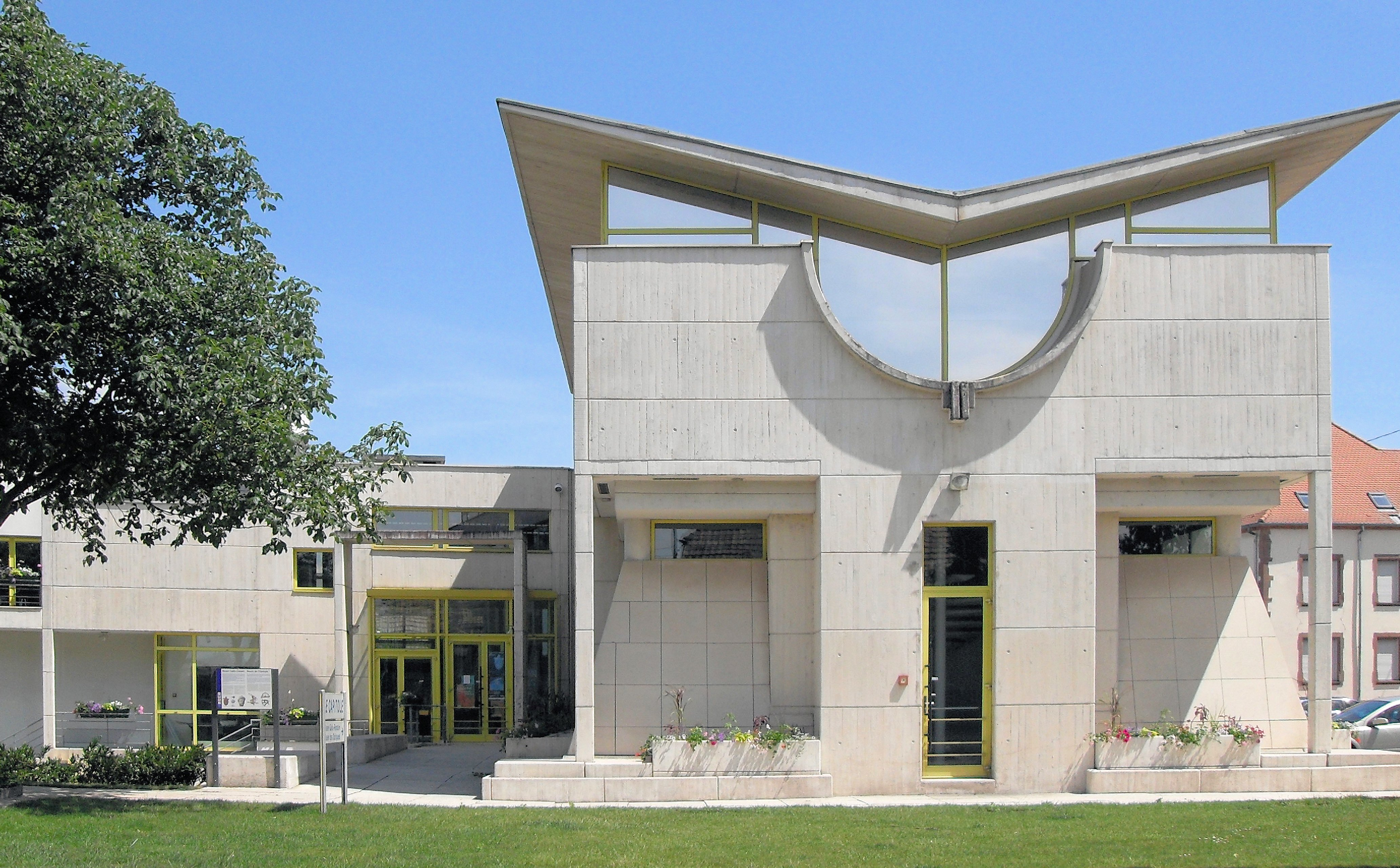
Optical and Gallo-Roman Museum Biesheim

In the southern section of the moat of the fort there were not only late Roman ceramics but also a coin from the time of Valentinian II (378–383 AD). The finds at the Praetorium II consisted mainly of Roman and Germanic clothing decorations that were recovered from several pits.

The finds of oysters and fish from the Mediterranean as well as the remains of a bottle gourd from Africa, which is one of the oldest artifacts of this kind in Europe, speak to the far-reaching trade relations of the inhabitants of Argentovaria. The peppercorns found in the town are also particularly noteworthy.

In the temple area there were mainly coins, fibulae, militaria such as lance ferrules, shield bosses, some cheek flaps from a Weisenau-type helmet. and objects made of lead, which were probably brought here as offerings. Fragments of partly gilded objects, furniture and door fittings, large bronzes, a bronze lamp, fragments of a limestone statue and an inscription by Titus Silius Lucusta, dedicated to Apollo, showed that the temple inventory must have been very elaborately furnished. There were also isolated pits around the temples that still contained fragments of amphorae. They served as places of worship (stipa) for coin offerings. Eggshell fragments suggest that organic offerings were also placed in them. 184 ceramic vessels (jugs, bottles) and objects (e.g. candlesticks, lamps) of various designs were recovered from stone Temple D. For the sacrificial ceremony, they were apparently filled with wine and beer, then placed on a skin-covered elm framework or pyre and then burned.

The finds from the excavations are kept in the Musée Gallo-Romain in Biesheim. Various items of equipment exhibited here attest to the presence of soldiers. Numerous items also provide clues about daily life. A gem set in gold is the most important piece in the collection. The burial customs are presented using reconstructed graves.

== Monument protection ==
The facilities are ground monuments (Bodendenkmäler) within the meaning of the French Monument Protection Act (Code du patrimoine). Archaeological sites—objects, buildings, areas—are defined as cultural treasures (monument historique). Illicit excavations must be reported immediately. Use of metal detectors in protected areas and unreported excavations are prohibited. Attempts to illegally export archaeological finds from France will result in at least two years imprisonment and 450,000 euros, willful destruction and damage to monuments will result in up to three years imprisonment and a fine of up to 45,000 euros. Archaeological finds made by chance are to be handed in immediately to the responsible authorities.
