= Sunno =

Frankish leader in the late 4th century

Sunno was a leader (dux) of the Franks in the late 4th century who invaded the Roman Empire in the year 388 when the usurper and leader of the whole of Roman Gaul, Magnus Maximus was surrounded in Aquileia by Theodosius I.

== History ==
The invasion is documented by Gregory of Tours who cited the now-lost work of Sulpicius Alexander. According to this account, Marcomer, Sunno and Genobaud invaded the Roman provinces Germania Inferior and Belgia. They broke through the limes and killed many people, destroyed the most fruitful lands and made the city of Cologne panic. After this raid the main body of the Franks moved back over the river Rhine with their booty while some remained in the Belgian woods. When the Roman generals Magnus Maximus, Nanninus and Quintinus heard the news in Trier, they attacked those remaining Frankish forces and killed many of their number. After this engagement, Quintinus crossed the Rhine to punish the Franks in their own country, however his army was surrounded and beaten. Some Roman soldiers drowned in the marshes, others were killed by Franks, few made it back to their empire.

Nanninus and Quintinus were replaced by Charietto and Syrus, who were again confronted by an attack of unidentified Franks.

Later after the fall of Magnus Maximus, Marcomer and Sunno held a short meeting about the recent attacks with the Frank Arbogastes, who was a general (magister militum) in the Roman army. The Franks delivered hostages as usual and Arbogastes returned to his winter quarters in Trier.

A couple of years later when Arbogastes had seized power and the West Roman army was nearly completely in the hands of Frankish mercenaries, he crossed the Rhine with a Roman army into Germania because he hated his own kin. Marcomer was seen with Chatti and Ampsivarii but the two did not engage.

Later we hear from the poet Claudian that Marcomer was arrested by Romans and banned to a villa in Tuscany. His brother Sunno crossed the Rhine and tried to set himself up as leader of Marcomer's band, but he was killed by his own people.

According to the later Liber Historiae Francorum, Marcomer tried to unite the Franks after the death of Sunno. He proposed that the Franks should live under one king and proposed his own son Pharamond for the kingship. This source does not tell us if Marcomer succeeded but from other sources it may seem that Pharamond was regarded as the first king of the Francs. However, this account of the Liber Historiae Francorum is not accepted as historical by modern scholars such as Edward James because Marcomer is therein called the son of the Trojan king Priam, and Sunno the son of Antenor, obviously impossible because Priam and Antenor lived hundreds of years earlier.

== Sources ==
- Gregory of Tours, Historiën, Book II - paragraph 9.
- Claudian, Loeb classical Library, On Stilicho's Consulship (translation Platnauer)
- Edward James, De Franken
