= Frankish invasion of 388 =

388–390 invasion of the Roman Empire

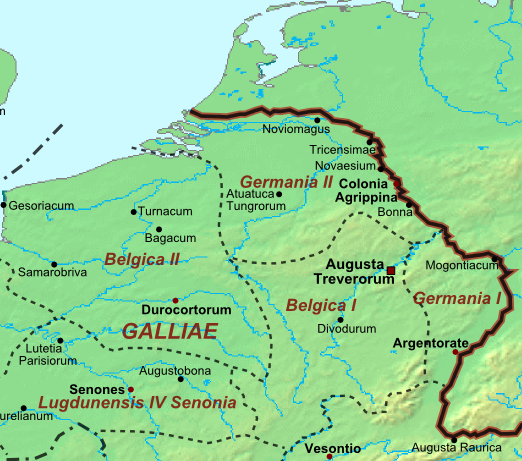
- Northern Gaul
| Date | 388–390 |
| Location | Northern Gaul, Frankish territory east of the Rhine |
| Result | Roman victory |

Belligerents
| Western Roman Empire | Franks |

Commanders and leaders
| Nannienus; Quintinus; Arbogastes | Marcomer; Sunno; Genobaud |

Casualties and losses
| 10,000 | 5,000–15,000 |

The Frankish invasion of 388 was an armed conflict in northern Gaul and in free Germania east of the Rhine. A Frankish raid in 388 led to a short-lived war with the Western Roman Empire. Under the leadership of three rulers, groups of Franks crossed the Rhine border and invaded northern Gaul to plunder. The Roman response was not long in coming and resulted in a punitive expedition that was conducted deep into Frankish soil.

== Sources ==
The Frankish invasion of 388 was handed down by Gregory of Tours, who cited the now lost work of Sulpicius Alexander. According to this account, Marcomer, Sunno and Genobaud invaded the Roman provinces in Gaul. They broke through the limes, killed many people, devastated the most fertile lands, and spread panic in the nearby located Cologne.

== Background ==
The commander of the British troops, Magnus Maximus, who proclaimed himself emperor in 383 and seized control of Gaul with his troops, tried to increase his power in the period 387-388 and thus came into conflict with the Eastern Roman emperor Theodosius I. This conflict, known as the civil war of 387-388, was fought in the Balkans. Emperor Maximus deployed a large part of his army, which led to the Rhine border being minimally taken with troops. This situation made it easy for the Franks to cross the Rhine border to plunder Roman territory on the other side.

== Progress ==
=== Prelude ===
In the spring of 387, Emperor Maximus saw an opportunity to expand his territory by conquering Italy from the 16-year-old Valentinian. He had previously reinforced his army with Frankish and Alemannic mercenaries. It was therefore no secret to the Frankish tribes in free Germania that the Rhine border was undermanned. Civil war between imperial rivals was always the best reason for the communities on the Rhine border to venture on a robber's trail. Taking advantage of Maximus' absence, Frankish war bands crossed the border. Given the surviving reports, they struck and caused much panic with their raids.

=== Invasion ===
After this invasion, the main force of the Franks under Sunno and Marcomer withdrew across the Rhine with their booty. A part of the Franks, probably led by Genobaudes, remained in the Belgian forest known as the "Silva Carbonaria". At that time, the generals Nannienus and Quintinus were staying in Trier, to whom Maximus had entrusted his son and the defense of Gaul. When they heard the news of the Frankish invasion, they attacked the remaining Frankish troops. In the forest in the Ardennes, they intercepted the stragglers and killed many of them.

=== Defeat of Quintinus ===
After the destruction of the Franks in the "Silva Carbonaria", the Roman commanders held a council of war whether they should follow the Franks across the Rhine to punish them in their own country. According to Sulpicius Alexander, Nanninius opposed this because he knew that the Franks would be waiting for them, but the others wanted to punish the Franks on their own soil. As a result, Nanninus withdrew to Mogontiacum (Mainz) while Quintinus led his men to Castellum Novaesium (Neuss) from where they crossed the Rhine.

According to Sulpicius Alexander, Quintines was ambushed on Frankish soil. His army was surrounded and defeated by the Franks. Some Roman soldiers drowned in the marshes, others were killed, only a few managed to return to the Empire.

=== Arbogastes' campaign and aftermath ===
After three battles, Magnus Maximus was defeated by Theodosius I, who thus became sole ruler of the entire empire. Theodosius sent his general Arbogastes to Gaul to restore order. Early in 390, he crossed the Rhine with his army and had his troops burn down the Frankish settlements, called Bructeri in the sources.

Gregory of Tours also notes that Sulpicius Alexander reported that Arbogastes crossed the Rhine again two years later in 392 to return to the areas he had burned two years earlier. He concluded treaties with the same leaders who had invaded the Empire before to obtain auxiliary troops for the Roman army. The Franks and the Alamanni had to renew the old treaties with Rome. Later we learn from the poet Claudian that Marcomer was arrested by the Romans and died in captivity around 397. His brother Sunno crossed the Rhine and tried to set himself up as leader of the Franks, but he was murdered by his own people.

== Primary sources ==
- Sulpicius Alexander
- Gregory of Tours, Historia Francorum
- Claudianus, About the consulate of Stilicho

== Bibliography ==
- Edward James (1988), The Franks, Baarn, pag. 60-61.
- Syvänne, Ilkka (2018). Military History of Late Rome 361–395. Pen and Sword Military. pp. 310–320.
- Wijnendaele, Jeroen W.P. (2024). The wereld van Clovis, de val van Rome en de geboorte van het westen The. pp. 70–71.
