= Genobaud =

Genobaud may refer to:

- Genobaud (3rd century), Frankish petty king
- Genobaud (4th century), Frankish leader
