= Chatti =

Ancient Germanic tribe

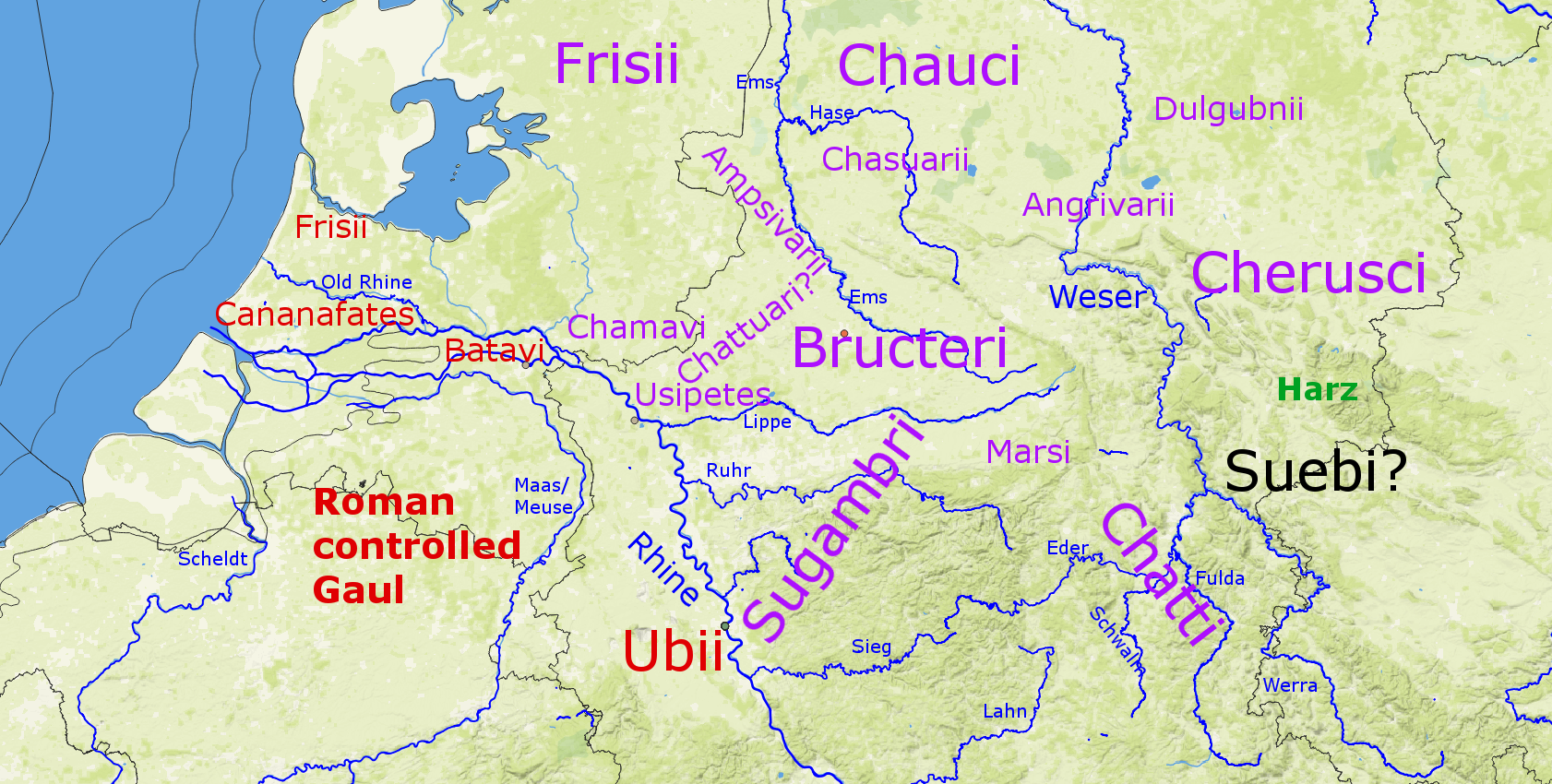
The approximate positions of some Germanic peoples reported by Graeco-Roman authors in 9 BC.

The Chatti were a Roman era Germanic people that lived in a region approximately corresponding to the modern German federal state of Hesse. The Chatti were among the most important opponents of the Roman Empire during the Roman campaigns in Germania which were pursued under the emperor Augustus and his heirs. In this context they were among the defeated opponents of Drusus the Elder, during his Germanic campaigns from 12 BC until his death in 9 BC. Subsequently, they also appear to have been involved in the revolt against Rome which was led by Arminius of the Cherusci, although there is no record of them being present at the Battle of the Teutoburg Forest in 9 AD which initiated these wars. The Chatti and Cherusci nobility were connected by marriage during this period.

Like many of the peoples of their region, archaeological evidence shows that before the Roman invasions the Chatti region shared in the La Tène material culture, similar to the Celtic-speaking Gauls in what is now France. A new regional "Rhine-Weser" material culture developed during the first century AD, which was influenced by both the Romans, and the Elbe Germanic peoples including the Suebi who lived to their east, near the Elbe river. This period of change is believed to have also involved a switch from Celtic to Germanic languages, which also originated near the Elbe. The first surviving Roman reports of the region were made during the Gallic Wars of Julius Caesar in 58-52 BC, do not mention the Chatti, but they do mention the entry of Suebi into the area. He reported them to be mobile and militarized, and creating major disruptions as far away as present day France and Switzerland, even forcing populations to move from their homelands.

Roman sources mentioned that before their entry into the written historical record in about 11 BC the Chatti experienced internal conflicts, which caused groups to leave who went on to found the Rome-allied polities of the Batavi and Cananefates in the Rhine delta. It is speculated that this conflict was influenced by the arrival of both the Romans and the Suebi in their region. The Batavi and Cananefates were known for their soldiers, who became important within the Roman military. It is likely that the Mattiaci, neighbours of the Chatti who, like the Batavi lived under Roman jurisdiction, were also originally a part of the Chatti. Some modern scholars also propose that the name of the Chattuarii, who lived east of the Rhine delta, indicates they lived, or had previously lived, in a land once inhabited by the Chatti, but the Chattuari, like the Suebi, were probably Germanic speakers from the Elbe.

The Chatti are occasionally mentioned in Roman literature in the second century, and during the chaotic third century they apparently continued to exist. Like several of the neighbouring peoples, the Chatti may have eventually become part of the Franks, who were first mentioned in the third century. The Franks, in any case, eventually came to dominate the Chatti homeland.

== Name and language ==
The name of the Chatti was written in many ways by classical authors using Latin or Greek, and there is no clear consensus about what it meant, or which language it originally derived from. The language which the Chatti spoke before the arrival of the Romans and Suebi is unclear. Archaeological evidence shows that the region of Hesse, where they may have already lived before the Romans, that the people there used La Tène material goods, which were also used throughout Gaul, and are strongly associated with Celtic languages. From the second half of the 1st century AD archaeologists classify the Chatti as Rhine-Weser Germanic peoples, implying a connection to Germanic languages.

While linguists typically seek to explain names from this period and region as either Celtic or Germanic, the significant spelling variations in the Chatti name are seen by scholars as showing patterns known from both language families in this period. However, neither of these explain on their own how the name could have evolved to become medieval or modern German "Hesse(n)". It has therefore been argued that the name as it came to Roman era authors was originally Celtic, although most of the Chatti had recently become Germanic speakers when they came into contact with Rome. The name could have evolved further in two different ways, among Celtic and Germanic speakers.

- The first consonantal sound in the name was sometimes given in Latin as a simple "c" implying a "k" sound, while the "ch" (or Greek "χ") is interpreted as representing a fricative sound. This is pattern of variation which could match a Germanic language, as these underwent Grimm's Law whereby k sounds became fricative, eventually becoming h sounds. Germanic speakers also sometimes appear to have applied this soundchange to Celtic loanwords, for example in the case of the Celtic Volcae, whose name became Walha in Germanic.
- The second consonantal sound was also rendered in several ways. According to Rübekeil the spelling "-tth-" clearly predominates over "-tt-". This may represent a θ-sound as in English "th", or an affricate "ts". This pattern of variation matches the so-called Tau gallicum in Gaulish, the Celtic language of Gaul, where some t sounds finally became s sounds. Many Celtic or Gaulish peoples of this time had names ending in -casses/-cassi, such as the Bodiocasses, Durocasses, Veliocasses, Viducasses, Sucasses, Tricasses. It was proposed already by Karl Müllenhoff, and later discussed by Helmut Birkhan, that the Chatti might have originally belonged to this group.

In the 21st century, the broader proposal that the Chatti were Germanised Celts has been the subject of more detailed proposals by Wagner and Toorians to explain how the medieval and modern name of Hesse apparently evolved from an originally Celtic name of the Chatti. Toorians derives it from Proto-Celtic *kassis from earlier *katsi-, meaning "hate". Wagner derives it instead from an adjective *cad-ti- coming from *katus, meaning "battle".

However, many other proposals including derivations from Germanic also exist, beginning with Jakob Grimm who proposed that the name is related to English "hat".

== Relationships to other Germanic peoples ==
According to Tacitus, writing in about 100 AD, the Batavi were originally been a part of the Chatti. Domestic strife (seditione domestica) forced the Batavi to move away from the other Chatti and settle in the Rhine delta as special military allies of Rome, before their first clear appearance of the Chatti or Batavi in Roman records. Tacitus also described the Canninefates, who lived in the delta, sharing the same large island with the Batavi, as being the same as the Batavi in origin, language, and valour, but smaller in numbers.

The Chattuarii were not connected to the Chatti by any classical authors but modern scholars note that their name transparently means something like "Chatti dwellers". The second element in the name is common among Germanic peoples, especially in this region, such as Chasuarii "dwellers on the river Hase", Ampsivarii "dwellers on the river Ems", and the Angrivarii. Scholars generally believe the name of the Chattuari can be interpreted as "inhabitants of the Chatti-lands", in parallel with the post-Roman names of the "Baiuvarii", which is typically interpreted as a name indicating that this people had once been inhabitants of the old homeland of the Boii, and the Boructuarii, who are believed to have been living where the Bructeri once lived. The Chattuarii lived to the east of the Rhine delta, outside the Roman empire, but close to the Batavi and Canninefates. Wagner and Rübekeil note that this name has a Germanic ending, and is always spelled with "-tt-", not "-tth-", unlike the name of the Chatti. They therefore propose that these were Germanic speaking newcomers to the region, probably Suebi, and without the same Celtic heritage. Petrikovits sees this name as evidence that Chatti had originally lived in this more northerly region, east of the Rhine delta. He noted how Dio Cassius described how the Chatti, like their offshoots the Batavi, Cananefates and Mattiaci, were assigned land by the Romans shortly before they first appear in the historical records.

Tacitus did not explicitly describe the Mattiaci as an offshoot of the Chatti, but he emphasized their similarity with the Batavi not only in terms of their special military alliance with Rome, but also in other ways (cetera similes Batavi). Modern scholars also note that their name shows an obvious connection to the Chatti stronghold called Mattium. The Mattiaci were furthermore neighbours of the Chatti, but closer to the Rhine. Petrikovits suggested for example that they represent a branch of the Chatti who decided to remain in the lands near the Rhine which the Romans had assigned to them in the time of Augustus.

== Location ==
The accounts of Julius Caesar's Gallic wars in 58-52 BC discussed the region in some detail, but never directly mention the Chatti, Batavi, Canninefates, Mattiaci or Chattuarii. On the eastern side of the Rhine lived the Sugambri to the north and the Ubii to the south. However, he reported that to their east, near the north of what is now Hesse, the Germanic Suebi had established themselves. These were a mobile and militarized people, threatening the area from a position east of the Ubii. A further indication of their position is given by his description of the Tencteri and Usipetes as two Germanic peoples who had been forced to leave their homeland under pressure from the Suebi. Their homeland was apparently east of the Rhine delta, in the vicinity of the Sugambri, with whom they were able to seek refuge when attacked by Caesar. East of the Suebi was a dense forest, the Silva Bacenis (possibly the Harz), and then the Cherusci.

During the time of the Germanic wars of Augustus, when the Chatti began to appear in the historical record, the core of the Chatti lands is believed to have lain in the low basin stretching through the centre of Hesse. The Sugambri still lived between the Chatti and the Rhine, and their area of control now stretched further south, encompassing the region which the Rome-allied Ubii had left vacant after moving, like the Batavi and Canninefates, to the western side of the Rhine, under Roman control.

Cassius Dio, writing centuries later, but using sources now lost, mentioned that the Romans also assigned land to the Chatti near the Rhine. The Sugambri, being hostile to Rome, attacked the Chatti in 11 or 10 BC. While they were distracted in this war the Roman prince Drusus the Elder attacked the Sugambri, and then built forts confronting them, including a fort in Chattian territory. After these events the Chatti abandoned the land which the Romans had given, and joined the Sugambri, becoming enemies of Rome. This abandoned area which the Romans initially allocated to the Chatti may have previously belonged to the Ubii, whose lands were otherwise taken over by the Sugambri in this period. Alternatively, Petrikovits has suggested that this area near the Rhine represented the country of the Mattiaci, who he sees as a part of the Chatti who decided to remain allies of Rome.

The Sugambri and the Suebi were defeated by the Drusus in 9 BC, and ceased to exist in this region. Many were subsequently moved west of the Rhine, and many Suebi apparently joined the Marcomanni in their move to Bohemia.

At the end of the 1st century AD, Tacitus described the situation which had developed in the preceding generations of Roman hegemony:

- To their west, the Sugambri state near the Rhine had been destroyed by the Romans, and Tacitus reported that the Tencteri and Usipetes had now moved into the area between the Rhine and the Chatti. The Bructeri lands which lay north of the old Sugambri lands (and now north of the Tencteri) were according to Tacitus currently under the occupation of the Chamavi and Angrivarii.
- To the south of the Chatti was part of the Hercynian Forest, which separated the Chatti from the area east of the Rhine and north of the Danube, which was now within Roman frontiers and protected by Roman military positions. There were Chatti living within habitable parts of this hilly forest.
- To the north of the Chatti, Tacitus claimed that they bordered upon a part of the Chauci, who were very powerful in his time. Modern scholars are sceptical of this claim.
- To the northeast, the neighbours of the Chatti and Chauci were the Cherusci and Fosi, who had become much weaker than they had once been.

Roman sources identify the approximate position of the Chatti capital of Mattium by mentioning that it was necessarily to cross to the northern side of the Eder river to reach it. Destroyed by Germanicus, its location is not known today, but generally it is assumed to be in the wider neighbourhood of Fritzlar.

== History ==
The first clearly recorded event involving the Chatti was the Sugambri attack upon the Chatti in 11 or 10 BC, during the time of Drusus the Elder. They were angry at the Chatti for not joining their anti-Roman alliance. The Chatti were at that time allied to Rome, and holding land near the Rhine which had been assigned to them by Rome. Both the Sugambri and the Chatti were therefore occupying lands which had once been Ubian, before the Ubii moved west of the Rhine, within the empire. After Drusus built a fort in their territory, the Chatti abandoned that region and joined the Sugambri.

Drusus defeated the Chatti again in one or more campaigns in 10-9 BC. From the several sources which report the sequence of battles, it seems that he had first defeated the Usipetes, before overrunning the territory of the Tencteri and Chatti, who were apparently allies, and already neighbours. In 9 BC, in this same campaign Drusus also defeated the Marcomanni, and an alliance of the Sugambri, Cherusci and Suevi. These victories led to the disappearance of the Marcomanni, Sugambri, and Suebi from the region of the Chatti, while the Tencteri, Usipetes and Cherusci remained, though now pacified, and under Roman hegemony.

Velleius Paterculus mentioned the Chatti in 6 AD, involving a planned invasion of the Marcomanni and other Suebi who had settled deep within the Hercynian forest in what is now the Czech Republic: "Sentius Saturninus received the order to march with his legions through the area of the Chatti to Boiohaemum, which is the name of the area occupied by Maroboduus, cutting a passage through the Hercynian forest which bounded the region." The attack never happened, but the record gives an indication of how far south the Chatti lived, as this Roman campaign was probably intended to depart from Roman Mainz and travel via their base in Marktbreit.

In 9 AD the Chatti are believed to have joined the Cherusci rebellion against Rome, which began when Arminius annihilated the forces of Varus in the Battle of the Teutoburg Forest. There is no record connecting to the battle itself, but the Chatti involved in the subsequent battles against Germanicus and others, and 40 years later they were still holding slaves captured at the battle:

- In the spring of 15 AD Aulus Caecina Severus raided the Chatti beginning at the Taunus where there were Roman fortifications, captured and slaughtered the old and weak, ravished the countryside, and crossed the Eder to burn down the capital at Mattium. When returning towards the Rhine they defeated Marsi forces, and frightened off Cherusci, who had come to help the Chatti.
- In 16 AD the legate Gaius Silius twice invaded Chattian territory. He captured the wife and daughter of a Chattian noble named Arpus.
- In 17 AD Germanicus celebrated his triumph over "the Cherusci, Chatti, and Angrivarii, and the other tribes which extend as far as the Elbe". Along with the Cherusci captives paraded at his triumph were Ramis the wife of Sesithacus, who was the son of Segimer, chieftain of the Cherusci, and a daughter of Ucromerus, a Chattian noble. There was also a Chattian priest named Libes. (Tacitus informs that the mother of Flavus, the brother of Arminius, was a daughter of Actomerus, a prince of the Chatti.)
- In AD 19, a Chattian noble named Adgandestrius proposed to the Roman Senate that he could have Arminius murdered if they sent poison, but the Senate rejected this proposal.
- At the end of AD 39 or 40 the Chatti seem to have carried out a raid into the area of the upper Rhine army. Sulpicius Galba, conducted a retaliatory strike against them in AD 40 or 41.
- In 50 AD, a major raid by the Chatti into Germania Superior was defeated decisively by the legions led by Publius Pomponius Secundus. In this victory the Romans were able to release Romans who had been captured at the Varus disaster in the Teutoburg Forest and been slaves for 40 years.

In 58 AD the Chatti were defeated by the Hermunduri in a dispute over a religiously significant river, which had saline springs and which defined a boundary between the two peoples. "The war was a success for the Hermunduri, and the more disastrous to the Chatti because they had devoted, in the event of victory, the enemy's army to Mars and Mercury, a vow which consigns horses, men, everything indeed on the vanquished side to destruction."

During 69 AD, the Year of the Four Emperors, and the Revolt of the Batavi, which was initiated by Germanic and Gaulish peoples inside the empire, the Chatti, Usipetes and Mattiaci attempted to take advantage of the situation and besieged Mainz. Gaius Dillius Vocula relieved the city with three legions.

The Chatti were opponents of the emperor Domitian, who celebrated a triumph over them in late 83 or early 84, although fighting continued until 85. They were allies of Lucius Antonius Saturninus the governor of Germania Superior in his revolt of 89 AD, but drifting ice on the Rhine prevented them, and they were subsequently attacked by the loyal governor of Germania Inferior.

When the Cherusci elected Chariomerus, a king who was friendly to Domitian, the Chatti supported his overthrow.

The Chatti appear again during the build up to the Marcomannic Wars, attacking southwards towards Germania superior and Raetia in what is now southern Germany, in 162. They were defeated by the governor of Germania Superior. A few years later, during the Marcomannic Wars themselves, the Chatti were repulsed together with the Hermunduri from the Rhine by Didius Julianus in 175.

== Later history and mentions ==
In the third century, the empire went through a major crisis — the so called crisis of the third century — and had weak control of its frontiers for long periods. Barbarian raids were frequent, but the identities of the raiders are not always clear. New names such as the Franks and Alemanni also eventually began to appear, which apparently included peoples with their own older names.

In an entry concerning 213 AD, Dio Cassius was possibly the first author to mention the Alamanni. In the same unclear passage, the Chatti also appear to be mentioned. Writing about the Germanic war of Caracalla, he described the emperor fighting "Κέννους, Kελτικòν ἔθνος" ("the Kenni, a Celtic people"). (Dio Cassius normally called Germani a type of Celt.) This is taken from an excerpt of Dio in the writings of Joannes Xiphilinus. However, a parallel fragment from the continuation of this passage in Fragmenta Valesiana seems to refer to the same people as "Chattoi".

Xiphilinus fragment:	Valesiana/Pieresc fragment:
The women of these people, after being captured by the Romans	The women of the Chatti and of the Lambanni (sic)—at least those who were taken—did not endure anything servile.
τούτων γυναῖκες ἁλοῦσαι ὑπὸ τῶν Ῥωμαίων,	Ὅτι τῶν Χάττων αἱ γυναῖχες χαὶ τῶν λαμβαννῶν οὐ μὴν ὅσαι γε χαὶ ἑάλωσαν δουλοπρεπές τε ὑπέμειναν,
—when Antoninus asked whether they wished to be sold or to be killed, they chose the latter	—but when Antoninus inquired whether they wished to be sold or to be killed, they chose the latter
ἐρωτήσαντος αὐτὰς τοῦ ᾿Αντωνίνου πότερον πραθῆναι ἢ φονευθῆναι βούλονται, τοῦθ᾽ εἵλοντο	ἀλλὰ πυθομένου τοῦ ᾿Αντωνίνου πότερόν ποτε πραθῆναι ἢ φονευθῆναι βούλονται, τοῦθ᾽ εἵλοντο
then, after being sold off, they all killed themselves, and there are some who even killed their children.	then, after being sold off, they all killed themselves; there are some who even killed their children.
ἔπειτ᾽ ἀπεμποληθεῖσαι πᾶσαι μὲν ἑαυτάς, εἰσὶ δ᾽ αἷ καὶ τὰ τεκνα ἀπέκτειναν.	ἔπειτα ἀπεμτιοληθεῖσαι πᾶσαι μὲν αὐταὶ ἑαυτάς, εἰσὶ δ᾽ αἷ χαὶ τὰ παιδία ἀπέχτειναν.
Notes: Caracalla's real name was Antoninus. Dio Cassius mainly spells the name of the Alemanni in this passage as "Alambanni".

The "Cati" are mentioned between the Bructeri and Burgundians in the Laterculus Veronensis which was made in about 314 AD, in a list of people who had been under imperial domination in the third century. This matches their traditional position, and argues for their continued existence.

In 392/3 AD, during the winter campaign of Arbogast against the Franks east of the Rhine, he observed Chatti and Ampsivarii forces on heights at some distance from the Roman force. They were under the leadership of the Frankish dux, Marcomer. It has been suggested by some scholars that this must be an error for the Chattuari. However, not all scholars agree. This quotation is one of the only pieces of evidence that the Chatti may have become Franks.

== Classical ethnography and literature ==
Pliny the Elder, in his Natural History (written 77–79 AD) distinguished the Chatti and Suebi but grouped them together with the Hermunduri and the Cherusci, calling this group the Hermiones, which is a nation of Germanic tribes also mentioned by Tacitus as living in inland Germany.

Strabo, some time after 16 AD, included the Chatti in a listing of conquered Germanic tribes who were more settled and agricultural, but also poorer, than the nomadic tribes such as the Suebi. They were poor because they had fought the Romans, and had been defeated and plundered.

In his second book of Epigrams, Martial credited the emperor Domitian (51–96 AD) as having overcome the Chatti:

"frater Idumaeos meruit cum patre triumphos,
quae datur ex Chattis laurea, tota tua est.

"Your brother earned Idumaean triumphs together with your father,
but the laurel given for the Chatti is totally yours."

Tacitus described the Chatti around 100 AD. He contrasted the Chatti of his time with their neighbours the Cherusci, who were once powerful but had unwisely pursued a policy of "excessive and languishing peace" (nimiam ac marcentem diu pacem). According to him, this was inappropriate in a region where matters are decided by force, and only the strongest can be moderate and righteous. Observers once saw the Cherusci as good and fair, but now called them idle and foolish. In contrast, when the more warlike Chatti have good luck, they are seen as wise.

Notably, Tacitus described the Chatti as having no cavalry, despite the famous reputation of their supposed kinsmen the Batavi and Cannanefates, or their western neighbours the Tencteri and Ubii:

Hardy frames, close-knit limbs, fierce countenances, and a peculiarly vigorous courage, mark the tribe. For Germans, they have much intelligence and sagacity; they promote their picked men to power, and obey those whom they promote; they keep their ranks, note their opportunities, check their impulses, portion out the day, intrench themselves by night, regard fortune as a doubtful, valour as an unfailing, resource; and what is most unusual, and only given to systematic discipline, they rely more on the general than on the army. Their whole strength is in their infantry, which, in addition to its arms, is laden with iron tools and provisions. Other tribes you see going to battle, the Chatti to a campaign. Seldom do they engage in mere raids and casual encounters. It is indeed the peculiarity of a cavalry force quickly to win and as quickly to yield a victory. Fleetness and timidity go together; deliberateness is more akin to steady courage.

Tacitus also notes that like other Germanic tribes such as the Suebi, the Chatti took an interest in traditions concerning haircuts and beards.

A practice, rare among the other German tribes, and simply characteristic of individual prowess, has become general among the Chatti, of letting the hair and beard grow as soon as they have attained manhood, and not till they have slain a foe laying aside that peculiar aspect which devotes and pledges them to valour. Over the spoiled and bleeding enemy they show their faces once more; then, and not till then, proclaiming that they have discharged the obligations of their birth, and proved themselves worthy of their country and of their parents. The coward and the unwarlike remain unshorn. The bravest of them also wear an iron ring (which otherwise is a mark of disgrace among the people) until they have released themselves by the slaughter of a foe. Most of the Chatti delight in these fashions. Even hoary-headed men are distinguished by them, and are thus conspicuous alike to enemies and to fellow-countrymen. To begin the battle always rests with them; they form the first line, an unusual spectacle. Nor even in peace do they assume a more civilised aspect. They have no home or land or occupation; they are supported by whomsoever they visit, as lavish of the property of others as they are regardless of their own, till at length the feebleness of age makes them unequal to so stern a valour.

A Chattian appears among ethnic stereotypes in a panegyric written in honour of the emperor Avitus by Sidonius Apollinaris in the late fifth century: "the Alaman sent envoys to crave pardon for their frenzy, the Saxon's raiding abated and the marshy water of Elbe confined the Chattian".

== 19th Century usage ==
At the Congress of Vienna the Elector of Hesse, restored with the fall of Napoleon, unsuccessfully attempted to get recognized as "King of the Chatti" - though by then the Chatti had long since ceased to exist as a distinct ethnic group

== Places named after the Chatti ==
Apart from the modern regional name Hesse or Hessen, other placenames have been associated with the Chatti.

- Kassel: possibly derived from the ancient Castellum Cattorum, a castle of the Chatti
- Hattem: possibly derived from Hatto-Heim (hamlet of the Chatti).
- Katwijk: possibly from Chatti and vicus, "hamlet, village, neighborhood"
- Katzenelnbogen: historians have speculated that the name derives from *Cattimelibocus, a combination of two words: the Chatti and Melibokus, from Μηλίβοκον (Mēlíbokon), the name of a mountain range in Ptolemy's Geography which has been (probably incorrectly) identified with the Malchen.
- Mont des Cats

== In popular culture ==
- The Light Bearer (1994), a historical novel by Donna Gillespie.
- Mark of the Lion Series (1993), a series of historical fiction novels by Francine Rivers.
- Barbarians (2020), one of the tribes that unites against the Romans prior to the Battle of the Teutoburg Forest.

== See also ==
- In geology, the Chattian Age of the Oligocene Epoch is named after the Chatti
- Woman of the Chatti

== Bibliography ==
- Becker, Armin (2001), "Mattium", in Beck, Heinrich; Geuenich, Dieter; Steuer, Heiko (eds.), Reallexikon der Germanischen Altertumskunde, vol. 19 (2 ed.), De Gruyter, pp. 443–444, ISBN 978-3-11-017163-1
- Jungandreas, Wolfgang (1981), "Chatten I. Philologisches § 2. Sprachliches", in Beck, Heinrich; Geuenich, Dieter; Steuer, Heiko (eds.), Reallexikon der Germanischen Altertumskunde, vol. 4 (2 ed.), De Gruyter, pp. 378–392, ISBN 978-3-11-006513-8
- Lanting, J.N.; van der Plicht, J. (2010), "De ^{14}C-chronologie van de Nederlandse Pre- en Protohistorie VI: Romeinse tijd en Merovingische periode, deel A: historische bronnen en chronologische schema's", Palaeohistoria, vol. 51/52, p. 62, ISBN 978-90-77922-73-6
- Neumann, Günter (1981a), "Chatten I. Philologisches § 1. Name", in Beck, Heinrich; Geuenich, Dieter; Steuer, Heiko (eds.), Reallexikon der Germanischen Altertumskunde, vol. 4 (2 ed.), De Gruyter (published 1981), pp. 377–378, ISBN 978-3-11-006513-8
- Neumann, Günter (1981b), "Chattwarier § 1. Der Name", in Beck, Heinrich; Geuenich, Dieter; Steuer, Heiko (eds.), Reallexikon der Germanischen Altertumskunde, vol. 4 (2 ed.), De Gruyter (published 1981), pp. 391–392, ISBN 978-3-11-006513-8
- Liccardo, Salvatore (2023), Old Names, New Peoples: Listing Ethnonyms in Late Antiquity, Brill, doi:10.1163/9789004686601, ISBN 978-90-04-68660-1
- Petrikovits, Harald (1981), "Chatten II. Historisches", in Beck, Heinrich; Geuenich, Dieter; Steuer, Heiko (eds.), Reallexikon der Germanischen Altertumskunde, vol. 4 (2 ed.), De Gruyter, pp. 379–386, ISBN 978-3-11-006513-8
- Rübekeil, Ludwig (2002), "Canninefates. Nomen und Gens in der keltisch-germanischen Kontaktzone", Actas do XX congreso internacional de ciencias onomásticas, Santiago 1999, pp. 1237–1247
- Toorians, Lauran (2006), "Betuwe en Hessen, Bataven en Chatten", Naamkunde (36 (2005-2006)): 179–190
- Wagner, Norbert (2011), "Lat.-germ. Chatti und ahd. Hessi 'Hessen'", Historische Sprachforschung / Historical Linguistics, 124: 277–280, doi:10.13109/hisp.2011.124.1.277, JSTOR 41553577
