= Ampsivarii =

Ancient Germanic tribe

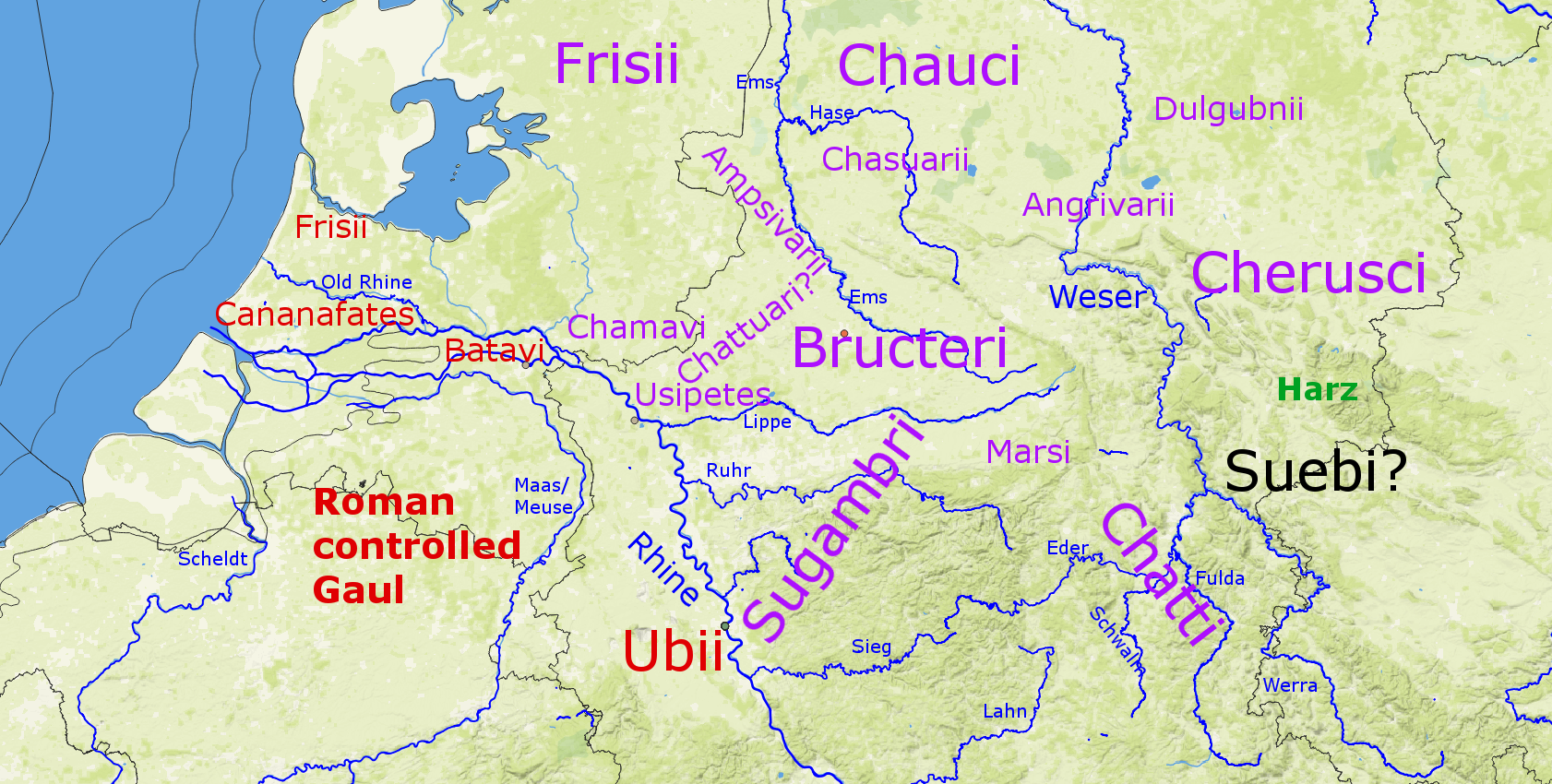
The approximate positions of some Germanic peoples reported by Graeco-Roman authors in the first century.

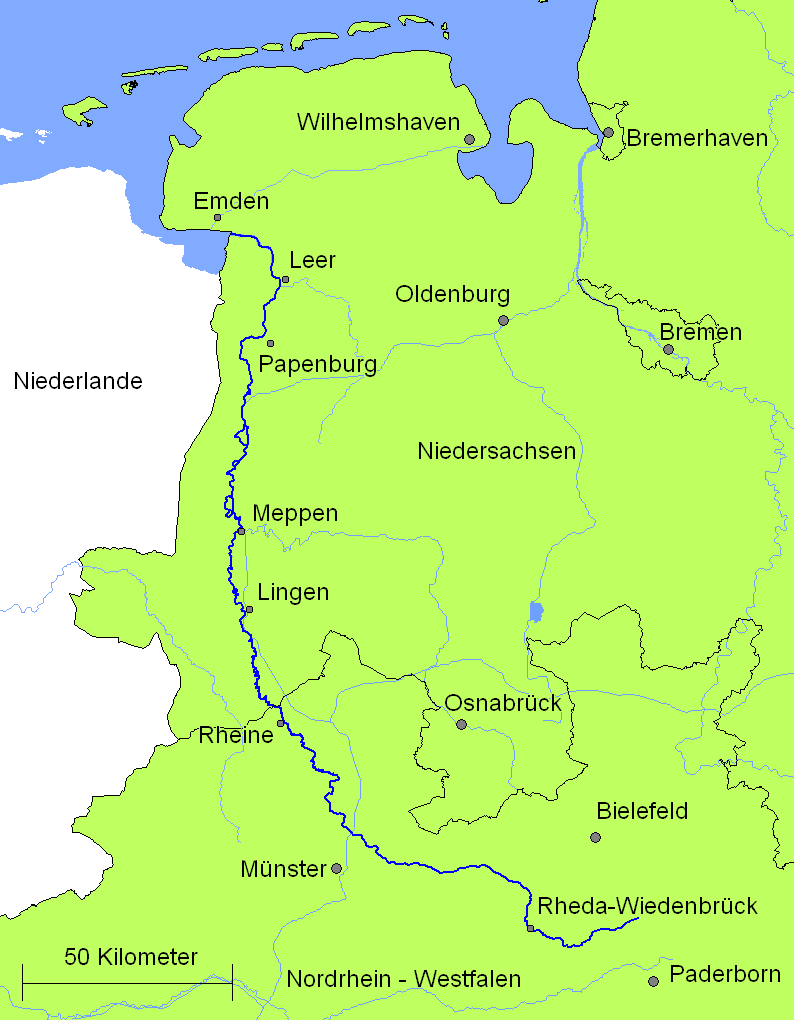
Lower Ems

The Ampsivarii or Amsivari , were a Germanic people during the time of the Roman Empire. Their homeland was originally near the river Ems, which now flows into the North Sea near the Dutch-German border. It is supposed that the first part of their name also refers to the river Ems, which in Roman texts was called the Amisia.

All or many of the Ampsivarii were forced from their original homeland in the first century, but at least some of them apparently found a new homeland further south.

In the 4th century, the Ampsivarii were one of the Germanic peoples who came to be referred to as Franks.

== Tacitus ==
Tacitus, in his Annals wrote an extended digression about events affecting the Ampsivarii in the first century AD, under a leader named Boiocalus. He indicates that during the reign of Nero (54-68 AD), and after 58 AD, the Ampsivarii were a "stronger people" (validior gens) in terms of numbers than the Frisii who lived north of the Rhine delta. Their leader Boiocalus was also a celebrated (clarus) person among the peoples of the region. However, by the time of Tacitus, writing in about 100 AD, they had been forced to move from their homeland. The men of fighting age had been killed, and the others had been sold to slavery. Scholars however believe that Tacitus exaggerated the destruction of the Ampsivarii, because they appear in later records.

In the account of Tacitus, Boiocalus, speaking in the period 58-68 AD, reminded the Romans that the Ampsivarii had refused to support Arminius in the "Cheruscan rebellion" (rebellione Cherusca) which lead to the Battle of the Teutoburg Forest in 9 AD. And during the rebellion he had been thrown into chains by order of Arminius. The Ampsivarii had probably made a formal treaty with the Romans. Modern scholars have made different proposals about when this might have occurred. For example, Wenskus thought it might have already been during the campaigns of Drusus the Elder in 12 BC, while Lanting and van der Plicht think it likely happened during the campaigns of Tiberius in 4-5 AD. Tacitus has Boiocalus report that in the time of Nero his people had been obedient to the Romans for 50 years, and that he had personally served under both Tiberius and his nephew Germanicus.

After the rebellion the Chauci had at some point before the reported speech of Boiocalus attacked the Ampsivarii and driven them from their homeland. The Ampsivarii were now asking the Romans for permission to settle on meadow lands on the northern bank of the Rhine military border, which the Romans had reserved for their own soldiers to run cattle, but was not yet in use.<name=tac55/> In 58 AD, the Frisii, another people allied to the Romans, had already recently begun to farm there, but been expelled by force. Before the Frisii, and before the Romans reserved it, Boiocalus claimed that the fields had been held by the Chamavi, then by the Tubantes, and later by the Usipi. These fields were probably located somewhere between Arnhem, which was on the old course of the Rhine, and Wesel, where the River Lippe enters the Rhine.

The Romans, although moved, refused the request, although they offered Boiocalus a grant of land which he rejected. The Ampsivarii became refugees, hosted by various tribes in the west of the Rhine in what is now Germany. They first formed a defensive alliance with the Tencteri and Bructeri, and other tribes who lived further away from the Romans and the Rhine. The Romans entered the lands of the Tencteri and threatened to annihilate them. Because of these threats both allies withdrew their support. They then entered the lands of the Usipi and Tubantes, but they were also expelled from there. They then sought refuge as destitute men among the Chatti but then had to move on to the Cherusci who treated them as enemies. According to Tacitus those of military age were killed, while those incapable of fighting were divided up as booty.

== Fourth century lists ==
In the Laterculus Veronensis, a document probably made in the early 4th century the Amsiuari appear in the list barbarian peoples who had spread under the emperors. They appear between the otherwise unknown Crinsiani and the Angrivarii in a part of the list which apparently describes peoples living near the Rhine.

In the Cosmography of Julius Honorius the Amsiuari appears in the list of Western peoples (gentes).

== Notitia Dignitatum ==
Shield pattern of the Ampsivarii. According to Notitia Dignitatum, there was an auxilia palatina, under the command of the magister peditum.

The Notitia Dignitatum, which lists Roman units and their insignia, indicates that a unit of Ampsiuarii recruited from western barbarians, as one of the new auxilia palatina units created in the 4th century, based in the Western Roman Empire.

== Sulpicius Alexander ==
In the 6th century Gregory of Tours quoted several accounts by Sulpicius Alexander, whose works are otherwise lost. One part of this mentioned that Arbogast (died 394), a Roman general with a Frankish background, crossed the Rhine and attacked the Franks from Roman Cologne, first ravaging the country of the Bructeri who were closest to the Rhine, and then the Chamavi. He faced no opposition but at one point a force of Chatti and Ampsivarii under the leadership of the Frank Marcomer was seen on a distant hill.

== See also ==
- List of ancient Germanic peoples
- Barbarian invasions

== Sources ==
- Wenskus, Reinhard (1973), "Amsivarier", in Beck, Heinrich; Geuenich, Dieter; Steuer, Heiko (eds.), Reallexikon der Germanischen Altertumskunde, vol. 1 (2 ed.), De Gruyter, ISBN 978-3-11-004489-8
- Lanting; van der Plicht (2010), "De ^{14}C-chronologie van de Nederlandse Pre- en Protohistorie VI: Romeinse tijd en Merovingische periode, deel A: historische bronnen en chronologische schema's", Palaeohistoria, vol. 51/52, p. 62, ISBN 978-90-77922-73-6
- Liccardo, Salvatore (2023), Old Names, New Peoples: Listing Ethnonyms in Late Antiquity, Brill, doi:10.1163/9789004686601
