= Quintinus (general) =

4th-century Roman general

Quintinus was a Roman general who was active in the 4th century during the reign of emperor Theodosius (378-395). As master of soldiers of the usurpator Magnus Maximus (383-388) he led an expedition on the Rhine against the Franks of Marcomer in 388. He asked for help from General Nannienus, who, however, refused. Quintinus was lured into an ambush and defeated.

== See also ==
- Frankish invasion of 388

== Literature ==
Sources

- Gregory of Tours, Histories, Book II - paragraph 9.
- Martindale, R.; Jones, A.H.M. (1971). The Prosopography of the Later Roman Empire. Vol. I AD 260-395. Cambridge University Press.
