= Quintinus =

Quintinus may refer to:

- Quintinus (general), 4th century Roman general
- Saint Quentin (died c. 287), also known as Saint Quintinus, early Christian saint and martyr
- Jean Quintin (1500–1561), also known as Johannes Quintinus, French priest, knight of the Order of St John and writer
