= Faramondo =

Opera by Handel

George Frideric Handel

Faramondo, HWV 39, is an opera in three acts by George Frideric Handel to an Italian libretto adapted from Apostolo Zeno's Faramondo. The story is loosely based upon the legend of Pharamond, a mythological King of the Franks, circa 420 AD, and the early history of France. The opera had its first performance at the King's Theatre, London, on 3 January 1738.

== Background ==
The German-born Handel, after spending some of his early career composing operas and other pieces in Italy, settled in London, where in 1711 he had brought Italian opera for the first time with his opera Rinaldo. An enormous success, Rinaldo created a craze in London for Italian opera seria, a form focused overwhelmingly on solo arias for the star virtuoso singers.

Handel had presented new operas in London for years with great success. One of the major attractions in Handel's operas was the star castrato Senesino, whose relationship with the composer was often stormy and who eventually left Handel's company to appear with the rival Opera of the Nobility, set up in 1733. Handel moved to a different theatre, Covent Garden, and engaged different singers, but there were neither sufficient audience for opera in London nor aristocratic supporters to back two opera houses at once, and both opera companies found themselves in difficulty. In 1737 the Opera of the Nobility collapsed into bankruptcy and what was left of its performers and resources combined with Handel's Covent Garden opera company, which returned to the King's Theatre, Haymarket, where his earlier operas had been presented.

None of Handel's three new operas in the 1736-37 season repeated the success of his earlier works, and he suffered a breakdown in his health, as reported by his friend Lord Shaftesbury:

"Great fatigue and disappointment, affected him so much, that he was this Spring struck with the Palsy, which took entirely away, the use of 4 fingers of his right hand; and totally disabled him from Playing: And when the heats of the Summer 1737 came on, the Disorder seemed at times to affect his Understanding."

Before composing new operas for the 1737-38 season, Handel went to "take the waters" at Aix-la Chapelle, where he made a complete recovery, so much so that it seemed to the nuns who operated the spa there to have been a miracle.

== Reception and performance history ==
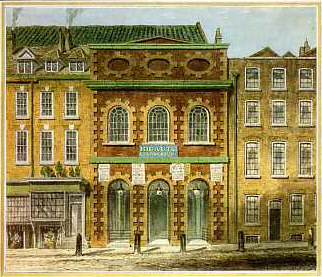
London King's Theatre Haymarket, where Faramondo was first performed

Zeno's libretto was first performed on 27 December 1698 to music by Carlo Francesco Pollarolo in Venice (Il Faramondo). In 1719 Nicola Porpora used it at the Teatro San Bartolomeo in Naples, and Francesco Gasparini at the Teatro Alibert in Rome. The libretto for Gasparini was considerably revised, and it was this version, after further removing about half the recitatives, that Handel used.

A London newspaper reported after the first performance on 3 January 1738 that "Last night the new opera of ‘Faramondo’ was perform’d at the King’s Theatre to a splendid Audience, and met with general Applause. It being the first Time of Mr. Handel’s Appearance this Season, he was honour’d with extraordinary and repeated signs of Approbation."

There were 8 performances that season and it was never revived. The first modern production was at the Handel Festival, Halle (then in East Germany), on 5 March 1976.

With the revival of interest in Baroque music and historically informed musical performance since the 1960s, Faramondo, like all Handel operas, is performed at festivals and opera houses today. The American premiere was performed in concert version by The Handel Opera Company in Berkeley, California, on 23 February 1985, Handel's 300th birthday. The performance was conducted from the harpsichord by Bruce Wetmore and used an English-language translation by Wetmore (recitatives) and Guy Pugh (arias). Among other performances, the Göttingen International Handel Festival staged a revival in 2014 (six performances), conducted by Laurence Cummings and directed by Paul Curran. This production served as the opera's Australian premiere during the 2015 Brisbane Baroque festival (four performances).

== Roles ==
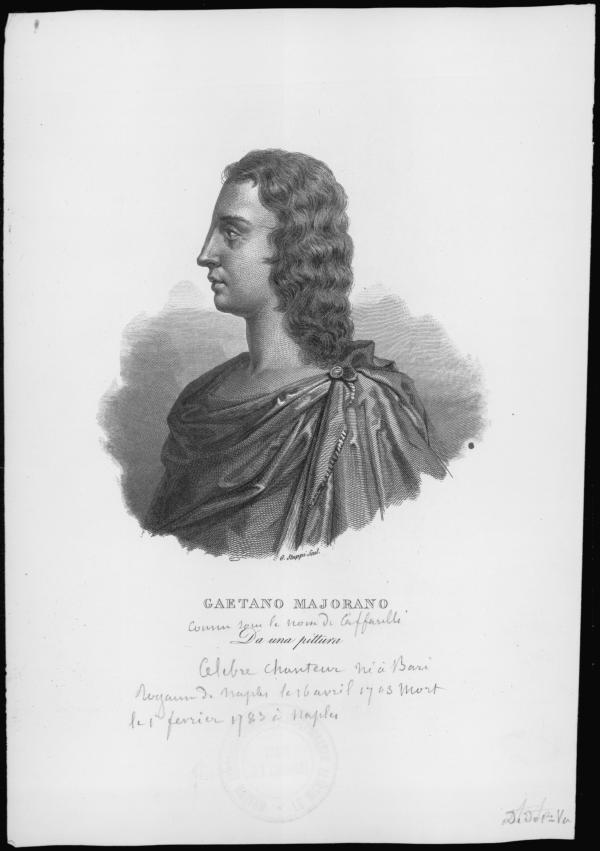
Caffarelli, who created the role of Faramondo

Roles, voice types, and premiere cast
| Role | Voice type | Premiere cast, 3 January 1738 |
|---|---|---|
| Faramondo, King of the Franks | mezzo-soprano castrato | Gaetano Majorano known as "Caffarelli" |
| Clotilde, his sister | soprano | Élisabeth Duparc |
| Gustavo, King of the Cimbrians | bass | Antonio Montagnana |
| Rosimonda, his daughter | mezzo-soprano | Maria Antonia Marchesini ("La Lucchesina") |
| Adolfo, his son | soprano | Margherita Chimenti ("La Droghierina") |
| Gernando, King of the Suebi | contralto | Antonia Merighi |
| Teobaldo, general of the Cimbrians | bass | Antonio Lottini |
| Childerico, his supposed son, confidant of Rosimonda | soprano | William Savage |
Soldiers, people, messengers, servants

== Instrumentation ==
The score calls for traverso flute, two oboes, two baroque horns, string section, basso continuo (cello, lute, harpsichord).

== Synopsis ==
=== Act 1 ===
A cyprus grove with an altar

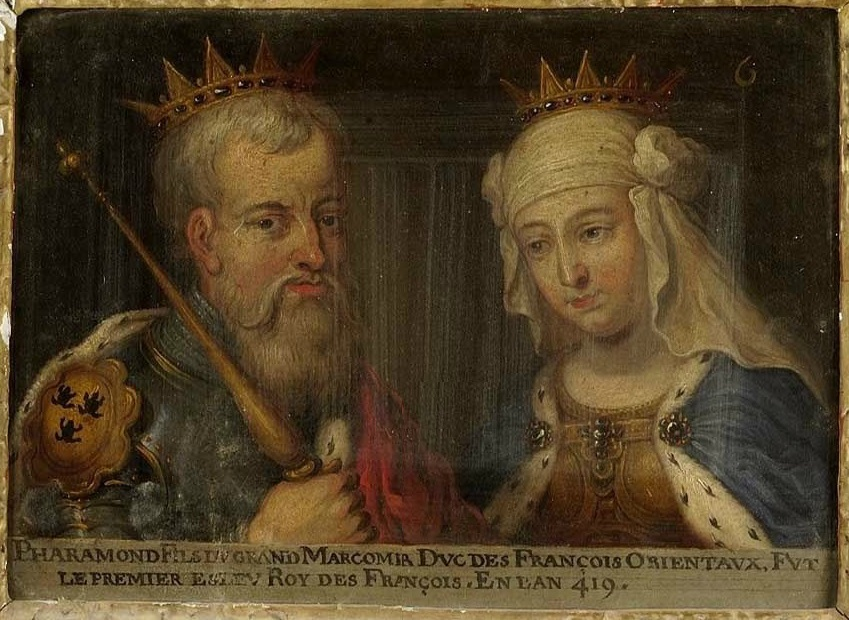
Pharamond, King of the Franks, and his wife Argotte

Gustavo (King of the Cimbrians) solemnly swears vengeance upon Faramondo (King of the Franks), by whose hands Gustavo's son Sveno was slain. The man who brings King Gustavo Faramondo's head will be rewarded with Gustavo's daughter Rosimonda's hand in marriage and his throne. Into this tense situation comes the captured Princess Clotilde (sister to Faramondo), whom Prince Adolfo, Gustavo's surviving son, loves – and it is only by his pleading for her that Clotilde is not slain. Once the two young lovers are left alone, Clotilde extracts a promise from Adolfo to change his allegiance to her brother Faramondo, for love of her.

A room in the palace

Immediately after, Gustavo's daughter Rosimonda finds her quarters invaded by Frankish soldiers, including Faramondo. Faramondo is instantly struck with love for his fair captive. Even while she rails at him for killing her brother Sveno in battle, and for making an alliance with the Swabian king (Gernando) who is at enmity with the Cimbrians, Rosimonda too finds her heart captured by her erstwhile enemy, Faramondo.

But their sudden love is hindered; King Gernando has plans to keep Rosimonda for himself, and he suspects that Faramondo is not immune to the princess. His plot to kill Faramondo and win Rosimonda is foiled, but Faramondo spares his life.

The Cimbrian camp

King Gustavo is not idle in the meantime, for he has arranged his men to capture Faramondo when he learns that his enemy is actually in his very palace. Clotilde of course wants Adolfo to prevent this, and when Adolfo acts on her behalf to save her brother, it is scarcely surprising that a truly dreadful confrontation between Adolfo and his father ensues, which ends with Adolfo being imprisoned for treason. Faramondo's attempt to appease Gustavo and ask for Rosimonda's hand in marriage meets with the lack of success one could have anticipated, for Gustavo desires nothing but his enemy's death.

=== Act 2 ===
A surprising meeting occurs – for Gernando, once the relentless enemy of the Cimbrians, suggests an alliance to King Gustavo, based on a mutual desire to bring down Faramondo. Gernando secures Gustavo's agreement that if he can bring Gustavo the head of Faramondo, Gustavo will give him his daughter Rosimonda in marriage.

Rosimonda, though still in love with Faramondo, hides her feelings and tries to make Faramondo leave without her, and this so depresses Faramondo that he does not even bother to resist when Gustavo's soldiers take him. Rosimonda's intervention prevents his death, but sees him imprisoned; at least Adolfo is freed upon Rosimonda's and Clotilde's repeated pleading.

Rosimonda is now so beset with worry for Faramondo's safety that she can no longer hide her love, and plans to free Faramondo herself and flee with him.

=== Act 3 ===
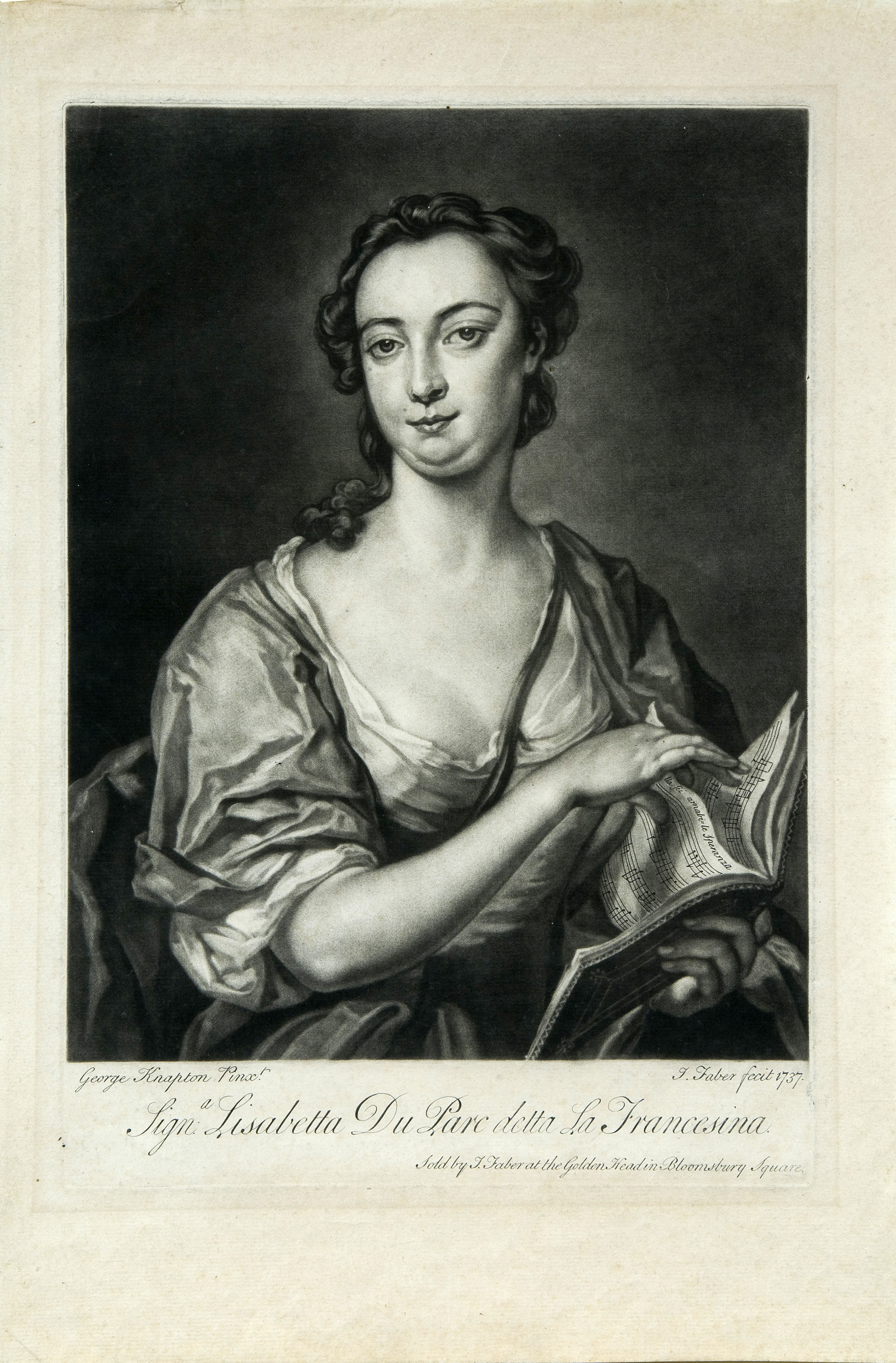
Élisabeth Duparc, who created the role of Clotilde

Gustavo finds himself betrayed on all sides – Rosimonda has released Faramondo, and his son Adolfo is still stubbornly in love with Faramondo's sister. But Rosimonda is not out of danger, for she is still the love-object of Gernando. Gernando has actually joined forces with a lieutenant of King Gustavo (by name, Teobaldo), persuading Teobaldo to abduct Rosimonda for him. Teobaldo's plans do not stop at this, but he and his men attempt a coup to take Gustavo himself hostage. This sudden turn of events is stopped by Faramondo (who had overheard the entire plot, sent his men to rescue his beloved Rosimonda, and personally stopped the coup attempt). Gustavo embraces his unknown rescuer (whose armour hides his face), and when he realises who had saved him and his daughter, bitterly regrets that his oath MUST be carried out... He must still sacrifice Faramondo in blood-vengeance because of Faramondo's slaying of his son Sveno.

Teobaldo, forgiven by Gustavo, is sent off to fight for the king in Sarmazia.

Rosimonda, whose fate might have been dire but for her successful rescue by Faramondo's men, returns to her father's court, with news that the treacherous Gernando has been captured. But she is in time only to see her father lead Faramondo to the altar in preparation for the blood-oath sacrifice. Disaster lies upon Faramondo – one stroke of the weapon, and he will lie dead... but for the sudden news brought by a messenger direct from Teobaldo. In the letter, Teobaldo (who lies dying of many wounds incurred in Sarmazia) admits that he had not turned suddenly against Gustavo, but rather that his desire to oust Gustavo of his position had been long in the planning. He had in fact switched infants when the king's son was born; in other words, Sveno was NOT the king's son... but Teobaldo's. It slowly sinks in to all present that, since Sveno was not Gustavo's son, Gustavo does not need to kill Faramondo. All ends happily with general rejoicing; Gustavo and Faramondo cry friends, Gernando is released and realises only too late what an ally he had lost in the noble Faramondo, Clotilde and Adolfo are united, and so too are Rosimonda and Faramondo.

== Recordings ==
- 1996: Julianne Baird, Drew Minter, D'Anna Fortunato, Jennifer Lane, Mary Ellen Callahan, Peter Castaldi; Brewer Chamber Orchestra; Edward Brewer (harpsichord); Rudolph Palmer (conductor). Audio CD: Vox Classics 3-7536 ("World premiere recording"). Re-released as Brilliant 99777-21/23
- 2007: I Barocchisti; Max Emanuel Cenčić, Philippe Jaroussky, Fulvio Bettini, In-Sung Sim, Terry Wey, Xavier Sabata, Marina De Liso, Sophie Karthäuser, Duilio Galfetti; Diego Fasolis (conductor). Audio CD: Virgin 2166112
