= Marcomer =

4th-century Frankish leader

Marcomer, also spelled Marcomeres, Marchomer, or Marchomir (c. ? - 392) was a Frankish Dux in the late 4th century who assisted in an invasion of the Roman Empire in the year 388, as the usurper and leader of the whole of Roman Gaul, Magnus Maximus, was surrounded by Theodosius I in the city of Aquileia.

== History ==
The invasion is documented by Gregory of Tours who cited the now lost work of Sulpicius Alexander. According to this account, Marcomer, Sunno and Genobaud invaded the Roman provinces Germania Inferior and Gallia Belgica in Gaul. They broke through the limes, killed many people, destroyed the most fruitful lands and made the city of Cologne panic.

After this raid, the main body of the Franks moved back over the Rhine with their booty. Some of the Franks remained in the Belgian wood called "Silva Carbonaria". When the Roman generals Magnus Maximus, Nanninus and Quintinus heard the news in Trier, they attacked those remaining Frankish forces near the Silva Carbonaria and killed many of them. After this engagement, Quintinus crossed the Rhine to punish the Franks in their own country, however his army was surrounded and beaten. Some Roman soldiers drowned in the marshes, others were killed by Franks; few made it back to the Empire.

Nanninus and Quintinus were replaced by Charietto and Syrus, who were again confronted by an attack of unidentified Franks.

Later, after the 388 fall of Magnus Maximus, Marcomer and Sunno held a short meeting about the recent attacks with the Frank Arbogastes, who was a general (magister militum) in the Roman army. The Franks delivered hostages as usual, and Arbogastes returned to his winter quarters in Trier.

A couple of years later when Arbogastes had seized power and the West Roman army was dominated by Frankish officers, he crossed the Rhine with a Roman army into Germania. Marcomer was seen as leader with Chatti and Ampsivarii but the two did not engage.

Later we hear from the poet Claudian that Marcomer was captured by Romans and exiled to a villa in Tuscany. His brother Sunno crossed the Rhine and tried to become leader of the band of Marcomer, but was killed by his own people.

According to the later Liber Historiae Francorum, Marcomer was a descendant of the Trojans and a son of a king called Priam. The Liber also relates that Marcomer tried to unite the Franks after the death of Sunno. He proposed that the Franks should live under one king and proposed his own son Pharamond (whose earliest mention is in this work, and who is considered legendary by scholars) for the kingship. This source does not relate whether Marcomer succeeded, but from other later sources that recall the account of Liber Historiae Francorum, the impression may be gained that Pharamond was regarded as the first king of the Franks. However, modern scholars, such as Edward James, do not accept this account in the Liber Historiae Francorum as historical.

== See also ==
- Frankish invasion of 388
- Clovis I

== Sources ==
- Gregory of Tours, Historia Francorum, Book II, paragraph 9.
- Claudian, Loeb Classical Library, On Stilicho's Consulship (translation Platnauer)
