= Nannienus =

Roman military commander

Nannienus (also Nannenus, or Naniemus, Nanninus), (c. 350 AD), was a late Roman military commander in the Western Roman Empire.

In 370, as Comes rei militaris under the Emperor Valentinian I he fought the Saxons. In 378, under the Emperor Gratian, together with the comes domesticorum Mallobaudes, he defeated the Lentienses, a group of Alamanni, at the Battle of Argentovaria. It is suggested that at this time he may have been comes utriusque Germaniae, since he was of the same rank as Mallobaudes. It is also conjectured that he was the magister militum Nanninus who served the Emperor Magnus Maximus, defeated the Franks, and served as guardian of Magnus' son Flavius Victor.

== See also ==
- Frankish invasion of 388
