= Battle of Argentovaria =

Battle between Romans and Germans in 378

Coordinates: 48.081667°N 7.355556°E

- Part of the Roman–Germanic Wars
Date	378
Location	Argentovaria, near Colmar (modern-day France)
Result	Roman victory

Belligerents
Western Roman Empire	Lentienses

Commanders and leaders
Mallobaudes; Nannienus	Priarius †

Strength
Unknown	40,000

Casualties and losses
Unknown	31,000 dead

The Battle of Argentovaria or Battle of Argentaria was fought in May 378 between the Western Roman Empire and the invading army of the Lentienses, a branch of the Alemanni, at Argentovaria (near Colmar, France). The Alemanni were overwhelmed by the Roman legionaries, though stood their ground bravely. Only 9,000 escaped from the field and Priarius, king of the Lentienses, was slain during the battle. The Lentienses disappear from the historical record following this defeat.

Emperor Gratian, who had given the command of the army for the battle to Nannienus and Mallobaudes, gained the title of Alemannicus Maximus.
