= Pharamond =

Legendary early king of the Franks

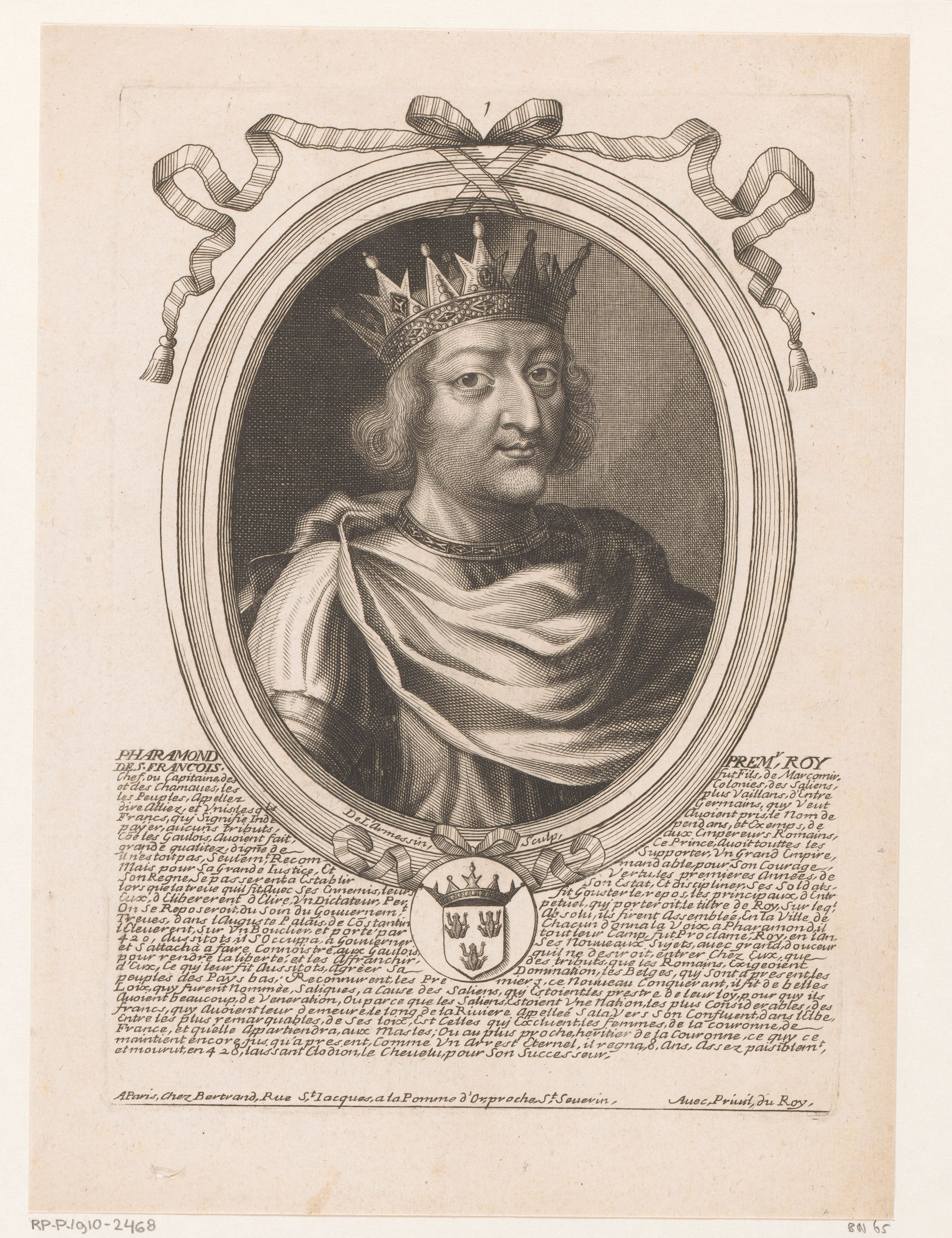
16th-century depiction of Pharamond as "the first king of France"

Pharamond, also spelled Faramund, is a legendary early king of the Franks, first referred to in the anonymous 8th-century Liber Historiae Francorum, which depicts him as the first king of the Franks.

== Historical sources and scholarship ==
Pharamond first appears in the Liber Historiae Francorum, commonly dated to 727. After relating the legendary Trojan origin of the Franks (which is copied in main from the Chronicle of Fredegar), the Liber reports that after the death of the Frankish leader Sunno, his brother Marcomer proposed to the Franks that they should have one single king, contrary to their tradition. The Liber adds that Pharamond, named as Marcomer's son, was chosen as "long-haired" (crinitus) king. When he died, his son Chlodio was raised up as the next king.

Because there is no reference to Pharamond in any source prior to this work, scholars generally consider him a legendary rather than historical figure. In contrast to his depiction as a sole king, several sources, for example Gregory of Tours, attest multiple Frankish rulers in his time (that is, before ca. 428). The first king to unite all Franks was actually Clovis I. According to Rosamond McKitterick, the emphasis of the Liber was upon "construct[ing] a specific past for a particular group of people."

As first king of the Franks, Pharamond was also associated with establishing the Salic law, as noted, for example in the Gesta Francorum (c.1100), chapter 8.

Later sources, such as the universal chronicle of Sigebert of Gembloux, list Pharamond as King of the Franks between Marcomer and Chlodio:

Post Marcomirum filius ejus Faramundus fuit, rex crinitus, a quo Franci crinitos reges habere coeperunt. Post quem Clodius filius ejus regnans Francis a Thoringia advectis Gallias invasit, et capta urbe Tornaco Cameracum usque progressus multos Romanorum in Galliis peremit.

== In literature ==
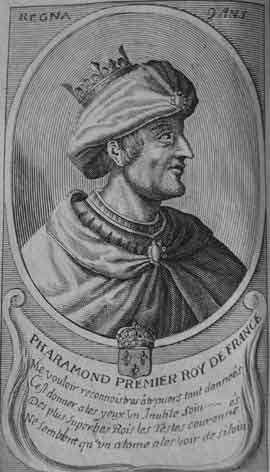
16th-century depiction of Pharamond as "the first king of France"

A Pharamond appears as the king of France in the Prose Tristan and later Arthurian works.

In William Shakespeare's Henry V, Pharamond is mentioned as the originator of the Salic law, especially its banning women from succession to the throne of France.

He appears as the title character in the opera Faramondo by George Frideric Handel.

A character named Pharamond appears in the Sandman and Lucifer comics series.

Victor Hugo's novel The Hunchback of Notre-Dame mentions Pharamond after Jehan Frollo's arrow pierces the left arm of Quasimodo the hunchback: "This no more disturbed Quasimodo than a scratch would have bothered King Pharamond." (Cobb translation)

Faramund is the faction leader of the Franks and a playable character in the PC video game Total War: Attila when beginning a Grand Campaign, with a begin date of 395 AD. He is the son of the former deceased faction leader Marcomer.

A descendant of the French kings, named Pharamond after his ancestor ("first king of France"), is the main character in Jean Raspail's novel Sire.

== Literature ==
- Liber Historiae Francorum, translated by Bernard S. Bachrach. Coronado Press, 1973.
- Gregory of Tours. Historia Francorum.
- McKitterick, Rosamond. History and Memory in the Carolingian World. 1st Ed. Cambridge: Cambridge University Press, 2004.
- Wood, Ian. The Merovingian Kingdoms. Pearson Education, 1994.
