= Mattium =

Principal settlement of the Chatti

Suspected area for the location of Mattium

Mattium was the ancient "capital" or principal settlement (Latin: "caput gentis") of the Chatti. Its exact location is unknown, though following the description of Tacitus it is generally assumed to be somewhere in the wider neighbourhood of Fritzlar in northern Hesse (Germany).

== Location ==
Tacitus mentions Mattium in his Annals, when he describes the Roman campaign against the Chatti under the command of Germanicus in 15 AD. According to him the Roman army destroyed the caput gentis Mattium, directly after it crossed the river Adrana (Eder). Aside from Tacitus' description placing Mattium north of the Eder, there is also some linguistic analysis suggesting that the names of the villages Maden and Metze and the brook Matzoff might be derived from Mattium and hence Mattium might be located in their neighbourhood. However, so far there are no archeological findings which would provide an exact location and confirm the description of Tacitus or the linguistic analysis.

The Altenburg, an ancient fortified site, in the same neighbourhood, was often equated with Mattium in older literature. However, more recent research, in particular the dating of archeological artefacts from the site, has concluded that the site was already abandoned decades before the Roman troops destroyed Mattium. Therefore, the Altenburg is not considered a suitable candidate for Mattium anymore.

The term caput gentis being used by Tacitus may not only denote a capital in the sense of a single large fortified settlement, but it could also refer to a central place of worship. In the latter case it is conceivable that Mattium comprised a larger area consisting of various ritual sites and settlements connected to them rather than being a single central settlement.

== Mattiacum ==
Mattium is not to be confused with Mattiacum (Wiesbaden), also called Aquae Mattiacorum, which was the principal settlement of the Mattiaci. The Mattiaci were a separate tribe that lived between the Rhine river and the Taunus mountain range. Contrary to the Chatti they became incorporated into the Roman empire when the Limes Germanicus was built.

The similarity between Mattiaci and Mattium and the fact that Mattiaci could be understood as "people from Mattium" has led some scholars to believe, that the Mattiaci might be related to the Chatti and had split off from them at an earlier time.

== Historical sources ==
- Tacitus: Annals. Book I Chapter 56 (online copy)
