= Mallobaudes =

Fourth-century Frankish ruler

Mallobaudes or Mellobaudes was a 4th-century Frankish king who also held the Roman title of comes domesticorum. In 354 he was a tribunus armaturarum in the Roman army in Gaul, where he served under Silvanus, who usurped power in 355. Mallobaudes tried unsuccessfully to intervene on his behalf. Appointed comes domesticorum by Gratian, he was second-in-command of the army in Gaul in 378 when he defeated the Alemannic tribes under King Priarius at Battle of Argentovaria (near modern Colmar) according to Ammianus Marcellinus. In 380 he killed Macrian, king of the Bucinobantes and Roman ally, who had invaded Frankish territory. During the usurpation of Maximus, Mallobaudes was killed shortly after the assassination of the emperor Gratian.

== Sources ==
- Ammianus Marcellinus, 'The Later Roman Empire (A.D.354-378), Book 31.10.2', trans. Walter Hamilton, Penguin Books, 1986.
