= Priarius =

Priarius ( - 378) was a king of the Lentienses, a sub-tribe of the Alemanni, in the 4th century. He is mentioned by Ammianus Marcellinus. In 378, Priarius fought the Western Roman Empire at Battle of Argentovaria, near Neuf-Brisach, France, in which he was defeated and killed.
