= Genobaud (4th century) =

Fourth-century Frankish ruler

Genobaud was a leader (dux) of the Franks. He invaded the Roman Empire in the year 388.

This invasion is documented by Gregory of Tours, who cited the now lost work of Sulpicius Alexander. According to this account Genobaud invaded the Roman provinces Germania and Belgia together with Marcomer and Sunno. They broke through the limes, killed many people, destroyed the most fruitful lands and made the city of Colonia Claudia Ara Agrippinensium, now Cologne, panic. After this raid the main body of the Franks moved back over the Rhine with their booty. Some of the Franks remained in the Belgian woods. When the Roman generals Nanninus and Quintinus heard the news in Trier, they attacked those remaining Frankish forces and killed many of them. After this engagement Quintinus crossed the Rhine to punish the Franks in their own country; however, his army was surrounded and beaten. Some Roman soldiers drowned in the marshes, others were killed by Franks, and but few made it back to their Empire.

A connection to the 3rd century Frankish warrior Genobaud, is possible, but has not been proven.

== See also ==
- Frankish invasion of 388

== Sources ==
- Gregory of Tours, Historia Francorum, Book II, paragraph 9.
