= Genobaud (3rd century) =

Third-century Frankish king

Genobaud (or Gennoboudes) was a Frankish king in the third century AD, and one of the first people described as a Frank in contemporary records, albeit indirectly. In the winter of 287/88, he submitted to western Roman emperor Maximian (r. AD 286 – 305) and became a client king. The exact circumstances leading to this are uncertain. He had possibly suffered a military defeat at Maximian's hands, although there are also indications that Gennoboudes surrendered without a fight. Both the location of his original home territory, and the location where he and his people subsequently lived, are the subject of scholarly speculations.

== Submission to Maximian ==
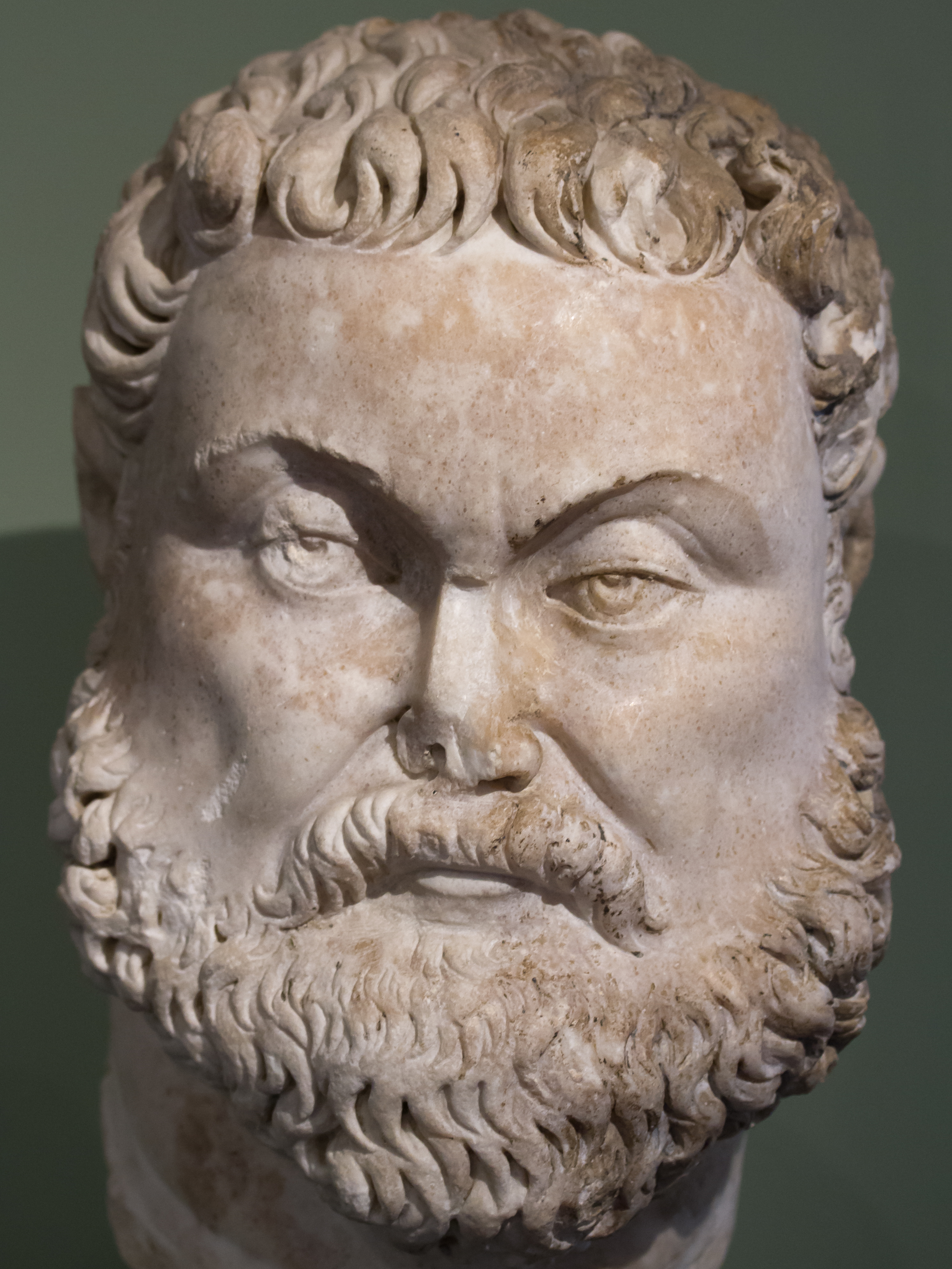
Bust of Emperor Maximian

The tenth Latin Panegyric, written about 289 AD, is the only contemporary source that clearly names Gennoboudes, but it does not call him a Frank. It only explains that Maximian granted him a kingdom (regnum), by making his authority over his people a Roman office (munus), indicating both Roman backing, and obligation to Rome. However, it is generally assumed he is the same Frankish king mentioned in the eleventh panegyric, dedicated to Maximian's co-emperor Diocletian (r. AD 284 – 305). This means he was the first known Frankish king. Indeed, the eleventh panegyric, written about 291, is the oldest surviving record to explicitly name the Franks as contemporaries. The author of this eleventh panegyric remarked in passing that a Frankish king had in this period sued for peace, saying however that he will not go into "those things which were done by the fear of your arms as if accomplished by arms: the Franks coming with their king to seek peace and the Parthian soliciting your favor with wonderful gifts".

Gennoboudes was clearly already a ruler prior to these events, but the tenth panegyric claims that he was finally able to rule with full authority, thanks to his new position as a client of Maximian. Praising the emperor, the author of the tenth panegyric says Gennoboudes "displayed you repeatedly, I hear, to his people, and ordered them to rest their gaze upon you for a long time, and to learn submissiveness, since he himself was subject to you".

At the time when Gennoboudes brought his people (gens) to see him, Maximian's headquarters were in Trier, in present-day Germany, near Luxembourg. From here, he and his commanders had previously undertaken several invasions across the Rhine in the period prior to the surrender. A particularly successful campaign over the Rhine, mentioned in both the tenth and eleventh panegyrics, was apparently in the summer of 287 AD. This would make it immediately prior to the surrender of Gennoboudes, which leads many scholars to believe that his people were defeated in that campaign. The author of the tenth panegyric emphasizes how Maximian had put Rome in control of the eastern side of the Rhine, reducing the fear that Romans in this region felt when the water level in the Rhine dropped. Not long before the surrender, unnamed barbarians had even invaded Trier itself on 1 January 287, at the moment when Maximian was being invested with a consulship. Gennoboudes may therefore have been among the defeated barbarians of this period. On the other hand, the eleventh panegyric implies that Gennoboudes surrendered without a fight, so he and his people might never have been in direct battle against the Romans. Other opponents of Maximian east of the Rhine near Trier included the Alamanni and Burgundians.

Some scholars associate Gennoboudes and his people with regions far to the north of Trier, near the Rhine delta in the present day Netherlands, where Franks including the Chamavi were active within Roman territory. Verlinden, for example, believed Gennoboudes was king of the Franks known to later history as the Salians, while Ewig and others believed they were Chamavi. This region was at the time lost to Roman control, and was not recovered until after the tenth and eleventh panegyrics, in the years 294-305 AD, by Maximian's son-in-law Constantius Chlorus. The eleventh panegyric however mentions that "the pirates" who Maximian was at war with were already suppressed before 291 AD "when the Franks were subdued". For this reason it is suggested that the Franks in this period, possibly including those of Gennoboudes, had been coordinating with the Roman rebel Carausius, referred to in the panegyrics as a pirate. Carausius was himself originally from the region south of the Rhine delta, and had been entrusted with defending Rome from pirates described by much later writers as Franks and Saxons. The eighth panegyric, dedicated to Constantius and written about 297 AD, also reports that Carausius used Frankish mercenaries in Britain. While a largescale alliance between the Franks as a whole and Carausius is possible, it remains however uncertain.

While some scholars believe that Gennoboudes and his people lived near the Rhine delta, and continued to do so, others have suggested that they were moved deeper into the Roman empire after their submission to Rome. The eighth panegyric, which was written some years later in 297 for Maximian's son-in-law Constantius Chlorus, remarked that at the bidding of Maximian, "the Franks, admitted to our laws, have cultivated the empty fields of the Arvii and the Treveri". Some scholars therefore believe that a treaty (foedus) followed the surrender providing for the settlement of these Franks within Roman territory in the countries of both the Arvii (near present day Le Mans), and the Treveri, whose city was Trier. The Franks of Gennoboudes were therefore possibly settled on the Roman side of the frontier, and possibly near Trier itself. The eighth panegyric represents the first recorded instance in Gaul of a new policy whereby the Romans sought to repopulate depopulated areas in Gaul through resettlement of defeated barbarian tribes. On the other hand some scholars note that although the eighth panegyric is "the earliest mention of Laeti", they are in that text "spoken of as an established institution".

== Name ==
While kinship with a later Genobaud, a Frankish leader about one century later, is not provable, it is considered plausible by scholars. In the later Merovingian period, the name (in the form Gennobaud) was apparently common in the Frankish nobility. For example, the first bishop of Laon had this name.

Unlike Gennobaudes in the fourth century, the tenth panegyric in the third century, which was the first time this name was attested, spelled the name as "Gennoboudes". This vowel sound is not expected for names derived from Proto-Germanic, and so some scholars believe this spelling could indicate Celtic influence, if not scribal error. More generally, both parts of the name are associated with earlier Celtic names, but ancient Celtic and Germanic names sometimes had similar two-part forms.

- The first part of the name stems from the Indo-European root *gen-, meaning "to beget". (Derivatives include modern Irish gin, as an example of Celtic, and modern English kin, as an example of Germanic.)
- The second part of the name is from Proto-Celtic *boudi-, meaning "victory", which is found not only in Celtic names such as Boudica, but also in names such as Maroboduus, who is believed to have been a Germanic speaker with a Celtic (or Celtic-influenced) name. The -baudes ending used in contemporary records for the 4th century Frank named Gennobaud, could also reflect a Germanic root biudan.

== Bibliography ==
- Barnes, T D (1974). "Another forty missing persons (AD 260–395)". Phoenix. 28 (2): 224–233. doi:10.2307/1087420. ISSN 0031-8299. JSTOR 1087420.
- Castritius, Helmut (1998). "Gennobaudes, §2 Historisches". In Beck, Heinrich; Geuenich, Dieter; Steuer, Heiko (eds.). Reallexikon der Germanischen Altertumskunde. Vol. 11 (2 ed.). De Gruyter. pp. 77–79. ISBN 978-3-11-015832-8.
- Doležal, Stanislav (2019). "The political and military aspects of accession of Constantine the Great". Graeco-Latina Brunensia. 24 (2): 19–32. doi:10.5817/GLB2019-2-2. ISSN 1803-7402.
- Goltz, Andreas (2004). "Franken und Alamannen zur Zeit der Tetrarchie – Überlegungen zu ihrer Ersterwähnung und Ethnogenese vor dem Hintergrund tetrarchischer Herrschaftsstrukturen". Diokletian und die Tetrarchie. pp. 95–114. doi:10.1515/9783110914603.95. ISBN 978-3-11-091460-3.
- Martindale, John R (1974). "Prosopography of the Later Roman Empire: addenda et corrigenda to volume 1". Historia: Zeitschrift für Alte Geschichte. 23 (2): 246–252. ISSN 0018-2311. JSTOR 4435397.
- Musset, Lucien (1993). The Germanic invasions: the making of Europe, AD 400-600. Translated by James, Edward; James, Columba. New York: Barnes & Noble Books. ISBN 978-1-56619-326-9.
- Nixon, C E V; Rodgers, Barbara Saylor (1994). In praise of later Roman emperors: the Panegyrici Latini. Berkeley: University of California Press. ISBN 0-520-08326-1 – via Internet Archive.
- Nonn, Ulrich (2010). Die Franken. Kohlhammer. ISBN 978-3-17-017814-4. OCLC 610820132.
- Reichert, Hermann (1998a). "Gainas §1 Namenkundliches". In Beck, Heinrich; Geuenich, Dieter; Steuer, Heiko (eds.). Reallexikon der Germanischen Altertumskunde. Vol. 10 (2 ed.). De Gruyter. p. 317. ISBN 978-3-11-015102-2.
- Reichert, Hermann (1998b). "Gennobaudes, §1 Sprachliches". In Beck, Heinrich; Geuenich, Dieter; Steuer, Heiko (eds.). Reallexikon der Germanischen Altertumskunde. Vol. 11 (2 ed.). De Gruyter. p. 77. ISBN 978-3-11-015832-8.
- Runde, Ingo (1998). "Die Franken und Alemannen vor 500. Ein chronologischer Überblick". In Geuenich, Dieter (ed.). Die Franken und die Alemannen bis zur "Schlacht bei Zülpich" (496/97). De Gruyter. ISBN 978-3-11-015826-7.
- Tiefenbach, Heinrich (2001). "Merobaudes, §1 Namenkundliches". In Beck, Heinrich; Geuenich, Dieter; Steuer, Heiko (eds.). Reallexikon der Germanischen Altertumskunde. Ergänzungsbände zum Reallexikon der Germanischen Altertumskunde. Vol. 19 (2 ed.). De Gruyter. pp. 571–572. doi:10.1515/9783110804348. ISBN 978-3-11-017163-1.
- Verlinden, Charles (1954), "Frankish Colonization: A New Approach", Transactions of the Royal Historical Society, 4: 1–17, doi:10.2307/3678849, JSTOR 3678849
