= Fragmenta Valesiana =

Fragmenta Valesiana is the name given to fragments of Roman text written by Cassius Dio, dispersed throughout various writers, scholastics, grammarians, lexicographers, etc., and collected by Henri de Valois.
