= Lentienses =

4th-century Germanic tribe

The Lentienses (German Lentienser) were a 4th-century Germanic tribe associated with the Alemanni, in the region between the river Danube in the North, the river Iller in the East, and Lake Constance in the South, in what is now southern Germany. They were reported to be one of the most rebellious tribes at the time. There are only two mentions of the Lentienses, both by the Roman historian Ammianus Marcellinus (330–395).

First, they appeared in 355 when the Roman commander Arbetio was ordered by Emperor Constantius II to fine the Lentienses for several incursions of the Roman Empire. Secondly, they were mentioned when they crossed the frozen Rhine in February 378, invading the Roman Empire. They were defeated by the Roman emperor Gratianus in the Battle of Argentovaria (modern Colmar in Alsace), when their king, Priarius, died. This battle was the last campaign by any Roman Emperor behind the Limes area. It was also the last time the name Lentienses was mentioned in historical documents.

The Latin name "Lentienes" was formed from the name of the Celtic village Lentia; today a region north of Lake Constance is called Linzgau.

== Literature ==
- Stather, Hans (1997). "Fragen zu den Lentiensern". Hegau (in German). 53 (41): 5–12. ISSN 0438-9034.

== See also ==
- List of Germanic tribes
