= Charietto =

Germanic warrior

Charietto was an Ancient German headhunter and bounty hunter who worked for the Romans. He operated on the Rhine frontier near Treverorum.

According to Zosimus, Charietto saw barbarian raiders crossing the Rhine and determined to take action. Going out into the forest at night he would kill a number of the raiders, sever their heads and bring them into the town come daytime. Charietto was joined by other men, and eventually their success earned him the admiration of Julian, who was commander in the region and later became the Emperor known as Julian the Apostate. Charietto was encouraged by Julian to attack the barbarian raiders at night, while Roman regular forces would confront them by day. After a long period of such activities, the raiders surrendered.

Ammianus Marcellinus, the other major chronicler for the life of the Emperor Julian, also refers to a figure named Charietto, in this case a Roman general who was killed resisting an excursion by the Alamanni at Cabillonum in 366 or 367. While there is no conclusive evidence linking this individual with Charietto the headhunter, some scholars have assumed a connection.
