= Arbogast (magister militum) =

Roman army officer (died 394)

Magister militum Arbogastes
- Born: 4th century Galatia Minor
- Died: 8 September 394; Near the Frigidus River
- Other names: Arbogast, Arbogastiz
- Military career
- Allegiance: Western Roman Empire
- Service years: ? – 394
- Rank: Magister militum
- Conflicts: Gothic War (376-382); Frankish invasion of 388; Battle of the Frigidus †

Arbogast or Arbogastes (died 8 September 394) was a Roman army officer of Frankish origin. He won distinction in the service of the emperor Gratian, and was subsequently entrusted by Theodosius I with the guardianship of the underage Valentinian II. After the death of Valentinian under suspicious circumstances, and the subsequent elevation of Eugenius to Augustus of the Western Roman Empire by Arbogast, a civil war ensued in which both Eugenius and Arbogast perished.

== Early career ==
John of Antioch records details about Arbogast's family that are uncorroborated by any other sources and are thus doubted by some historians. He says Bauto was Arbogast's father, and Richomeres was his uncle. Although all these men were Franks, this does not mean they were related, and perhaps John of Antioch, writing from the Eastern Empire well after these events took place, mistakenly assumed they were. Zosimus, without ascribing a familial relationship, says Arbogast and Bauto were both "Franks by birth, exceedingly well-disposed to the Romans, completely immune to bribes, and outstanding as regards warfare in brain and brawn".

Arbogast first appears in the historical record in 381, when Gratian, the emperor of the western Roman Empire, sent him to accompany the army which Bauto was leading into the Balkans to aid the eastern Empire in the Gothic War. At this point Bauto was probably already a magister militum, and Arbogast was some kind of deputy commander, although whether he had a specific title or not remains unknown. The combined western and eastern armies defeated the Gothic leader Fritigern, pushing his forces out of Macedonia and Thessaly towards Thrace in lower Moesia where the raids had begun, and ultimately aided the establishment of a peace treaty with the Goths in 382. Bauto and Arbogast then returned to Gratian in Mediolanum.

=== Revolt of Magnus Maximus ===
In the following year, a Roman officer in Britain named Magnus Maximus was proclaimed emperor by his soldiers, and quickly moved to the continent to challenge Gratian's control of the western provinces. Gratian led his army into Gaul, where the magister militum Merobaudes was already commander. Consequently, Bauto and Arbogast were left in Italy with Valentinian II, Gratian's younger half-brother who was also a full emperor. Valentinian had been raised to the throne at the age of four; his youth and inexperience meant that, despite his title, he was a junior ruler with no actual power.

The loyalist and rebel armies skirmished for five days near Paris until Gratian's army deserted him and joined with Maximus. Gratian fled but was captured and executed shortly afterwards. His death allowed Valentinian II to undergo a second, real accession as emperor, establishing control over the Italian peninsula, while Maximus held onto Gaul and Britain in an unofficial armistice.

At an undetermined point during the mid 380s, Bauto died and Arbogast took over his position. Records indicate that Arbogast's good reputation allowed him to assume Bauto's position as magister militum of the Italian army without Valentinian II's assent, although if Valentinian actually resisted the appointment is not made clear. Arbogast's experience and familiarity with the army likely made him an obvious choice for commander, given the precarious state of the armistice. One should also important to acknowledge that no ancient sources ever give Arbogast a specific title; because he was clearly the dominant military commander in the west for much of his career, he is assumed to have been magister militum, the highest rank in the Roman army. Ultimately, his exact title means little compared to the actual power he wielded.

In 387, when Maximus finally broke the peace by invading Italy, Valentinian fled with his family, courtiers, and generals to Thessalonica on the very edge of western territory, where he pleaded with Theodosius I for assistance. The following year Theodosius' eastern army won a battle at Poetovio and Maximus fled to Aquileia, whose disaffected garrison arrested him and handed him over to Theodosius for execution. Arbogast went to Augusta Treverorum on the orders of Theodosius and assassinated Victor, Maximus' son and heir. Officially the territories of Maximus now fell to emperor Valentinian II, who had already ruled Italy on his 'own' (in reality under the influence of many different officials, including the generals), but Theodosius stayed in Italy to conduct the western Empire's civil and political affairs according to his own interests. This included installing men loyal to him into the western bureaucracy, most likely in the hope that one of his sons would inherit the western Empire in the future. Meanwhile, Valentinian was relegated to Augusta Treverorum, a frontier city from which he was unable to wield any political influence. In 391, when Theodosius returned to Constantinople, one of his final acts was to establish Arbogast as the unofficial guardian and overseer of Valentinian II, now headquartered in Vienne.

== Arbogast and Valentinian II ==
Possibly, because of his non-Roman ancestry, Arbogast could never exercise power as emperor in his own name and so used Valentinian II as a figurehead. Even if his ancestry was not disqualifying, Arbogast may have avoided the throne voluntarily, believing it to be easier, and safer, to control an emperor than to become emperor himself. Regardless, Valentinian was isolated in Vienne, his status essentially reduced to that of a private citizen. His court was dominated by allies of Arbogast, and the control of the Western armies belonged to Arbogast's Frankish mercenaries. The magister militum became increasingly violent towards Valentinian II and his councilors, and is said to have killed Harmonius, a friend of the Emperor who had been accused of taking bribes, in Valentinian's presence. Zosimus adds that the Western army respected Arbogast as "brave and experienced in warfare and contemptuous of money. And so he came to great power, such that even in the Emperor's presence he spoke quite freely, and he vetoed those actions which he thought were wrong or unbecoming...for Arbogastes was supported by the good will of all the soldiers." At this point, Valentinian began sending secret messages to both Theodosius I and Ambrose, Bishop of Mediolanum, pleading for them to come to his aid, and asking Ambrose for a baptism, perhaps in fear that he would die soon at the hands of Arbogast.

=== Death of Valentinian II ===
In 392, Valentinian II attempted to assert his authority and dismiss Arbogast from office. According to Zosimus, Arbogast replied, "You have neither given me my command nor will you be able to take it away," threw the order of dismissal to the ground in front of the whole court, and walked out. Soon after this encounter, Arbogast and Valentinian met again and began a discussion which grew heated; Philostorgius claims that the Emperor tried to stab Arbogast and was stopped by a palace guard. Shortly afterward on May 15, 392, Valentinian II was found hanged in his sleeping quarters. Declaring the death to be a suicide, Arbogast sent the corpse to Mediolanum for a proper funeral.

==== Debate about the death of Valentinian II ====
Ambrose claims that the death of Valentinian II was the result of a dispute with Arbogast, involving diplomacy and who would lead the armies defending Italy from Balkan invasions. Another roughly contemporary source, the ecclesiastical history of Tyrannius Rufinus, states that nobody was really sure whether it was a case of murder or of suicide. Later ancient historians such as Zosimus, Philostorgius, Socrates Scholasticus, and Paulus Orosius, all believed Valentinian was murdered by Arbogast. Edward Gibbon thought the death was the result of a conspiracy to replace one puppet emperor with another, leaving Arbogast as the true source of power. Conversely, modern scholars John Frederick Matthews and Brian Croke argue that Valentinian died by suicide. Croke points out that a four-month interregnum followed the death, indicating that Arbogast was unprepared to install a new emperor. Gerard Friell suggests that Valentinian killed himself out of humiliation after his authority was devalued by Arbogast on multiple occasions. Thomas Hodgkin leans towards murder, claiming that "Arbogast had much to fear from the prolongation of his master's life, and something to hope from his death," but he also acknowledges that the interregnum shows that Arbogast did not have a plan for what to do after the death of Valentinian. Christopher Bendle suggests that the interregnum itself could be part of the deception, to spare Arbogast from seeming prepared for an allegedly spontaneous event. The truth of the matter remains obscure.

== Arbogast and Eugenius ==
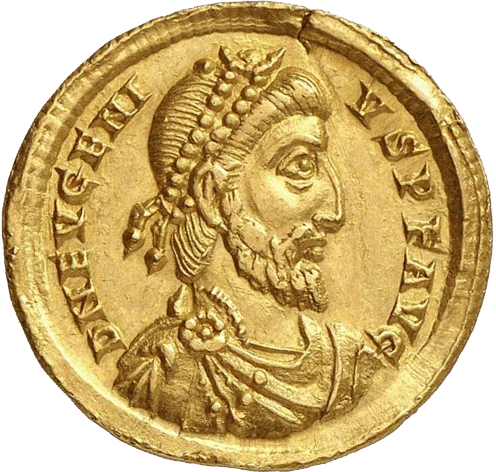
Coin of Eugenius

In August 392, Arbogast nominated Eugenius, a Roman teacher of rhetoric, as the next emperor in the West. Whether or not the rumors surrounding the death of Valentinian II are true, contemporaries initially considered the transfer of power "legitimate, legal, Roman, and civilized". With the new ruler established, in 393 Arbogast travelled across the Rhine frontier to take revenge against his own Franks and their kinglets Sunno and Marcomer, who had plundered the region in the reign of Valentinian. The campaign, which met little opposition, included restoration of the fortress city of Cologne, an important strategic location which allowed the Romans to occupy the Rhine's eastern bank for the last time in their history. Furthermore, Arbogast was able to conclude a peace treaty in which the Franks promised to supply the Roman military with valuable new recruits.

Eugenius was a Christian whose religious position had been approved by Ambrose and Theodosius I, but he was sympathetic to paganism and allowed the reopening of temples closed under Gratian and Valentinian II. Zosimus, among others, suggests that Arbogast chose Eugenius as part of a program of pagan revival. Certainly public pagan worship increased during his reign, although neither he nor Arbogast may have intended for this to be so. It was dangerous to incur the displeasure of Theodosius, who seemed to be preparing his son Honorius, recently promoted to Augustus, to take Eugenius' place. Furthermore, all communication between the Eastern and Western courts was now managed by Rufinus, Theodosius' new praetorian prefect, who could poison the Emperor's mind against Arbogast and Eugenius if he wished.

In order to shore up their legitimacy, Arbogast and Eugenius moved to take control of Italy, a strategic and symbolic center of the Roman world, in April 393. There they engaged in further gestures of goodwill towards the pagan community, appointing the polytheist nobleman Virius Nicomachus Flavianus as Prefect of Italy, and permitting the restoration of the Altar of Victory and other pagan symbols removed by stricter Christian emperors. Reportedly they threatened to turn the basilica at Mediolanum into a stable for their horses. When, in 394, Theodosius decided that Eugenius must be eliminated, he justified the conflict as a holy war. The Eastern and Western forces had a single, decisive engagement, the Battle of the Frigidus.

=== Battle of the Frigidus and death of Arbogast ===
Theodosius set off from Constantinople in the middle of May, reaching Adrianople on 20 June 394. His route to Italy lay through the Julian Alps, and Arbogast and Eugenius moved to intercept him. They made camp in Mediolanum and were joined by Nicomachus Flavianus, who had conducted a haruspicy and obtained a prophecy of victory for their cause. The Western army's original plan called for laying a series of ambushes in the Alps, arranged so as to encircle Theodosius and his troops. Theodosius failed to appear at the expected time, and Arbogast concluded that the enemy had changed course and was trying to outflank him from behind the heavily defended Adriatic coast. He called off the attacks in the mountain passes and dispatched a substantial portion of his forces to the south to meet the supposed assault.

In fact, Theodosius had paused at Sirmium to gather reinforcements. He passed undisturbed through the Alps and reached Arbogast's location in September. The forces of Arbogast and Eugenius entrenched themselves on a flat plain with their backs to the river Frigidus. Additional troops occupied nearby elevated positions, and the men who had been sent south were left in place to defend against outflanking manoeuvres. Battle commenced on 5 September 394 and lasted the entire day. Theodosius, compelled to make a frontal assault, failed to break through Arbogast's lines. Having taken heavy losses, the Eastern army retreated towards the protection of the Julian Alps. Arbogast sent a large force after them, but suffered a humiliating reversal when Theodosius convinced the attackers to switch sides in return for a substantial bribe.

Reinforced by the turncoats from the army of Arbogast and Eugenius, Theodosius was ready to attack them for a second time on the following day. He approached the battlefield on a narrow road, where the now diminished Western army attempted to ambush him. The ambush was thwarted with the help of a local weather phenomenon known as the bora, wherein the pressure effect on cold air passing over the mountains produces cyclonic winds of up to 60 mph. The wind threw dust in the faces of Arbogast and his troops and turned back their projectile weapons, helping Theodosius win a comprehensive victory. Christian writers such as Theodoretus and Saint Augustine say that the Battle of the Frigidus was won through divine intervention, whereas modern scholars instead point out the significance in Theodosius' unprecedentedly large-scale employment of barbarian mercenaries.

Eastern forces overran the enemy camp and captured Eugenius, who was beheaded. Arbogast managed to escape into the Alps, where he wandered alone for a few days. Sometime after 6 September 394, he decided that his position was hopeless and killed himself.

Despite Arbogast's questionable involvement in politics in the latter years of his life, Hodgkin gives a positive overall estimation of his career: "Arbogast, the flame-like Frank, was no mere intriguer like [Magnus] Maximus, but a brave and well-trained soldier, probably the best General in the Roman Empire". Gerard Friell and Stephen Williams concur, summarizing Arbogast as "a first-class military commander with a fine record, very popular with the army and wholly loyal to the houses of Valentinian and Theodosius". Christopher Bendle counters that most of Arbogast's military successes were achieved under the leadership of others, and that the general owed his ascendancy to his gifts for manipulating personal relationships and winning loyalty.

== See also ==
- Battle of the Frigidus
- Valentinian II
- Theodosius I
- Eugenius
- Stilicho
- Magnus Maximus

Preceded by Flavius Bauto	Magister militum 388–394	Succeeded by Stilicho
