= Sulpicius Alexander =

Roman historian of Germanic tribes

Sulpicius Alexander (fl. late fourth century) was a Roman historian of Germanic tribes. His work is lost, but his Historia in at least four books is quoted by Gregory of Tours. It was perhaps a continuation of the Res gestae by Ammianus Marcellinus (which ended in 378 AD) and dealt with events at least until the death of Valentinian II (392 AD). The work of Sulpicius Alexander as extracts in Gregory's Decem Libri Historiarum (II 9) is considered an important source in any discussion of the origin of the Frankish tribes.
