= Battle between the Hermunduri and the Chatti =

58 battle

Battle between the Hermundi and the Chatti
Date	58 AD
Location	Germania
Result	Hermunduri victory

Belligerents
Chatti	Hermunduri

Commanders and leaders
Unknown	Unknown

Strength
Unknown	Unknown

Casualties and losses
All Chatti were slain	Unknown

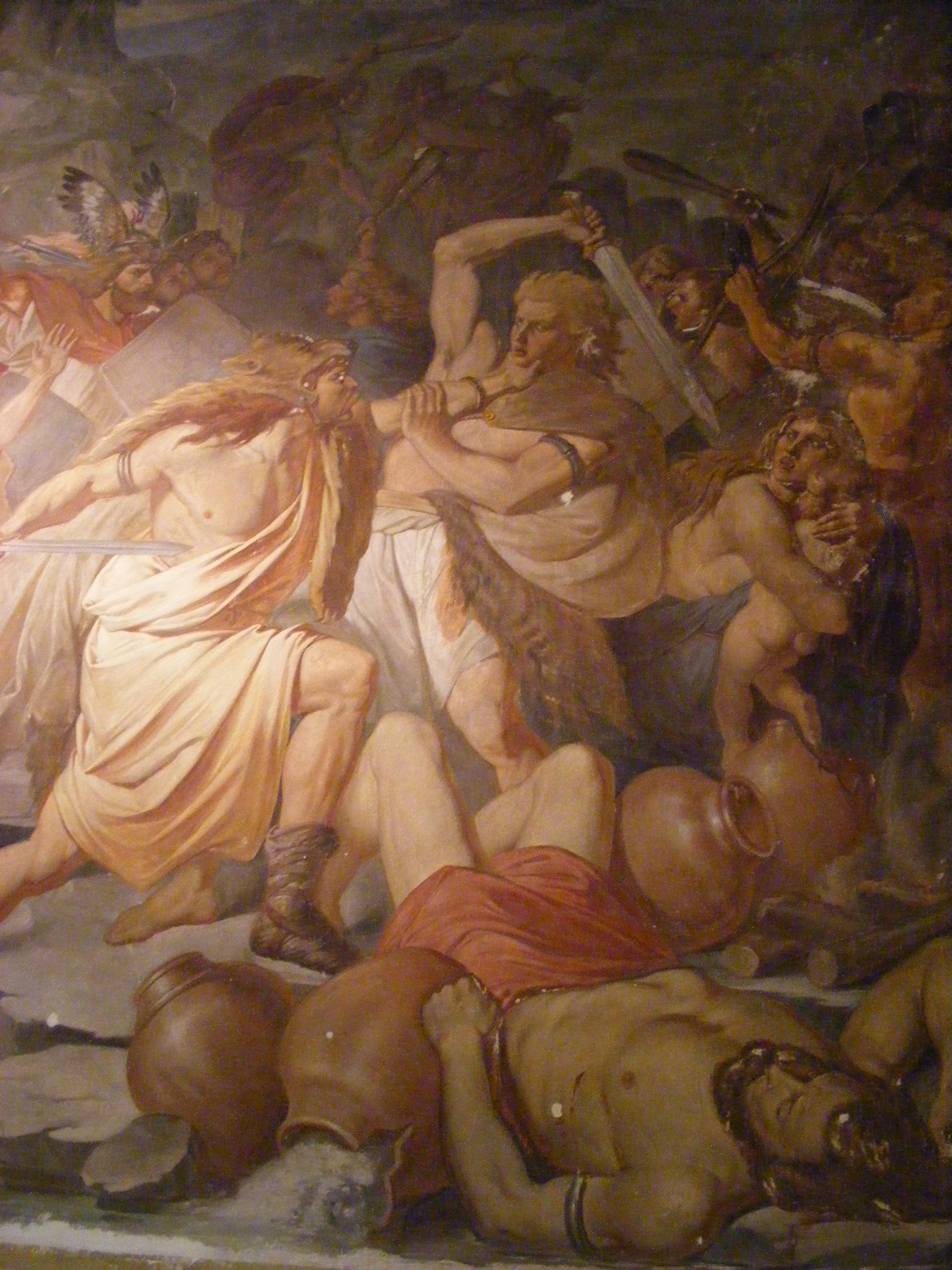
"Kampf der Hermunduren and Katten um die Salzquellen bei Kissingen 58 nach Christo", a 19th century fresco

The Battle between the Hermunduri and the Chatti, popularly known as the Salt Battle (German: Salzschlacht) was fought in Germania in 58 AD between the Chatti and the Hermunduri, both Germanic tribes.

== History ==
It is described in the Annals by the Roman historian Tacitus. The battle was a result of a border dispute between two Germanic tribes, the Chatti and the Hermunduri. Both claimed a river (most likely the Main river), as their own. The river had special religious significance and was also good for the extraction of salt through possession of some salt springs. The battle seem to have been a result of the Marcomanni, who, led by Maroboduus (who had died in 37 A.D.) had left the area vacant and had headed toward Bohemia, in order to avoid being within the range of the Roman influence. The Chatti pushed southward and the Hermunduri attacked northward. The battle, which lasted all summer of 58 A.D., resulted in a victory to the Hermunduri and all the Chatti were slain.

== Sources ==
- Tacitus. The Annals
