= Armalausi =

Germanic tribe

The Armalausi (or Armilausini) were an obscure Germanic tribe of late antiquity. Their name means "those who wear the armilausa", a type of shirt open at the front and back but connected at the shoulders.

They are known from four geographical and administrative texts. As Armalausi they appear between the Alamanni and the Marcomanni on the Tabula Peutingeriana world map (3rd or 4th century AD). As Armilausini, they are listed between the Burgundians and Marcomanni in the Cosmographia of Julius Honorius (pre-6th century) and between the Juthungi and Marcomanni in the Verona list (early 4th century). Under the corrupted spelling Armolaos they are mentioned in the Cosmographia Aethici (7th or 8th century). Some later manuscripts of Honorius give the corrupted spellings Armilauzini and Amilaismi.

They may have been a tribe of the Hermunduri. Philippus Brietius (1650) places them in the Upper Palatinate. They appear to have crossed the Danube and replaced the Varisci in the 2nd or 3rd century, and they probably merged with the Alamanni in the course of the 4th century.

== See also ==
- List of Germanic peoples
