= Vibilius =

1st century AD King of the Hermunduri

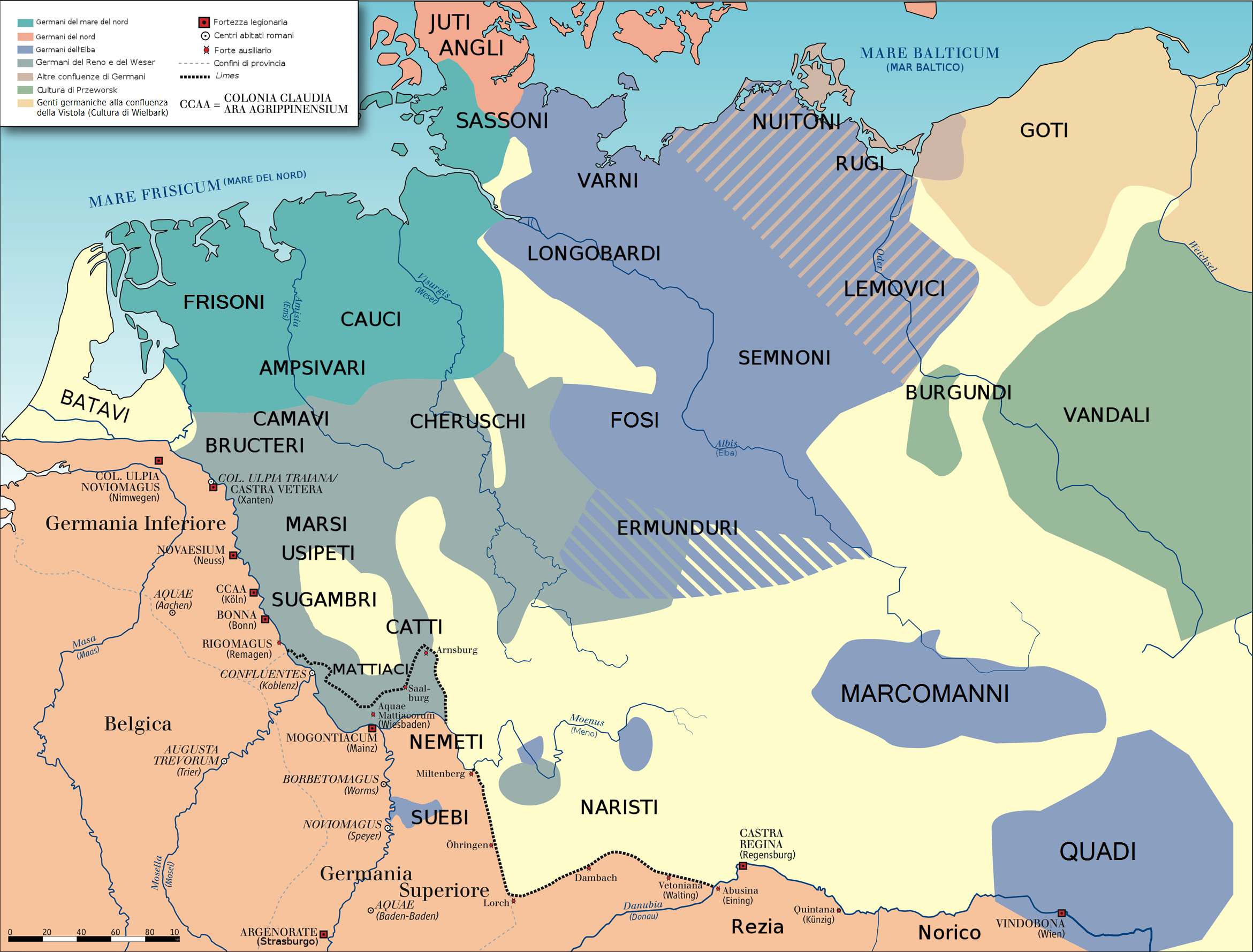
A map representing the Germanan AD

Vibilius or Vibillius (flourished in 1st century AD) was a powerful king of the Hermunduri in the 1st century AD, mentioned in The Annals of the Roman historian Tacitus. According to Tacitus, Vibilius deposed the Marcomannic king Catualda, who had himself deposed Maroboduus in 18 AD. Catualda was subsequently succeeded by the Quadian client king Vannius. In 50 AD however, along with Vannius' nephews Vangio and Sido and allied Lugii, Vibilius also in turn led the deposition of Vannius.

== Sources ==
- Tacitus, The Annals
