= Maroboduus =

Early 1st century AD king of the Marcomanni

Maroboduus (d. AD 37), also known as Marbod, was a king of the Marcomanni, who were a Germanic Suebian people. He spent part of his youth in Rome, and returning, found his people under pressure from invasions by the Roman Empire between the Rhine and Elbe. He led them into the forests of Bohemia, near to the Quadi who already lived nearby, and established a large alliance. He is both the earliest recorded ruler of the territory of modern-day Czech Republic, as well as its earliest known inhabitant.

== Name ==
The name appears in Latin and Greek texts spelt variously: Maroboduus, Marobodus, Maraboduus, Meroboduus, Morobuduus, Moroboduus, Marbodus and Marabodus in Latin sources; Maroboudos and Baroboudos in Greek ones.

According to linguist Xavier Delamarre, the personal name Maroboduus is a latinized form of Gaulish Maro-boduos, from maro- ('great') attached to boduos ('crow'; cf. Middle Irish bodb 'scald-crow, war-divinity', Old Breton bodou 'ardea'; also Common Brittonic Boduoci (Boudica)). The Celtic personal names Boduus, Teuto-boduus (Teutobod), Ate-boduus, Soli-boduus, Boduo-genus, and Buduo-gnatus are related. Philologist John T. Koch argues that Middle Irish bodb must be understood as the 'bird on the battlefield and manifestation of the war-goddess'.

The second element of the name, boduos, is a term shared by Celtic and Germanic languages, where it is found as the common noun *badwō ('battle'; cf. ON bǫð, OE beado, OS badu-, OHG batu-) and in the name of the war goddess Baduhenna. The original meaning of Celtic–Germanic *b^{h}od^{h}wo- must have been 'battle, fight', later metaphorised in Celtic as 'crow', a bird symbolizing the carnage in battle.

== Biography ==
Maroboduus was born into a noble family of the Marcomanni. As a young man, he lived in Italy and was reportedly regarded well by the Emperor Augustus.

In 10 BC, the Marcomanni reportedly suffered a significant defeat at the hands of the Roman Empire. Afterwards, in about 9 BC, Maroboduus returned to Germania and became ruler of his people. To deal with the threat of Roman expansion into the Rhine-Danube basin, he led the Marcomanni to the area later known as Bohemia to be outside the range of the Roman influence. There, he took the title of king and organized a confederation of several neighboring Germanic tribes. He was the first documented ruler of Bohemia with a government.

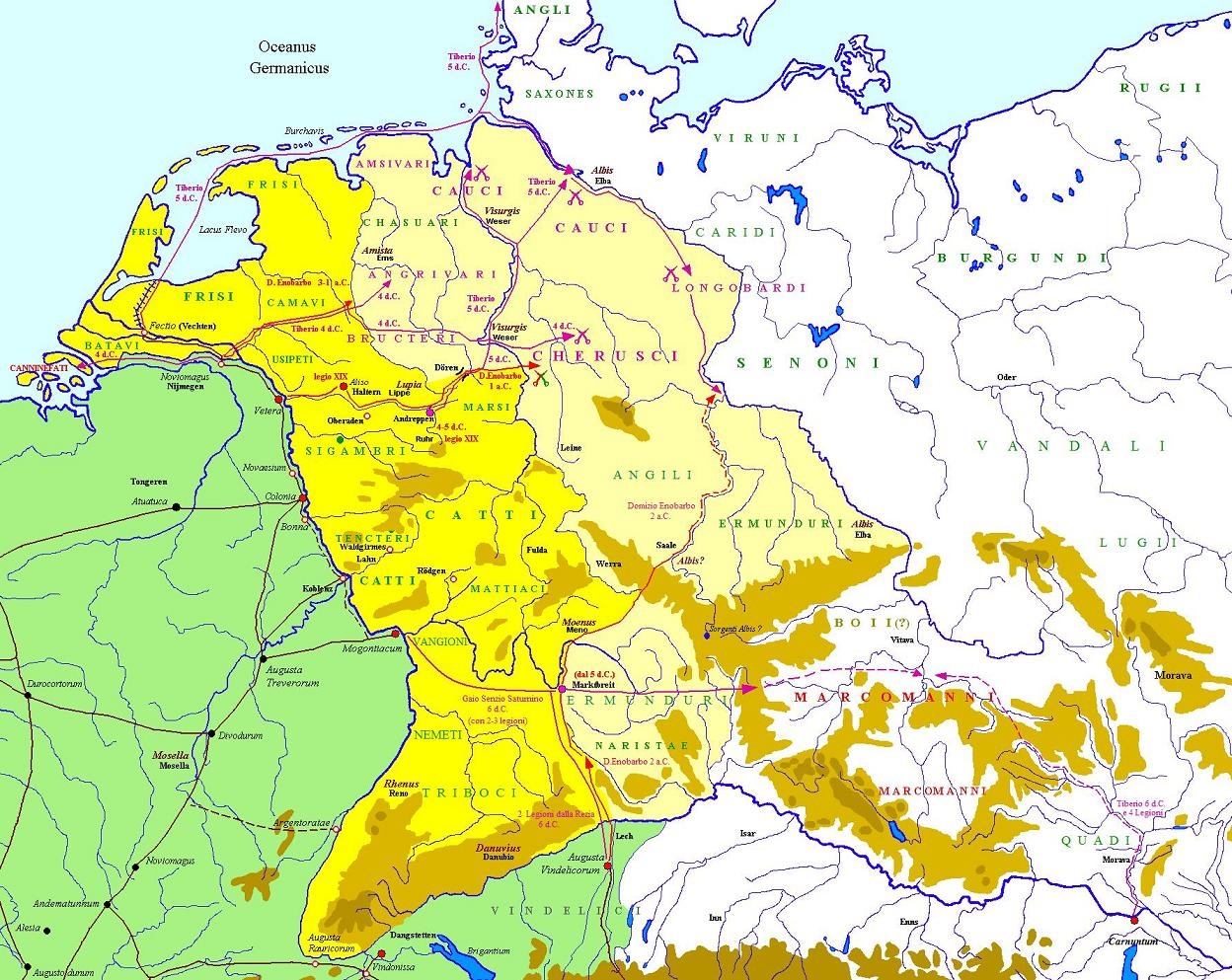
Campaign of Tiberius and Saturninus against Marobudus in 6 AD

Augustus planned in 6 AD to destroy the kingdom of Maroboduus, which he considered to be too dangerous for the Romans. The future emperor Tiberius commanded 12 legions to attack the Marcomanni, but the outbreak of a revolt in Illyria, and the need for troops there, forced Tiberius to conclude a treaty with Maroboduus and to recognize him as king.

== War with Arminius and death ==
His rivalry with Arminius, the Cheruscan leader who inflicted the devastating defeat at the Battle of the Teutoburg Forest on the Romans under Publius Quinctilius Varus in 9 AD, prevented a concerted attack on Roman territory across the Rhine in the north (by Arminius) and in the Danube basin in the south (by Maroboduus).

However, according to the first-century AD historian Marcus Velleius Paterculus, Arminius sent Varus's head to Maroboduus, but the king of the Marcomanni sent it to Augustus. In the revenge war of Tiberius and Germanicus against the Cherusci, in 16 AD, Maroboduus stayed neutral.

In 17 AD, war broke out between Arminius and Maroboduus, and after an indecisive battle, Maroboduus withdrew into the hilly forests of Bohemia in 18 AD. In the next year, Catualda, a young Marcomannic nobleman living in exile among the Gutones, returned, perhaps by a subversive Roman intervention, and defeated Maroboduus. The deposed king had to flee to Italy, and Tiberius detained him for 18 years in Ravenna. There, Maroboduus died in 37 AD. Catualda was, in turn, defeated by the Hermunduri Vibilius, after which the realm was ruled by the Quadian Vannius. Vannius was himself also deposed by Vibilius, in coordination with his nephews Vangio and Sido, who then ruled as Roman client kings.
