= Malorix and Verritus =

Germanic chiefs

They exclaimed that no men on earth surpassed the Germans in arms or in loyalty. Then they went down and took their seat among the senators.

— Tacitus, The Annals.13.54

Malorix and Verritus were chieftains of the Germanic Frisii in the 1st-century AD.

In 58 AD, they requested Roman emperor Nero to cede territory to the Frisii. Concurrently, Malorix and Verritus displayed their confidence by sitting down with their entourage at the Theatre of Pompey along with the Roman senators, without receiving permission to do so. They were granted Roman citizenship by Nero, but Frisian territory was ceded to Rome's allies.

== See also ==
- Vangio and Sido
