= Hermunduri =

Germanic tribe, who lived near the Danube and Elbe rivers (first to third centuries AD)

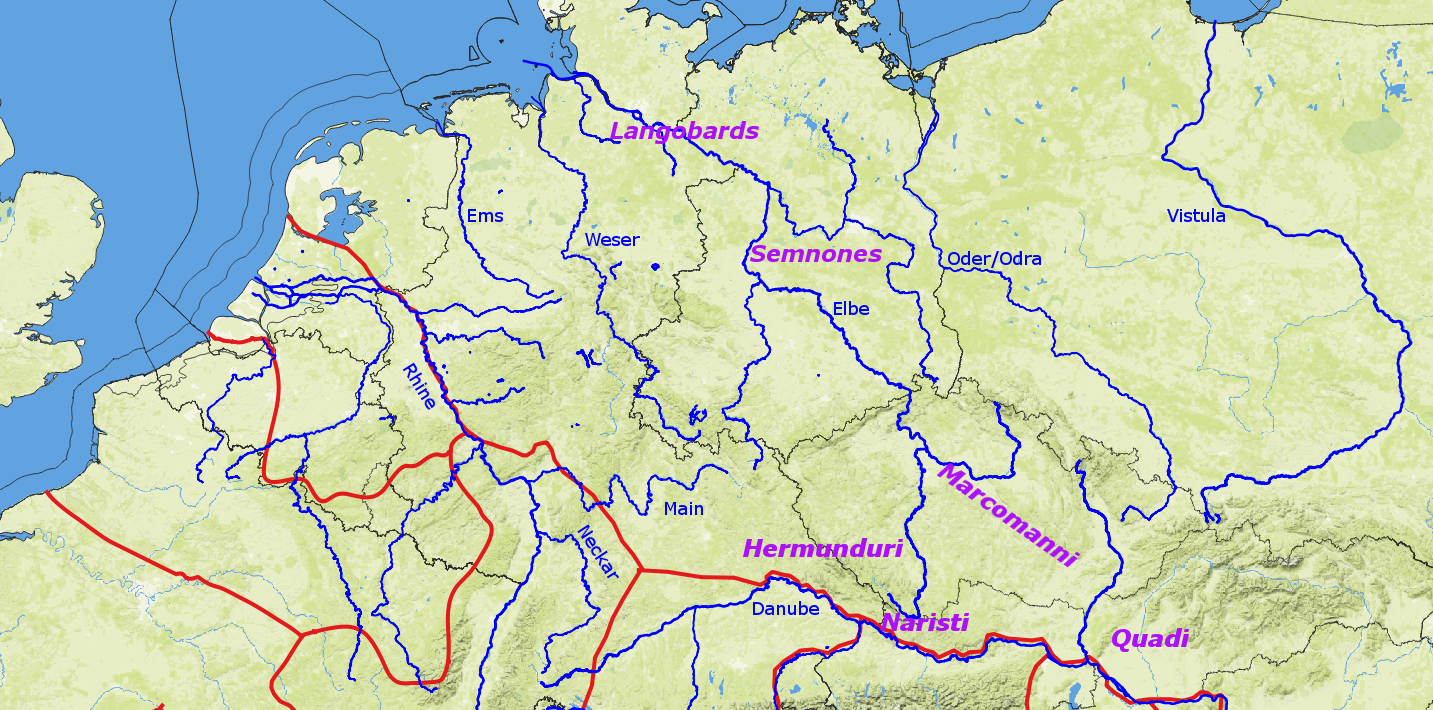
Approximate positions of some major Suebi peoples in the early 2nd century, in purple

The Hermunduri or Ermonduri were a Roman-era Germanic people, who are known from written records between 7 BC and the fourth century.

The region or regions where they lived are somewhat unclear, and they were described as mobile in some periods. However, it appears that they lived in or near present day Bavaria and the Czech Republic.

Based on the perceived similarity of their names, they have been speculatively associated by some scholars with the later Thuringi who lived further north from the fifth century. Recent linguistic scholarship has however been critical of this hypothesis.

== Name ==
Spelling variants of the name leave it unclear whether the initial "h" was pronounced. It has been proposed by philologist Günter Neumann that there was no "h" in the original pronunciation. However, Springer has argued that the evidence is insufficient.

Neumann argues, in line with older scholarship, that the first part of the name represents a Germanic adjectival stem ermin which denoted extraordinary or superhuman greatness. Springer, in contrast argues that the name Hermunduri is probably a name that looks like a Germanic word but is not one.

In much of 19th and 20th century scholarship it was assumed that the remnants of the Hermunduri went on to become the medieval Thuringii. Various proposals were made to connect the second part of the name (-duri), with the (Thuri) in the Thuringian name. In more recent scholarship this has been argued against by scholars such as Matthias Springer. The problem is that a Germanic d-sound would not have evolved to a Germanic th-sound. Neumann argued that the two names could come from the same root if (H)ermun-dur- evolved separately as an old compound word which underwent Verner's law, which did not operate on initial consonants. Springer points out that if both names were so old then this would only be evidence of names with the same pre-Germanic etymological root.

The last part of the name of the Thuringi is the Germanic suffix -ing, which can refer to descendants. It was therefore suggested that it meant "descendants of the Duri".

Another tribal name sometimes associated with the Hermunduri or Thuringii because the name is superficially similar are the Teuriochaemae mentioned only once in passing in the second-century geography of Claudius Ptolemy.

== History ==
In about 3 BC, Cassius Dio, writing centuries later using unknown sources, reported that "while he was still administering the regions along the Danube" Lucius Domitius Ahenobarbus, "had taken under his protection the Hermunduri, who had left their homeland for an unknown reason and were wandering in search of new land". He then settled them "in part of the Marcomannic territory". The text implies that Ahenobarbus held an office administering a region along the Danube, and scholars generally understand this to have been a governorship of Roman Illyricum. There is no consensus about where the "Marcomannic territory" was but as the Marcomanni themselves had moved after their defeat by Drusus the Elder in 9 BC there are two main areas proposed. One is the original homeland of the Marcomanni, which scholars think may have been near the River Main in Franconia, and the other proposal is that the Hermunduri were given land near Bohemia, where the Marcomanni had subsequently settled.

Strabo, writing in about 20 AD, treats the "Hermondori" as a nomadic Suebian people, now living east of the Elbe, apparently having been forced over the river by the Romans.

Now as for the tribe of the Suevi, it is the largest, for it extends from the Rhenus [Rhine] to the Albis [Elbe]; and a part of them even dwell on the far side of the Albis [Elbe river], as, for instance, the Hermondori and the Langobardi; and at the present time these latter, at least, have, to the last man, been driven in flight out of their country into the land on the far side of the river. It is a common characteristic of all the peoples in this part of the world4 that they migrate with ease, because of the meagreness of their livelihood and because they do not till the soil or even store up food, but live in small huts that are merely temporary structures; and they live for the most part off their flocks, as the Nomads do,

A contemporary of Strabo, Velleius Paterculus, also apparently described their position on the eastern banks of the Elbe:

The power of the Langobardi was broken, a race surpassing even the Germans in savagery; and finally — and this is something which had never before been entertained even as a hope, much less actually attempted — a Roman army with its standards was led four hundred miles beyond the Rhine as far as the river Elbe, which flows past the territories of the Semnones and the Hermunduri.

Mattias Springer has pointed out that the surviving Latin text actually refers to the "Hermundorum", implying that the people being referred to were called the "Hermundi". The 16th century scholar Beatus Rhenanus corrected the text to Hermundurorum, but he could have also corrected to Hermunonum, which would mean the text referring to the Irminones. This was a larger grouping of Germanic peoples which included the Hermunduri, Chatti, Cherusci, and Suebi, according to Pliny the Elder.

In about 19 AD Tacitus recounted in his Annals that the Hermundurian Vibilius led the overthrow of the Marcomannic king Catualda in favour of the Quadian Vannius.

Around 50 AD, Vibilius deposed Vannius with the help of Vannius' own nephews Vangio and Sido, and the Lugii. It is not certain that this was the same Vibilius, but the events probably took place in what is now Moravia and Slovakia, and certainly near Roman Pannonia, because the governor of that province was involved in the events.

Under 57 AD Tacitus reported that the Hermunduri defeated the Chatti in a border dispute over a religiously significant river with salt reserves near it. The Hermunduri won this conflict. The location of this river is now uncertain. It was possibly the Werra or the Saxon Saale.

Around 70 AD, Pliny the elder in his Historia Naturalis, listed the Hermunduri as one of the nations of the Hermiones, who claimed to share a common ancestor along with the Chatti, Cherusci, and Suebi.

Around 100 AD, Tacitus described the Hermunduri in his Germania, listing them first among the Suebi that live "closer to us" (the Romans), along the northern side of the Danube. Their territory included the source of the Elbe, by which he may have meant the Vltava, in what is now the Czech Republic. It stretched to the southwest as far as the border of Roman Raetia on the Danube in what now in northern Bavaria. To their east, next going downstream, were the Naristi (or Varisti).

Nearer to us is the state of the Hermunduri (I shall follow the course of the Danube as I did before that of the Rhine), a people loyal to Rome. Consequently they, alone of the Germans, trade not merely on the banks of the river, but far inland, and in the most flourishing colony of the province of Raetia. Everywhere they are allowed to pass without a guard; and while to the other tribes we display only our arms and our camps, to them we have thrown open our houses and country-seats, which they do not covet. It is in their lands that the Elbe takes its rise, a famous river known to us in past days; now we only hear of it.

When Marcus Aurelius died in 180 AD, he was involved in Marcomannic Wars. According to the often unreliable source known as the Historia Augusta, the Hermunduri were within the alliance of the Marcomanni, the Sarmatians, and the Quadi, which was opposed to Rome.

In the Laterculus Veronensis the "Hermundubi" appear in the list barbarian peoples who prospered during the Roman Crisis of the third century. They are listed between the Taifali and Vandals, who both lived in the area of what had been Dacia at this time, in what is now Romania.

In the time of Constantine the Great, who reigned 306-337, the 6th century writer Jordanes reported that the Hasdingi Vandals were living in the land later inhabited by the Gepids, where they were surrounded "on the east [by] the Goths, on the west [by] the Marcomanni, on the north [by] the "Hermunduli" and on the south [by] the Hister (Danube)". He also explained that the land of the Gepids had once been Dacia. According to Springer, the remark is confused but suggests a location in southeastern Europe.

== Kings of the Hermunduri ==
- Vibilius, c. 18 - c. 50

== See also ==
- Armalausi
- Alamanni
- The Collection of Pre- and Protohistoric Artifacts at the University of Jena

== Sources ==
- Neumann, Günter (1989), "Ermunduri", in Beck, Heinrich; Geuenich, Dieter; Steuer, Heiko (eds.), Reallexikon der Germanischen Altertumskunde, vol. 7 (2 ed.), De Gruyter, pp. 517–518, ISBN 978-3-11-011445-4
- Springer, Matthias (2009), "Zwischen (H)Ermunduren und Thüringern besteht kein Zusammenhang", in Castritius, Helmut; Geuenich, Dieter; Werner, Matthias (eds.), Die Frühzeit der Thüringer, Reallexikon der Germanischen Altertumskunde - Ergänzungsbände, vol. 63, De Gruyter, pp. 135–169, ISBN 978-3-11-021454-3
- Liccardo, Salvatore (2023), Old Names, New Peoples: Listing Ethnonyms in Late Antiquity, Brill, doi:10.1163/9789004686601
