= Protohistory =

Period between prehistory and written history

Protohistory is the period between prehistory and written history, during which a culture or civilization has not yet developed writing, but other cultures that have developed writing have noted the existence of those pre-literate groups in their own writings.

Protohistoric may also refer to the transition period between the advent of literacy in a society and the writings of the first historians. The preservation of oral traditions may complicate matters, as they can provide a secondary historical source for even earlier events. Colonial sites involving a literate group and a nonliterate group are also studied as protohistoric situations.

The term can also refer to a period in which fragmentary or external historical documents, not necessarily including a developed writing system, have been found. For instance, the Proto–Three Kingdoms of Korea, the Yayoi, recorded by the Chinese, and the Mississippian groups, recorded by early European explorers, are protohistoric.

== Use of term ==
In The Oxford Illustrated History of Prehistoric Europe, an article by archaeologist Timothy Taylor states,

Because of the existence in some but not all societies of historical writing during the first millennium BC, the period has often been termed 'protohistoric' instead of prehistoric. Of course, the understanding of the past gained through archaeology is broadly different in nature to understanding derived from historical texts. Having both sorts of evidence is a boon and a challenge.

— Timothy Taylor, The Oxford Illustrated Prehistory of Europe

For other examples, see also the writings of Brian M. Fagan on the protohistory of North America, and the work of Muhammed Abdul Nayeem on that of the Arabian Peninsula.

== Chronology ==
As with prehistory, determining when a culture may be considered prehistoric or protohistoric is sometimes difficult for anthropologists. Data varies considerably from culture to culture, region to region, and even from one system of reckoning dates to another.

In its simplest form, protohistory follows the same chronology as prehistory and is based on the technological advancement of a particular people with regard to metallurgy:

- Copper Age, or Chalcolithic
- The Bronze Age
- The Iron Age

== Civilizations and peoples ==
The best-known protohistoric civilizations and ethnic groups are those for whom the term was originally coined: the barbarian tribes mentioned by European and Asian writers. Many protohistoric peoples also feature in prehistory and in history:

- Alans
- Balts
- Bulgars
- Celts
- Dacians
- Erie
- Gauls
- Germanic peoples
- Huns
- Kofun
- Magyars
- Mosopelea
- Numidians
- Parthians
- Sarmatians
- Scythians
- Slavs
- Susquehannock
- Timucua
- Thracians
- Proto–Three Kingdoms of Korea
- Yamatai (Japan)
- Yarlung dynasty (Tibet)

== See also ==
- Ancient history
- Meluhha – Prominent trading partner of Sumer during the Middle Bronze Age, recorded in Sumerian records, possibly identical with the Indus civilisation
- The Collection of Pre- and Protohistoric Artifacts at the University of Jena
