= Vangio and Sido =

Co-rulers of a Roman client kingdom in Bohemia in the 1st century AD

Vangio and Sido (flourished in 1st century AD) were two Quadian brothers who were the co-rulers of a Roman client kingdom in Bohemia in the 1st century AD.

According to The Annals of Tacitus, Vangio and Sido were the sons of a sister of Vannius, who since defeating the Marcomannic king Catualda in 18 AD had ruled the Kingdom of Vannius (regnum Vannianum). Tacitus writes their uncle was "renowned and popular with his countrymen," but after a long reign, he "became a tyrant, and the enmity of neighbours, joined to intestine strife, was his ruin." Around 50 AD, assisted by the Hermunduri king Vibilius, Vangio and Sido led the deposition of Vannius. Emperor Claudius, decided to stay out of the conflict, fearing that the Lugii and other Germanic tribes would be attracted by the "opulent realm which Vannius had enriched during thirty years of plunder and tribute."

Vangio and Sido easily overthrew Vannius, after which the realm was subsequently divided between them. Tacitus writes that Vangio and Sido were "admirably loyal" to the Romans, but among their subjects, by whom they were "much loved" while seeking to acquire power, they became "yet more hated when they acquired it."

== See also ==
- Malorix and Verritus

== Sources ==
- Tacitus, The Annals
