= Laterculus Veronensis =

Manuscript

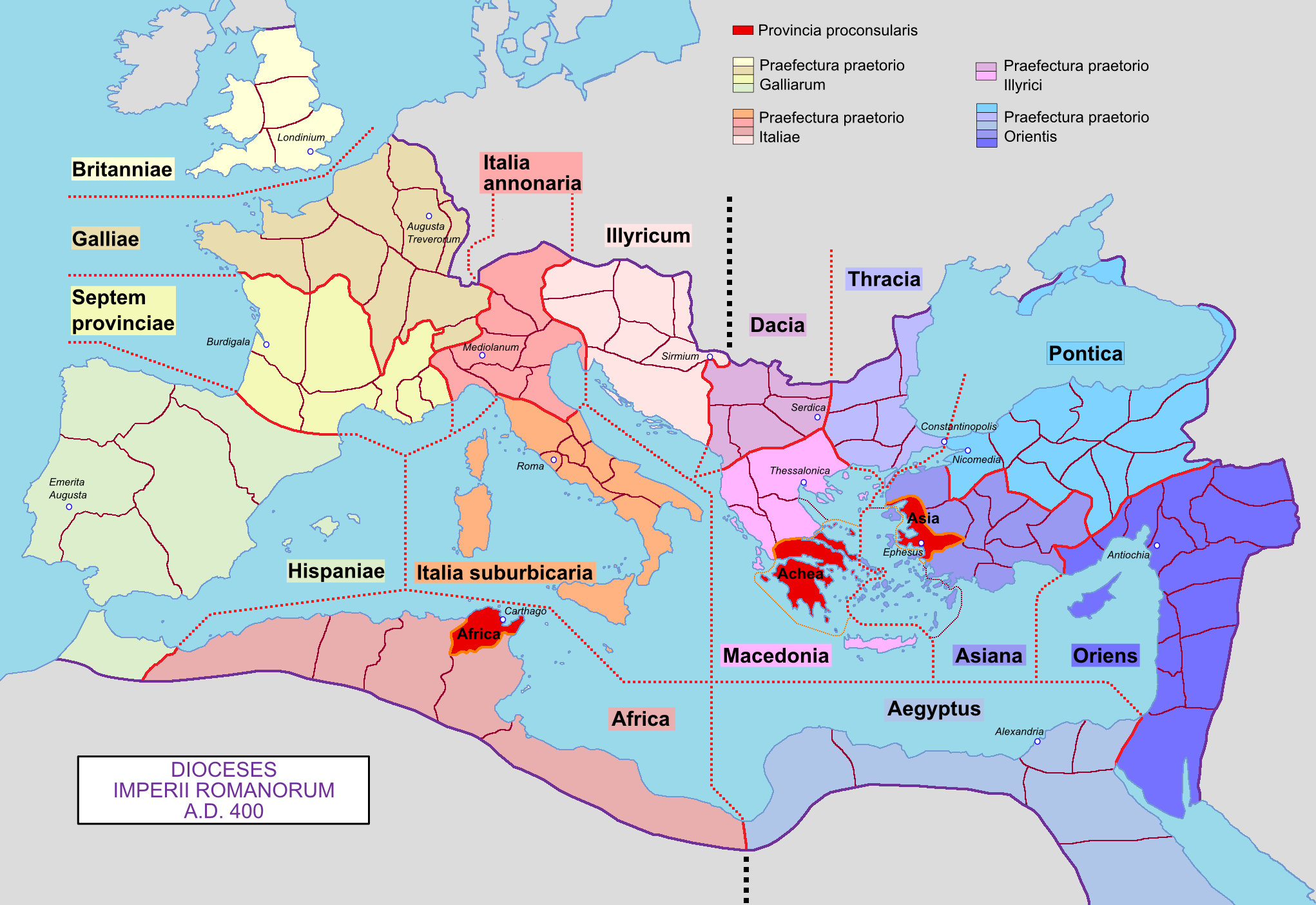

The Laterculus Veronensis or Verona List is a list of Roman provinces and barbarian peoples from the time of the emperors Diocletian and Constantine I, most likely from AD 314.

The list is transmitted only in a 7th-century manuscript preserved in the Chapter Library of Verona. The most recent critical edition is that of Timothy Barnes (1982). Earlier editions include those by Theodor Mommsen (1862), Otto Seeck in his edition of the Notitia dignitatum (1876), and Alexander Riese in his Geographi Latini minores (1878).

The Laterculus is the earliest text to use the term Scoti (Scots).

== Description ==
The document comprises a list of the names of all the provinces of the empire (c. 100 in total), organised according to the twelve newly created regional groupings called dioceses. Although the dioceses are presented in a single list, they are not ordered in a single geographical sequence but rather in two separate eastern and western groups, the eastern group (Oriens, Pontica, Asiana, Thraciae, Moesiae, Pannoniae) preceding the western (Britanniae, Galliae, Viennensis, Italiae, Hispaniae, Africa). The split is apparent from the discontinuity midway in the list between the dioceses of Pannoniae and Britanniae. The eastern half of the list circles the Mediterranean neatly anticlockwise from south to north or, in continental terms, from Africa, through Asia, to Europe. The arrangement of the western half is less tidy, though it is approximately anticlockwise from north to south, or from Europe to Africa.

The barbarian peoples listed may in some instance have lived outside of the provincial structure of the empire, but they are all clearly regarded as living within the empire. Even in the cases of those barbarians clearly living within provinces, however, the Laterculus suggests that a meaningful distinction was drawn between "civilized" and "uncivilized" areas.

== Date ==
Theodor Mommsen had dated the provincial situation in the list to 297, but later research changed the estimate to 314–324 for the Eastern Half and 303–314 for the Western Half of the Roman empire. The most recent work by Timothy Barnes and Constantin Zuckerman concludes that the entire document belongs to a single moment, c. 314, the eastern and western parts corresponding to the respective spheres of responsibility of the emperors Licinius and Constantine during the period between Licinius' defeat of Maximinus Daza in 313 and his own defeat in his first civil war with Constantine in 316–317.

== Text ==
The text on the left is the original Latin, divided into lines beginning with capital letters. The original text uses the interpunct (·) to separate entries and is mostly unicase. The text on the right is an English translation.

Latin original

Incipit eiusdem nomina prouinciarum omnium.

Diocensis Orientis habet prouincias numero XVIII

Libia superior
Libia inferior
Thebais
Aegyptus iouia
Aegyptus herculea
Arabia
item Arabia
Augusta libanensis
Palestina
Fenicen
Syria ecohele
Augusta eupatenses
Cilicia
Isauria
Tupus
Mesopotamia
Osroaena

Diocensis Pontica habet prouincias numero VII

Bitinia
Cappadocia
Galatia
Pamplagonia, nunc in duas diuisa
Diospontus
Pontus polemiacus
Armenia minor, nunc et maior addita

Diocensis Asiana habet prouincias numero VIIII

Phanfilia
Frigia prima
Frigia secunda
Assa
Lidia
Caria
Insuluae
Fisidae
Ellespontus

Diocensis Tracoae habet prouincias numero VI

Europa
Rodope
Tracia
Emossanus
Scitia
Misia inferior

Diocensis Misiarum habet prouincias numero XI

Dacias
Misia superior margensis
Dardania
Macedonia
Tessalia
Priantina
Priualentina
Epiros noua
Epiros uetus
Creta

Diocensis Pannoniarum habet prouincias numero VII

Pannonia inferior
Fauensis
Dalmatia
Ualeria
Pannonia superior
Noricus pariensis
Noricus mediterranea

Diocensis Brittaniarum habet prouincias numero VI

Primam
Secundam
Maxime caesariensis
Aelauiae caesariensis

Diocensis Galliarum habet prouincias numero VIII

Betica prima
Betica secunda
Germania prima
Germania secunda
Sequania
Lubdunensis prima
Lubdunensis secunda
Alpes graiae et poeninae

Diocensis Biennensis habet prouincias numero VII

Biennensis
Narbonensis prima
Narbonensis secunda
Nouem populi
Aquitanica prima
Aquitanica secunda
Alpes maritimas

Diocensis Italiciana habet prouincias numero XVI

Beteiam histriam
Flaminiam picenum
Tusciam umbrenam
Apuliam calabriam
Licaoniam
Corsicam
Alpes cotias
Retica

Diocensis Hispaniarum habet prouincias numero VI

Beticam
Lusitaniam
Kartaginiensis
Gallecia
Tharraconensis
Mauritania tingitania

Diocensis Africae habet prouincias numero VII

Proconsularis
Bizacina
Zeugitana
Numidia cirtensis
Numidia miliciana
Mauritania caesariensis
Mauritania tabia insidiana

Felix saeculum.

Gentes barbarae, quae pullulauerunt sub imperatoribus

Scoti
Picti
Calidoni
Rugi
Heruli
Saxones
Camari
Crinsiani
Amsiuari
Angri angriuari
Fleui
Bructeri
Cati
Burgunziones
Alamanni
Sueui
Franci
Gallouari
Iotungi
Armilausini
Marcomanni
Quadi
Taifruli
Hermundubi
Uandali
Sarmatae
Sciri
Carpi
Scitae
Gothi
Indii
Armeni
Horro [ ]
Palmoerni
Mosoritae
Marmeritae
Theui
Isaur [ ]
Friges
Persae

Item gentes, quae in Mauretaniae sunt

Mauri gensani
Mauri mazazeses
Mauri baueres
Mauri bacautes
Celtitibari
Turini
Ausitani
Calpitani
Cantabri
Enantes

Nomina ciuitatum, trans Renum fluuium quae sunt

Usiphorum [Usipiorum]
Tuuanium [Tubantum]
Nictrensium
Nouarii
Casuariorum [Chasuariorum]

Istae omnes ciuitates trans Renum in formulam Belgicae primae redactae. Trans castellum Montiacesenam LXXX leugas trans Renum Romani possederunt. Istae ciuitates sub Gallieno imperatore a barbaris occupatae sunt. Leuga una habet mille quingentos passus. Explicit.

English translation

Here begins the names of all the provinces.

The diocese of the East has 18 provinces [only 17 listed]:

Libya Superior
Libya Inferior
Thebais
Aegyptus Iovia
Aegyptus Herculea
Arabia Nova
Arabia
Augusta Libanensis
Syria Palaestina
Phoenice
Syria Coele
Augusta Euphratensis
Cilicia
Isauria
Cyprus
Mesopotamia
Osroene

The diocese of Pontus has 7 provinces:

Bithynia
Cappadocia
Galatia
Paphlagonia, now [after 384] divided in two
Diospontus
Pontus Polemoniacus
Armenia Minor, now [after 381] with Armenia Major added

The diocese of Asia has 9 provinces:

Lycia et Pamphylia
Phrygia Prima
Phrygia Secunda
Asia
Lydia
Caria
the Islands
Pisidia
Hellespontus

The diocese of Thrace has 6 provinces:

Europa
Rhodope
Thracia
Haemimontus
Scythia
Moesia Inferior

The diocese of the Moesias has 11 provinces:

Dacia and Dacia Ripensis
Moesia Superior
Dardania
Macedonia
Thessalia
Achaea
Praevalitana
Epirus Nova
Epirus Vetus
Creta

The diocese of the Pannonias has 7 provinces:

Pannonia Inferior
Savensis
Dalmatia
Valeria
Pannonia Superior
Noricum Ripense
Noricum Mediterraneum

The diocese of the Britains has 6 provinces [only 4 listed]:

Britannia Prima
Britannia Secunda
Maxima Caesariensis
Flavia Caesariensis

The diocese of the Gauls has 8 provinces:

Belgica Prima
Belgica Secunda
Germania Prima
Germania Secunda
Sequania
Lugdunensis Prima
Lugdunensis Secunda
Alpes Graiae et Poeninae

The diocese of Viennensis has 7 provinces:

Viennensis
Narbonensis Prima
Narbonensis Secunda
Novem Populi
Aquitanica Prima
Aquitanica Secunda
Alpes Maritimae

The Italian diocese has 16 provinces [only 8 listed]:

Venetia et Histria
Flaminia et Picenum
Tuscia et Umbria
Apulia et Calabria
Lucania et Bruttii
Corsica
Alpes Cottiae
Raetia

The diocese of the Spains has 6 provinces:

Baetica
Lusitania
Carthaginiensis
Gallaecia
Tarraconensis
Mauretania Tingitana

The diocese of Africa has 7 provinces:

Africa Proconsularis
Valeria Byzacena
Tripolitana
Numidia Cirtensis
Numidia Militiana
Mauretania Caesariensis
Mauretania Sitifensis

A happy age.

Barbarian peoples who grew under the dominion of the emperors:

Scoti
Picti
Caledonii
Rugii
Heruli
Saxones
Chamavi
?Frisiavi
Amsivarii
Angrivarii
?
Bructeri
Chatti
Burgundiones
Alamanni
Suebi
Franci
Chattuarii
Iuthungi
Armilausini
Marcomanni
Quadi
Taifali
Hermunduri
Vandali
Sarmatae
Sciri
Carpi
Scythae
Gothi
?Venedi
Armenii
Osrhoeni
Palmyreni
?
Marmeridae
?Nabataeans
Isauri
Phryges
Persae

The peoples that are in Mauretania:

Quinquegentiani
Mazices
Barbares
Bacuates
Celtiberi
?Astures/?Turdetani
Ausetani
Carpetani
Cantabri
Edetani

The names of cities that are across the river Rhine:

[city] of the Usipetes
[city] of the Tubantes
[city] of the ?Tencteri
[city] of the ?Novantae
[city] of the Chasuarii

All these cities across the Rhine were received into the rule of Belgica Prima. Across from the fortress of Mogontiacum, the Romans possessed 80 leagues beyond the Rhine. These cities were occupied by barbarians under the emperor Gallienus. One league has one thousand five hundred paces [i.e., 1.5 Roman miles]. Explicit.
