= Catualda =

1st century AD King of the Marcomanni

Catualda (flourished in 1st century AD) was a Marcomannic exile who deposed the Marcomannic king Maroboduus in 18 AD.

Catualda is mentioned in The Annals of the Roman historian Tacitus. Following the Battle of the Teutoburg Forest, while Germanicus was avenging Rome beyond the Rhine, Drusus attempted to divide and conquer the tribes within the vast realm of the Marcomannic ruler Maroboduus. Drusus established relations with Catualda, a young Marcomannic noble living in exile among the Gutones. After the weakening of Maroboduus following the previous invasion of Bohemia by Arminius, Catualda returned with a "strong force" in 18 AD, and having "corruptly won over the nobles", entered the palace and deposed Maroboduus. In an adjacent fortress, Catualda "found the long-accumulated plunder of the Suevi and camp followers and traders from our provinces who had been attracted to an enemy's land, each from their various homes, first by the freedom of commerce, next by the desire of amassing wealth, finally by forgetfulness of their fatherland."

Catualda was however soon defeated by the "overwhelming strength" of Vibilius of the Hermunduri, and was like Maroboduus, forced to seek refuge in the Roman Empire. He was thus settled in Forum Julii (Fréjus) in Gallia Narbonensis. The Marcomanni were subsequently ruled by the Quadian client king Vannius, who was himself also deposed by Vibilius in coordination with own nephews.

== Primary Sources ==
- Tacitus, The Annals

== Secondary Sources ==
- Wolfram, Herwig (1990). The Roman Empire and its Germanic peoples. University of California Press. p. 41. ISBN 0-5200-6983-8.
