= The Collection of Pre- and Protohistoric Artifacts at the University of Jena =

Archaeological and historical collection in central Germany

50°55′27.63″N 11°35′1.78″E

The Collection of Pre- and Protohistoric Artifacts at the University of Jena was founded in 1863 as the Germanic Museum of the University of Jena and existed under this name until 1945. After the Second World War, it was known as the Prehistoric Museum of the Friedrich Schiller University of Jena, Institute of Prehistoric Archaeology, until 1968. The collection belongs to the Department of Prehistory and Early History of the Friedrich Schiller University of Jena. Courses in prehistoric archaeology have been offered in Jena since 1859, with some short interruptions. The institute has had its own professorship since 1934 and is concerned with the preservation of archaeological monuments in Thuringia.

== Contents of the collection ==
Today, the collection comprises about 45,000 inventory units from about 1500 mainly European sites, of which about 1000 are located in Central Germany. The finds date from the Paleolithic to the Early Modern Period. They consist mainly of ceramic vessels and their fragments, as well as stone and metal tools and weapons. There are also artifacts made of silver and gold as well as bone, ivory (mammoth teeth), amber, glass and wood.

The artifacts originate from various regions in Europe, including the Vézère valley in France, Jordansmühl in Silesia, Hallstatt in Austria, La Tène in Switzerland, and Montegiorgio in Italy. Currently, the collection is not readily available to the public and is expected to remain so in the near future. However, some parts of the collection are displayed in smaller exhibitions or as permanent loans in regional museums, as well as in national and international exhibitions both domestically and abroad. They have frequently been used as the foundation for initial descriptions of archaeological cultures or periods, such as the Linear Pottery, Corded Ware, Dreitzsch culture, or Großromstedt culture.

The collection also includes significant supra-regional find compilations for research purposes. These contain Celtic palaeolithic artefacts from Oelknitz, the Celtic beak-spouted ewer from Borsch, the Latène period mask fibula from Ostheim vor der Rhön, the Imperial period pair of magnificent fibulae from Dienstedt, and more.

== History of the institute and the collection ==
=== 1859-1929 - First steps ===
Friedrich Klopfleisch (1831–1898) was a Privatdozent in art history who taught at the University of Jena from 1859. He is considered one of the founders of pre- and protohistory studies at the institution. In 1866, he began recording the architectural and artistic monuments of Thuringia, although this endeavor was initially unsuccessful. In 1875, Klopfleisch was appointed as an associate professor. From 1894, he focused exclusively on prehistoric archaeology. However, he resigned as a professor and museum director in 1896 due to a serious illness.

Alfred Götze (1865–1948) was one of Klopfleisch's most prominent students. In 1890, he completed his doctorate with one of the earliest prehistoric dissertations on "The vessel forms and ornaments of Neolithic cord-decorated pottery in the Saale river basin". Other Thuringian archaeology students under Klopfleisch included Ludwig Pfeiffer (1842–1921), who was one of the excavators of the paleolithic site in Weimar-Ehringsdorf, Armin Möller (1865–1938), who served as the curator of the Weimar Museum of Prehistory for a long time, and Gustav Eichhorn (1862–1929), who was a medical officer.

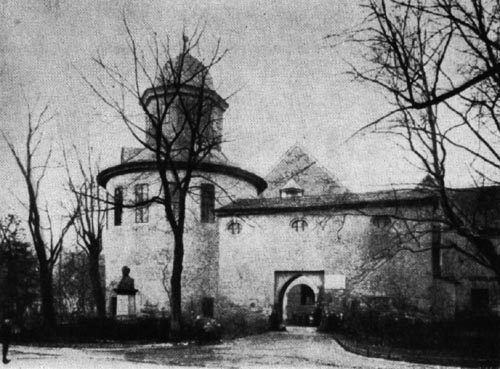
The Germanic Museum in the round tower of Jena Castle (1863–1904)

In 1863, Klopfleisch donated his collection of prehistoric, folkloristic, and art-historical objects to the university and became the director of the "Germanisches Museum zu Jena". The museum was initially located in the round tower of the castle building, which also constituted the northeastern corner of the city fortifications. Klopfleisch expanded the museum's inventory by acquiring large collections such as the "Praehistorica" from the Grand Ducal Library in Weimar, and including items from the estate of Johann Wolfgang von Goethe. However, most of the artifacts were obtained through Klopfleisch's excavations. During his approximately thirty-year tenure in Jena, he conducted over 150 excavations at more than 80 sites, covering the entirety of present-day Thuringia and neighboring states, with a focus on Jena and Weimar. Some of the most well-known investigations include those conducted at Jenzig mountain near Jena starting in 1856, the Palaeolithic site of Taubach near Weimar starting in 1870, and the Leubingen tumulus of the Aunjetitz culture in 1877. After Klopfleisch's death, prehistory and early history teaching was interrupted for the time being. From 1900, the collection was looked after voluntarily by his student Gustav Eichhorn, who was employed as curator from 1902. Soon after beginning his work for the museum, Gustav Eichhorn created the archive for prehistoric and protohistoric finds news and thus founded a centralized archaeological heritage management in politically fragmented Thuringia. Since 1904, there had been plans to make "the University of Jena the center of prehistoric research in Thuringia" with the help of "a kind of archive". In 1904, the collection moved into several rooms of the former Collegium Jenense since the old palace was demolished for the construction of the new main university building. Here, Eichhorn reorganized and inventoried the collection, exchanging the historical objects for prehistoric finds from the city museum. Private collections, such as those from Otto Schott (containing Hallstatt period finds from the Picenum), Otto Hauser (containing Palaeolithic artifacts from France), and Arno Schröder (containing finds mainly from the Jena area, but also from all over Central Europe), now complemented the inventory of the Germanic Museum.

In 1918, Einhorn took over the administration of the "Prehistoric (formerly Germanic) Museum" and was also allowed to give lectures on prehistory and early history at the request of the Faculty of Philosophy. In recognition of his contributions, he was appointed as a full honorary professor in 1927. Soon after, in 1928, Einhorn fell seriously ill and died in Jena on October 15, 1929.

In 1926, the Faculty of Philosophy was granted the authority to confer doctorates in the major and minor subjects of Prehistory and Early History. During Eichhorn's brief tenure, Herbert Jankuhn (1905–1990) and Gotthard Neumann (1902–1972) counted among the students of prehistory. Nevertheless, in 1928, Eichhorn was able to award his only doctoral student, Hildegard Knack with her dissertation on "The La Tène Culture in Thuringia". Knack, who majored in prehistory in Easter of 1924, was the second woman, after Rowena Morse, to receive a doctorate from the University of Jena.

The excavations in the Elbe Germanic burial ground of Großromstedt, carried out between 1907 and 1913 and 1926 and 1928 with Philipp Kropp, are of particular importance. The material was already presented in a monograph by Eichhorn in 1927. Eichhorn also conducted several rescue excavations around Jena and focused on processing and presenting Klopfleisch's excavations.

=== 1930-1945 - Upswing under National Socialism ===
Several weeks after Gustav Eichhorn's death, Wilhelm Frick, the Nazi Minister of National Education, tried to appoint the racial scientist Hans F. K. Günther as a full professor of prehistory at the University of Jena, replacing the interim deputy administrator Wilfried von Seidlitz (1880–1945). However, this attempt was met with resistance from the prehistorians, the rector, and the senate.

In 1930, Gotthard Neumann (1902–1972), a former student of Eichhorn, took charge of the Germanic Museum. Starting from the winter semester of 1930/31, Neumann offered courses as a volunteer assistant at the Department of History. During the Nazi era, prehistory and early history gained importance, leading to the establishment of seven positions for this subject in the German Reich in 1934, four of which were full professorships. In this year, Reichsstatthalter Fritz Sauckel appointed Neumann as an associate professor of prehistory without prior habilitation. In 1936, the Germanic Museum moved into the house of the disbanded student fraternity Sängerschaft zu St. Pauli Jena at Forstweg 24. The display collection was then opened to the public in ten rooms. The inventory had already grown rapidly through the acquisition of several private collections.

The institute was expanded into a state institute for prehistory. Neumann supervised the preservation of archaeological monuments in large parts of present-day Thuringia. Major archaeological research and rescue excavations were conducted with the participation of members of the Reich Labor Service and students of prehistory and early history. Examples of these excavations are: an Upper Palaeolithic open-air settlement in Oelknitz (1932), Late Bronze Age cremation burials and an early medieval terraced cemetery in Zöllnitz (1933 and 1936), a medieval moated castle in Kapellendorf (1933), and a medieval tower mound in Jenalöbnitz (1934). Between 1934 and 1938, the medieval imperial castle Kyffhausen and the medieval castle Camburg were visited. Additionally, six Corded Ware burial mounds near Lucka-Breitenhain and one Late Neolithic burial mound near Stobra were explored during 1935-1936 and 1941–1942. In 1936, an early Iron Age urn cemetery and an early medieval terraced cemetery near Dreitzsch were investigated. Finally, in 1940, Bronze Age burial mounds near Völkershausen-Willmanns were examined along with others.

At the onset of the Second World War, all male employees and their deputies were drafted into the Wehrmacht one after the other until January 1941, which brought the institute's activities to a virtual standstill. The administration of the museum was taken over by Bernhard Struck (1888–1971), who was a professor of Anthropology and Ethnology in Jena. Gudrun Loewe (1914–1994) assumed the role of assistant and took over the field and office work. From 1941 to 1944, Leonhard Franz (University of Leipzig/University of Innsbruck, 1895–1974) taught prehistoric and early historical subjects at the university. In 1943, the institute building was used to accommodate 60 female forced laborers from the Carl Zeiss Jena company. The following year, the public library for Thuringia was relocated to the same building. During this time, the collection, which had been only partially removed, was severely damaged. Neumann was appointed full professor shortly before the end of the war, with effect from February 1, 1945. However, he was unable to take up this position.

=== 1945-1991 - Continuity in the GDR ===
After returning from American captivity, Neumann began reorganizing the institute and rebuilding the museum in June 1945. It was renamed the Prehistoric Museum of the Friedrich Schiller University of Jena, Institute of Prehistoric Archaeology. In December 1945, Gerhard Mildenberger took over the business from Leipzig on a deputy basis after Neumann's dismissal by the Soviet military administration. Teaching activities were suspended until October 1947, when Günter Behm (from 1953 Behm-Blancke; 1912–1994) was appointed acting director of the museum and given a lectureship in prehistory and early history. In 1949, he became a lecturer in Prehistory, and in 1951 and 1953, he was appointed Professor with full teaching assignments. In 1961, he became a Professor with full teaching assignments for Prehistory and Early History (equivalent to associate professor). Starting in 1947, Neumann was re-employed at the museum. In 1953, he was appointed as a professor with a full teaching assignment for prehistory and early history, as well as director of the institute. He was promoted to a full professorship in 1956 and retired in 1967. His assistants and lecturers included Waldtraut Schrickel from 1947 to 1958 and Karl Peschel from 1959, after she moved to the Federal Republic of Germany.

The display collection of the Jena Institute, which reopened in August 1949, became a study collection for students and specialists, while the museum in Weimar was expanded in 1953 to become the State Museum of Prehistory and Early History of Thuringia and a center for the preservation of archaeological monuments. In 1958, Neumann was able to reorganize the collection by purchasing several private collections. Thuringian topics continued to be the main focus, with new investigations into the pre-Roman Iron Age and the stone castle at Römhild, which Neumann took over in 1949 after the death of Alfred Götze. During rescue and research excavations in the greater Jena area, Schrickel focused on the Neolithic and Neumann on the pre-Roman Iron Age and the Middle Ages, including the deserted settlement of Gumprechtsdorf in the former Klosterlausnitz state forest (1952–1953), the development of the medieval towns of Jena and Lobeda (1953–1956), the Bronze Age and Early Medieval castle wall on the Johannisberg near Jena-Lobeda (1957, 1959), and the castle and monastery of St. Peter in Saalfeld (1964). In 1968, Günter Behm-Blancke was reappointed as the director of the institute. As part of the GDR's third university reform in the same year, the institute was to be merged with the State Museum of Prehistory and Early History of Thuringia in Weimar. Consequently, the collections were relocated to rooms in the Wasserburg Kapellendorf and a school in Weimar. However, the university institute maintained its independence and continued to exist as the "Prehistory and Early History department" within the newly founded "(Philosophy and) History section of the Friedrich Schiller University's Faculty of Social Sciences". In 1973, the institute relocated to Ernst-Thälmann-Ring 24a (now Löbdergraben 24a again) and the collections were returned.

Until his emeritation in 1977, Behm-Blancke was full professor and head of the Department of Prehistory and Early History of the History section. In 1977, Karl Peschel succeeded him as head of the Department of Prehistory and Early History, and in 1979, he was appointed university lecturer. Following the requirements of the Third Higher Education Reform, specialist academic training was discontinued in Jena, Leipzig, and Greifswald in 1968. Although teaching continued, it was now focused on training history teachers.

The research activities focused on the pre-Roman Iron Age in the low mountain region, with emphasis on Celtic and Germanic peoples. The Elbe-Germanic cemetery at Großromstedt was reworked and investigations were conducted on the Celtic settlement of southwest Thuringia in the Hallstatt and Latène periods, particularly the Gleichberge near Römhild by Karl Peschel. Until 1989, due to a lack of personnel, technical resources, and financial support, only small and emergency excavations were possible. Nevertheless, the department remained responsible for preserving archaeological monuments in the city and district of Jena.

After the Peaceful Revolution and the reunification of Germany, all employees of the institution were dismissed in October 1990 due to their affiliation with the History Section. They were subsequently rehired after examination.

=== Since 1991 - After the Peaceful Revolution ===
In 1991, Peschel refocused his teachings on pre- and protohistory. He was granted a professorship in 1993 and retired in 1999. The Bilzingsleben research site, founded in 1974 by Dietrich Mania (* 1938), was transferred from the Halle State Museum of Prehistory to Friedrich Schiller University in 1993, due to the transfer of the Artern district to the Free State of Thuringia. Dietrich Mania began his career as a research assistant with a teaching assignment in Jena. In 1995, he was promoted to associate professor of prehistory, Quaternary geology, and paleontology. He retired in 2000.

In 2000, Peter Ettel was appointed as a professor and head of the Pre- and Protohistory Division. The division intensified excavation activities for research, education, and rescue excavations, with the Mühlen Eichsen cremation cemetery as an example. In 2002/03, the Jena tradition of medieval archaeology was resumed with the investigation of the central settlement at Karlburg near Karlstadt. Since 2004, the department has been involved in a DFG project researching the Nebra Sky Disk and its surroundings. In 2003, Clemens Pasda was appointed Professor of Prehistory and took over the Bilzingsleben research project.

== Bibliography ==
- Gustav Eichhorn: Führer durch die Sammlungen des Germanischen Museums der Universität Jena. Jena 1929.
- Roman Grabolle, Uwe Hoßfeld, Klaus Schmidt: Ur- und Frühgeschichte in Jena 1930–1945. Lehren, Forschen und Graben für Germanien? In: Uwe Hoßfeld, Jürgen John, Oliver Lemuth, Rüdiger Stutz (Hrsg.): „Kämpferische Wissenschaft“. Studien zur Universität Jena im Nationalsozialismus. Köln – Weimar – Wien 2003, S. 868–912, ISBN 3-412-04102-5
- Gotthard Neumann: Dr. Friedrich Klopfleisch, Professor der Kunstgeschichte an der Universität Jena, Begründer der thüringischen Urgeschichtsforschung. In: Mannus. Bonn 24.1932, 134–146. ISSN 0025-2360.
- Gotthard Neumann: Hundert Jahre Vorgeschichtliches Museum der Friedrich-Schiller-Universität Jena, Institut für Prähistorische Archäologie. in: Ausgrabungen und Funde. Akad.-Verl., Berlin 8.1963, 223–231. ISSN 0004-8127.
- Karl Peschel: Die ur- und frühgeschichtliche Sammlung. In: Reichtümer und Raritäten. Kulturhistorische Sammlungen, Museen, Archive und Gärten der Friedrich-Schiller-Universität Jena. in: Jenaer Reden und Schriften. Univ.-Verl., Jena 1974, 137–143. ISSN 0232-5969.
