= Marcomanni =

Ancient Germanic tribe of modern Bohemia

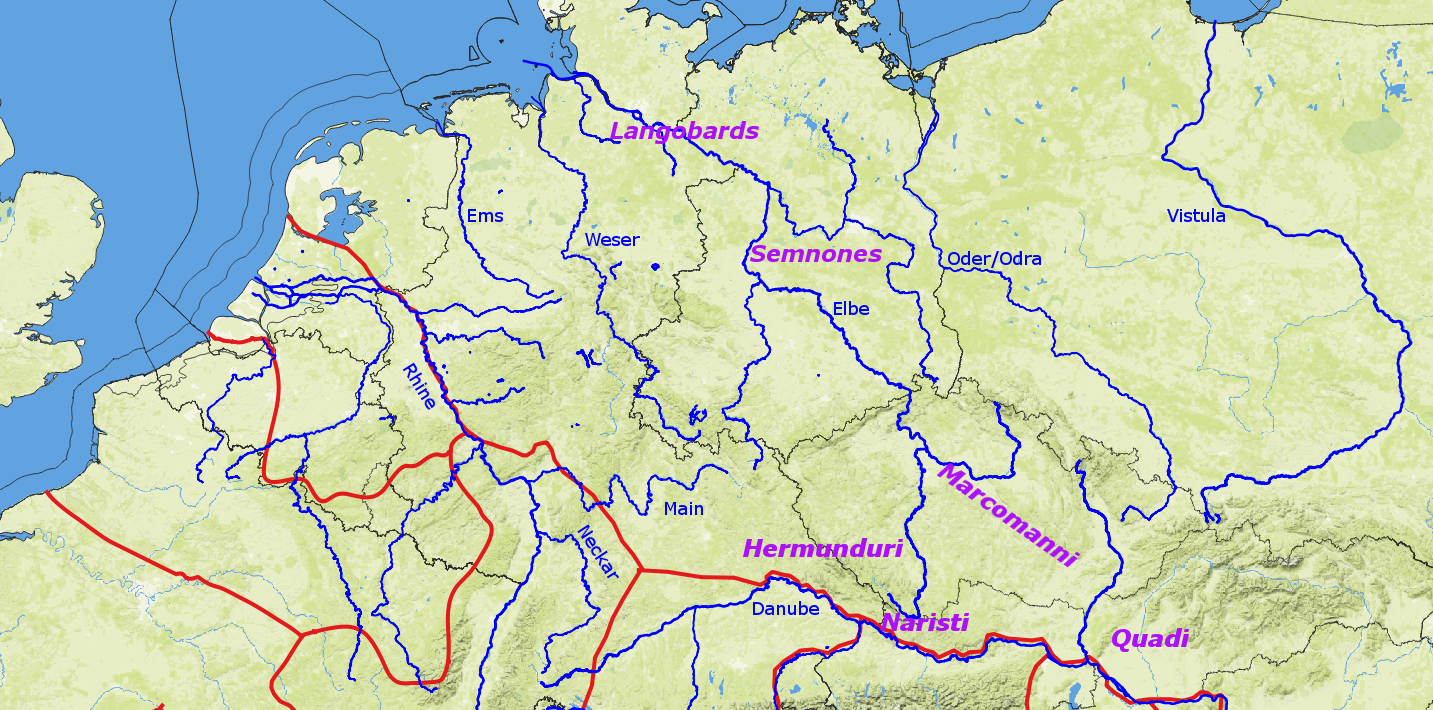
Approximate positions of some major Suebi peoples in the early 2nd century, in purple

The Marcomanni were a Germanic people who lived close to the border of the Roman Empire, north of the River Danube, and are mentioned in Roman records from approximately 60 BC until about 400 AD. They became one of the most important members of a powerful cluster of allied Suebian peoples, which also included the Hermunduri, Varisti, and Quadi north of the Danube, and the Semnones and Langobardi to their north. They were first reported by Julius Caesar among the Germanic peoples who were attempting to settle in west of the Rhine in Gaul in 58 BC under the leadership of Ariovistus, but he did not explain where their homeland was. Archaeological evidence suggests that they originally lived in what is now Germany, probably near the central Elbe river and Saale, or possibly to the southwest of this region in Franconia. After a major defeat to the Romans in about 9 BC, the Marcomanni received a new king named Maroboduus, who had grown up in Rome. He subsequently led his people and several others into a region surrounded by forests and mountains somewhere in what is now the Czech Republic, in a part they called "Boiohaemum" — the origin of the name Bohemia — because it was land that had been abandoned by the Boii people.

From his new base, Maroboduus built up a Rome-aligned Suebian empire, but the Langobardi and Semnones left when Maroboduus failed to support the rebellion of Arminius against Rome. The subsequent war among the Germanic peoples was damaging to both sides. This damaged Maroboduus's reputation, and he was eventually toppled from power, and died in exile in Ravenna. This suited the empire because despite their neutrality towards Rome, Roman rulers saw the Marcomanni as a potential threat to them, within striking distance of Italy. Over the centuries the Romans sought to control their leaders, and disrupt their relationships with neighbouring peoples. Despite long periods of peace and prosperity there were also several periods of intense warfare between them, often triggered by the actions of peoples living further from the Roman frontier.

In the second half of second century AD, during the reign of Marcus Aurelius and his co-emperors, the Romans pursued a long series of bloody wars against the Marcomanni and their allies which are called the Marcomannic Wars. At one point the Marcomanni and their allies invaded Italy itself. Eventually defeated and weakened, many Marcomanni were moved into the Roman empire, but the tensions behind this war were never resolved, and their neighbours such as the Quadi continued to come into conflict with Rome. This ended only when large numbers of Goths, Alans and Huns moved from the east and took effective control of the Middle Danubian region in the late 4th century. The Marcomanni and their neighbours needed to decide between the Rome-centred civilization, and the mobile and militarized life of the newcomers. One of the last clear mentions of the Marcomanni is in 395 when they, along with the neighbouring Quadi, joined Huns, Goths, Alans and others in a massive raid across the Danube into the fertile areas of the Roman Balkans, where Roman authors claimed that they left behind a desert. Many Suebi, probably including many Marcomanni, soon left the region entirely and travelled far to the west into Roman Gaul and then even further, founding the Kingdom of the Suebi in what is now northern Portugal and north-eastern Spain. Others joined in with what historian Herwig Wolfram called the "Hunnic Alternative" to Rome, because the newcomers now coalesced into the empire of Attila, whose warlords settled around the Middle Danubian, including Roman Pannonia.

Among the small new kingdoms which precipitated out of Attila's empire after his death in 453 was a single Suebian group. However, in the region where the Marcomanni had dominated were now Rugians and Heruli, and many Marcomanni had by now crossed the Danube and lived within what was left of the Roman Pannonia, and at least some of these had converted to Christianity. One group of Suebi, which probably included Marcomanni, apparently found a new home between the Sava and Drava rivers in what is now Slovenia and northern Croatia. In the 6th century, although the details are now unclear, many Suebian communities from the region of the Elbe and Danube are believed to have joined the Langobardi (Lombards) who moved from the north, replacing the short-lived kingdoms which arose after Attila's death, and subsequently moved into Italy under pressure from the arrival of the Avars from the east. Other people descended from the Marcomanni are likely to have joined the Alemanni and Bavarians to their west, or to have become integrated with the newcomers.

== Name ==
It is believed that the name of the Marcomanni comes from a Germanic language. The first part derives from a Proto-Germanic word reconstructed as *markō meaning "border, boundary", which is also the origin of the English words march and mark, meaning "frontier", or "border", as for example in the term "Welsh Marches". They were therefore "border men". The Marcomanni already had this name before they encountered the Romans in Gaul in 58 BC, where both the Romans and the Marcomanni were foreigners. Their homeland up until that time, and therefore the frontier or march they originally lived near, is unknown.

== The time of Caesar and Ariovistus (58 BC) ==
The Marcomanni first appear in historical records among the confederates of Ariovistus who fought against Julius Caesar in Gaul. Ariovistus led a large group of Germani settlers who had crossed the Rhine from what is now Germany, into what is now France. Caesar's report of his battles mentions the Marcomanni among them only once, in his account of his victory in 58 BC. Caesar wrote that he approached the Germanic camp and forced them to draw up their forces. They "arranged them by tribe (generatim, by gens), at equal distances, the Harudes, Marcomanni, Tribocci, Vangiones, Nemetes, Sedusii, Suebi; and surrounded their whole army with their chariots and wagons, that no hope might be left in flight. On these they placed their women, who, with outstretched hand and in tears, entreated the soldiers, as they went forward to battle, not to deliver them into slavery to the Romans." According to Caesar the Tribocci, Vangiones and Nemetes came from homelands nearby to the Rhine itself, but the others apparently came from further east.

The exact position of the Marcomanni homelands east of the Rhine at this time is not known. Although there is no scholarly consensus, one of the most common proposals is that they came from the Mainfranken region in northwestern Bavaria. It is generally accepted that they lived near to, or even among the Suebi, because later Roman writers connect the two peoples, and because of archaeological evidence showing Elbe Germanic peoples first entering present day central Germany and later entering the modern Bohemian area at the right time to match the Marcomanni. Caesar understood the country of the Suebi he faced to be in or near present day Hesse, Franconia, and Thuringia. Caesar himself made no mention of any special connection between the Suebi and Marcomanni, because he only mentioned the Marcomanni once in a list. It is nevertheless possible the Marcomanni were already seen as a branch of the Suebi, although this categorization is only made explicit in much later authors such as Strabo and Tacitus. Alternatively, between Caesar and Strabo there may have been changes in the relationship between the Suebi and Marcomanni, or in the terminology that was used. Caesar described the Suebi he encountered as the largest and the most warlike Germanic people (gens), who were divided into 100 districts (pagi) which supplied 1000 men each during war. The forces of these pagi were distinct within the Suevi forces, and it is sometimes suggested that the Marcomanni could have been one of these pagi. The Suebi were also able to call upon other countries (nationes) to supply infantry and cavalry reinforcements.

A later Roman historian, Cassius Dio, mentioned that part of a country where the Marcomanni had recently lived was settled by the Hermunduri in 7 BC with Roman permission, and this was apparently west of the Elbe, if we can assume that the events he described happened in one campaign. However this area is also not easy to identify. This is partly because the Hermunduri themselves were pushed east of the Elbe soon after, by the time of Strabo, who was writing around 20 AD. (Generations later, in the time of Tacitus around 100 AD, the Hermunduri were again friendly with Rome, and once again living west of the Elbe, stretching to the Danube in Raetia, apparently near present day Regensburg and Passau, to the "sources" of the Elbe, which may include the Vltava. However, it can't be assumed that this is the same region they settled in 7 BC.)

In terms of archaeological evidence the Marcomanni and their Suebian neighbours are strongly associated with the Grossromstedter archaeological culture of the Middle Elbe and Saale river regions. The area of this culture expanded southwest into the region between the Rhine and Werra before the Roman empire entered the region. And after the Roman conquests began it can be found expanding southeast into the Bohemian region. It was influenced not only by the older Jastorf culture of the central Elbe region, but notably also by the Przeworsk culture from further east in present day Poland. The variant which subsequently developed in the old Boii lands is called the Plaňany-Group, and shows the influence of their older Celtic La Tène culture associated with earlier Celtic peoples of these regions, such as the Boii and Volcae Tectosages. The present day Czech region had itself already come under Przeworsk influence in the generations before the Germanic influx. The name of the Marcomanni, which refers to a frontier, may echo an earlier demarcation somewhere between such Germanic and Celtic cultures.

The Marcomanni are archaeologically difficult to distinguish among the various Suebian groups such as the Quadi and Hermunduri who were bringing the Grossromstedter culture southwards and westwards. Furthermore, the Grossromstedter culture already began to have some influence in the Bohemian area after Caesar's victories, and before the Marcomanni defeat in 9 BC.

== Near extermination by the Romans (9 BC) ==
In the time of Augustus (reigned 27 BC – 14 AD), major invasions of Germania were launched, giving the Romans effective control of the part between the Rhine and Elbe rivers, until the rebellion of Arminius in 9 AD. During this period the Marcomanni suffered at least one major defeat and subsequently moved themselves into a more remote area surrounded by mountains and forests.

In the Res Gestae Divi Augusti which celebrates the reign of Augustus, it is boasted that among the many kings who took refuge with Augustus as suppliants, there was a king of the Marcomanni Suebi. The name of this king is no longer legible on the Monumentum Ancyranum, but it ended with "-rus".

The Roman historians Florus and Orosius reported that Drusus the elder almost wiped out the Marcomanni as part of a bloody and difficult campaign, and then erected a mound of Marcomanni spoils. This was during his campaigns of 12–9 BC, happening after he had defeated the Tencteri and Chatti, and before next turning to confront an alliance of the Cherusci, Suevi, and Sicambri. Another Roman source, Cassius Dio, describes the sequence of events somewhat differently, but does not mention the Marcomanni by name:

Drusus, [...] invaded the country of the Chatti and advanced as far as that of the Suebi, conquering with difficulty the territory traversed and defeating the forces that attacked him only after considerable bloodshed. From there he proceeded to the country of the Cherusci, and crossing the Weser, advanced as far as the Elbe, pillaging everything on his way. [...] Drusus undertook to cross this river, but failing in the attempt, set up trophies and withdrew.

There are doubts, therefore, about the exact sequence of events, and also about the locations of the battles. Scholars are not unanimous about whether the victory over the Marcomanni happened in 9 BC, which was the year of the victory over the Cherusci, Suebi and Sugambri, and also the year that Drusus died after reaching the Elbe. The location of the Marcomanni battle is often assumed to be in Franconia but an alternative hypothesis is that it was closer to the Cherusci, in the area of northeastern Hesse and western Thuringia. There are also scholars who propose that the Suebi defeated in the 9 BC campaign were in fact the same as the Marcomanni.

== The move to "Bohemia" ==
In 7 BC, a later Roman historian, Cassius Dio, implies that the Romans settled the Hermunduri where the Marcomanni had previously been living, suggesting that the Marcomanni had left a previous homeland in the period 9-7 BC. According to the accounts of Tacitus, Velleius Paterculus, and Strabo the Marcomanni indeed moved into a part of the large area that had been occupied by the Boii, a region called Baiohaemum, where their allies and fellow Suevi lived, the Quadi. Scholars interpret this placename as clear early evidence of a Germanic language being used. Haemum corresponds to English "home" and German "Heim" (Proto-Germanic *haimaz), while the change from boi- to bai- corresponds to normal evolutions in Germanic languages. This ancient term is the origin of the modern regional name Bohemia, although the boundaries of this region were likely quite different from medieval and modern versions. These classical authors place the new settlement area of the Marcomanni within the Hercynian Forest, in an area near present day Bohemia, and probably within it. By 6 BC, their king, Maroboduus, had established a powerful kingdom there that Augustus came to perceive as a threat to the Roman Empire. The archaeological evidence of this period, including both a number of cremation and inhumation burials, hints at a stratified society which gave special importance to its warrior class.

- Strabo, writing about 23 AD, appears to have written the earliest surviving mention of the long-term neighbours of the Marcomanni, the Quadi. Strabo described a mountain range running north of the Danube, like a smaller version of the Alps which runs south of it. Within it is the Hercynian Forest, and within this forest are tribes of Suebi "similar to" [or "such as"] "the tribes of the Coldui [καθάπερ τὰ τῶν κολδούων], in whose territory lies Buiaimon, the royal seat of Maroboduus". King Maroboduus, he wrote, led several peoples into this forested region, including his own people the Marcomanni. Having lived in Rome and been favoured by Augustus he became ruler of Suevi peoples in this forested region, and also over other Suevi living outside it bordering on the Dacians (who he calls Getae). Not only is Strabo's spelling of Quadi with an "L" unexpected when compared to later references, but some scholars also doubt that the Maroboduus lived within Quadi territory. Errors are suspected in the surviving text. He goes on to specify that the Hercynian forest is on the north side of the Suebi, and the Gabreta Forest is on the southern or Roman side.
- A contemporary of Strabo, Velleius Paterculus, also described "Boiohaemum", where Maroboduus and the Marcomanni lived. He said these "plains surrounded by the Hercynian forest" were the only part of Germania which the Romans did not control in the period before the Roman defeat at the Battle of the Teutoburg Forest in 9 AD. Velleius also remarked that Maroboduus subjugated all his neighbours either by war or treaty. Hofeneder notes that many modern scholars interpret this to mean that the Quadi were also under his overlordship. Although there is no consensus about this, it is in any case clear that the two Quadi and Marcomanni were closely connected during the several centuries in which they appear in records. Velleius said that Maroboduus drilled his Bohemian soldiers to almost Roman standards, and that although his policy was to avoid conflict with Rome, the Romans came to be concerned that he could invade Italy. "Races and individuals who revolted from us [the Romans] found in him a refuge." From a Roman point of view he noted that the closest point of access to Bohemia was via Carnuntum. This was between present-day Vienna and Bratislava, and near the Quadi territory where the Morava river enters the Danube.
- Approximately 100 AD, Tacitus reflected upon the Marcomanni in his time and in the past, saying they "stand first in strength and renown, and their very territory, from which the Boii were driven in a former age, was won by valour", suggesting that they had to defeat the remaining residents of the area. He also mentioned that both the Marcomanni and their neighbours the Quadi have "kings of their own nation, descended from the noble stock of Maroboduus and Tudrus". However, he noted that they submit to foreigners, and their strength and power depend on Roman influence. Rome supports them by arms, and "more frequently by our money".

== The empire of Maroboduus ==
Maroboduus built up a Rome-aligned Suebian empire. According to Strabo, it included the Lugii and Semnones, and he also mentioned otherwise unknown peoples: Zumi, Butones (perhaps the Gutones), Mugilones and Sibini. He also mentioned the "Coldui", probably the Quadi, who were Suebians whose territory apparently surrounded Boihaemum. Velleius and Tacitus made it clear that by 5 AD the alliance also included the Langobardi. According to Velleius he could call upon 70,000 experienced infantry and 4,000 cavalry, although these were probably not only Marcomanni.

In 6 AD, Augustus aimed to eliminate the last power center in Germania and sent two Roman army groups under Sentius Saturninus and Tiberius to attack the Marcomanni in a pincer movement starting from Roman camps or bases which were in or near in present day Marktbreit to the west and Carnuntum on the Danube. This did not go ahead because a major revolt started in Pannonia, south of the Danube, which had also only recently been conquered. Maroboduus remained neutral.

In 9 AD, Arminius of the Cherusci began his major revolt against the Romans. He sent the head of the defeated Roman general Publius Quinctilius Varus to Maroboduus, but Maroboduus sent it to Rome. The Langobardi and Semnones, Suebians living near to the Cherusci on the Elbe, defected from this kingdom in the name of freedom, both because Maroboduus did not support the revolt, and because he held royal power.

In 17 AD war broke out among these two alliances of Germanic peoples, led by Arminius and Maroboduus. Maroboduus requested help from Rome but the Romans reject him. According to Tacitus the Romans claimed that Maroboduus "had no right to invoke the aid of Roman arms against the Cherusci, when he had rendered no assistance to the Romans in their conflict with the same enemy". After an indecisive battle, Maroboduus withdrew into the hilly forests of Bohemia in 18 AD. According to Tacitus, the Romans reacted by deliberately sowing discord among the Germani, "urging them to complete the destruction of the now broken power of Maroboduus". This was all in line with the new foreign policy of the emperor Tiberius.

Already in 19 AD, Maroboduus was deposed and exiled by Catualda, who was a prince who had been living in exile among the Gutones, living near the Baltic coast, in what is now northern Poland. Maroboduus went into exile among the Romans and lived another 18 years in Ravenna.

== The Vannius regime ==
Catualda's victory was short-lived. He was in turn deposed by Vibilius of the Hermunduri that same year he came to power, 19 AD. The subjects of Maroboduus and Catualda, presumably mainly Marcomanni, were moved by the Romans to an area near the Danube, between the Morava and "Cusus" rivers, and placed under the control of the Quadian king Vannius. There are proposals that the Romans were deliberately trying to create a buffer state with this settlement, but there is no consensus about this. The area where Vannius ruled over the Marcomanni exiles is generally considered to have been a state distinct from the old Quadi kingdom itself. Unfortunately the Cusus river has not been identified with certainty. However, Slovak archaeological research locates a core area of the Vannius kingdom was probably in the fertile southwestern Slovak lowlands around Trnava, east of the Little Carpathians. On the other hand, at the same time there were similar increases in activity west of the Little Carpathians near the Morava.

Vannius personally benefitted from the new situation and became very wealthy and unpopular. He was himself eventually also deposed by Vibilius and the Hermunduri, working together with the Lugii from the north, in 50/51 AD. Vannius's soldiers during this conflict are described here as infantry, but he also called for cavalry from his Sarmatian allies and neighbours, the Iazyges, who lived in what is now Hungary. This revolt by Vibilius was coordinated with the nephews of Vannius, Vangio and Sido, who then divided his realm between themselves as loyal Roman client kings. Vannius was defeated and fled with his followers across the Danube, where they were assigned land in Roman Pannonia. This settlement is associated with Germanic finds from the 1st century AD in Burgenland, west of Lake Neusiedl.

The Marcomanni are not specifically mentioned much in subsequent generations, possibly because they were now politically part of the Vannian regime which was centred around the Quadian powerbases closer to the Danube. Archaeological and other evidence indicates that the Marcomanni population also more generally moved, or at least became more active, to the southeast near the Morava river, while the Quadi and the Vannian kingdom expanded further east in the direction of what is now Hungary. Archaeological evidence shows further increase in the Germanic population just north of the Danube after the fall of Vannius, in present day Lower Austria, Moravia and western Slovakia. At the same time this region also received increasing amounts of imports from within the empire. The organization of the Marcomanni and Quadi states into different kingdoms is not made clear by surviving evidence, but it is believed that by this time the Marcomanni kingdom now came to stretch into this Danubian area, probably including areas in Moravia and Lower Austria, west of the Little Carpathians.

In 69 AD, the "Year of the Four Emperors", two kings Sido and Italicus, the latter perhaps the son of Vangio, fought on the side of Vespasian in a Roman civil war. Tacitus described them as kings of the Suebians, and emphasized their loyalty to Rome. They were present at the second battle of Bedriacum in 69 AD at Cremona.

The Quadi and Marcomanni had a long and relatively stable relationship with the Romans but this was interrupted under emperor Domitian during the years 89-97 AD, after the Quadi and Marcomanni refused to assist in a conflict against the Dacians. In 89 AD, according to Dio Cassius, Domitian entered Pannonia to make war, killed the peace envoys sent to him, and was then defeated by the Marcomanni. This campaign was referred to as the war against the Suebi, or the Suebi and Sarmatians, or the Marcomanni, Quadi and Sarmatians. The relationship then stabilized again in the time of emperor Nerva (reigned 96-98).

== Marcomannic Wars ==
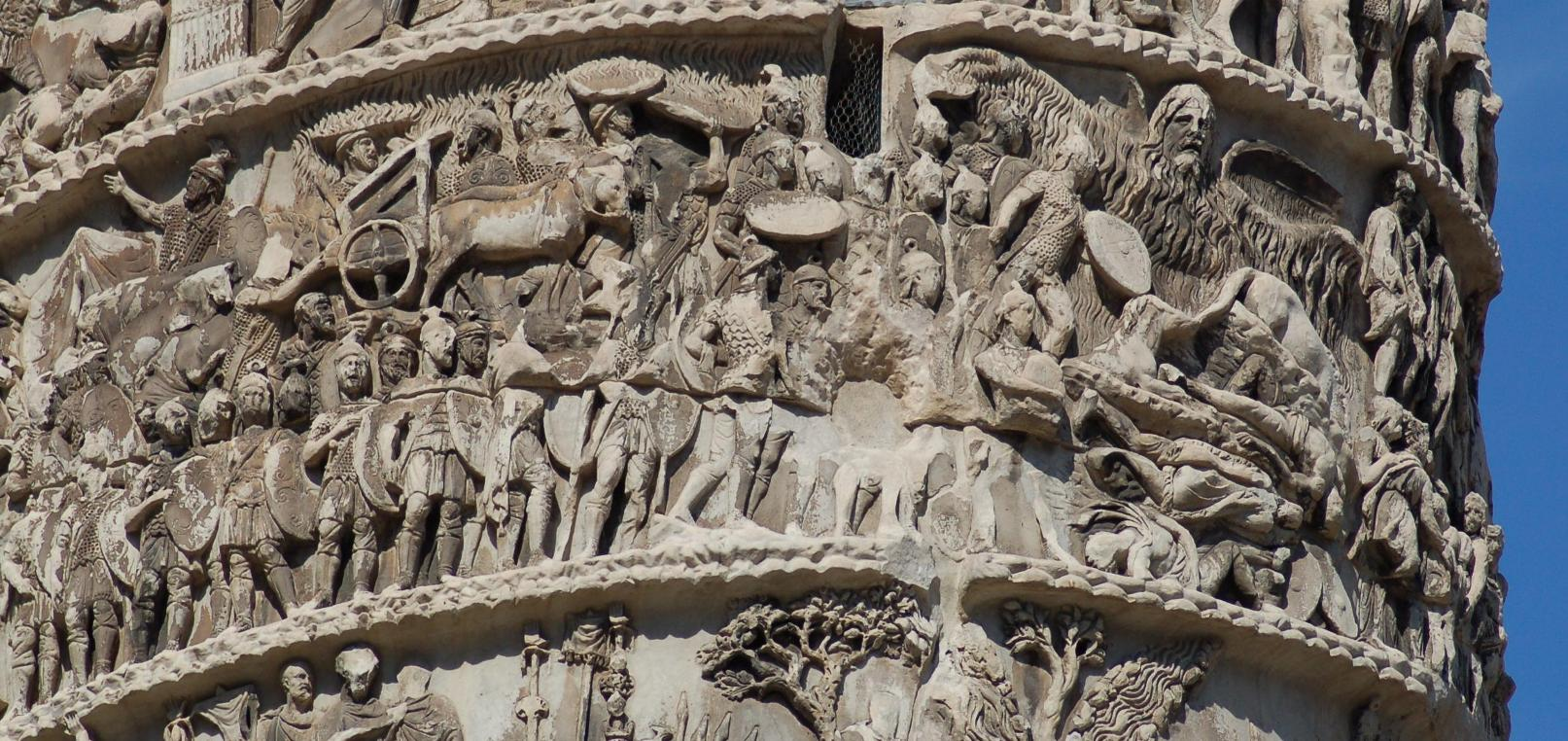
The "Miracle of the Rain" depicted on the Column of Marcus Aurelius in Rome

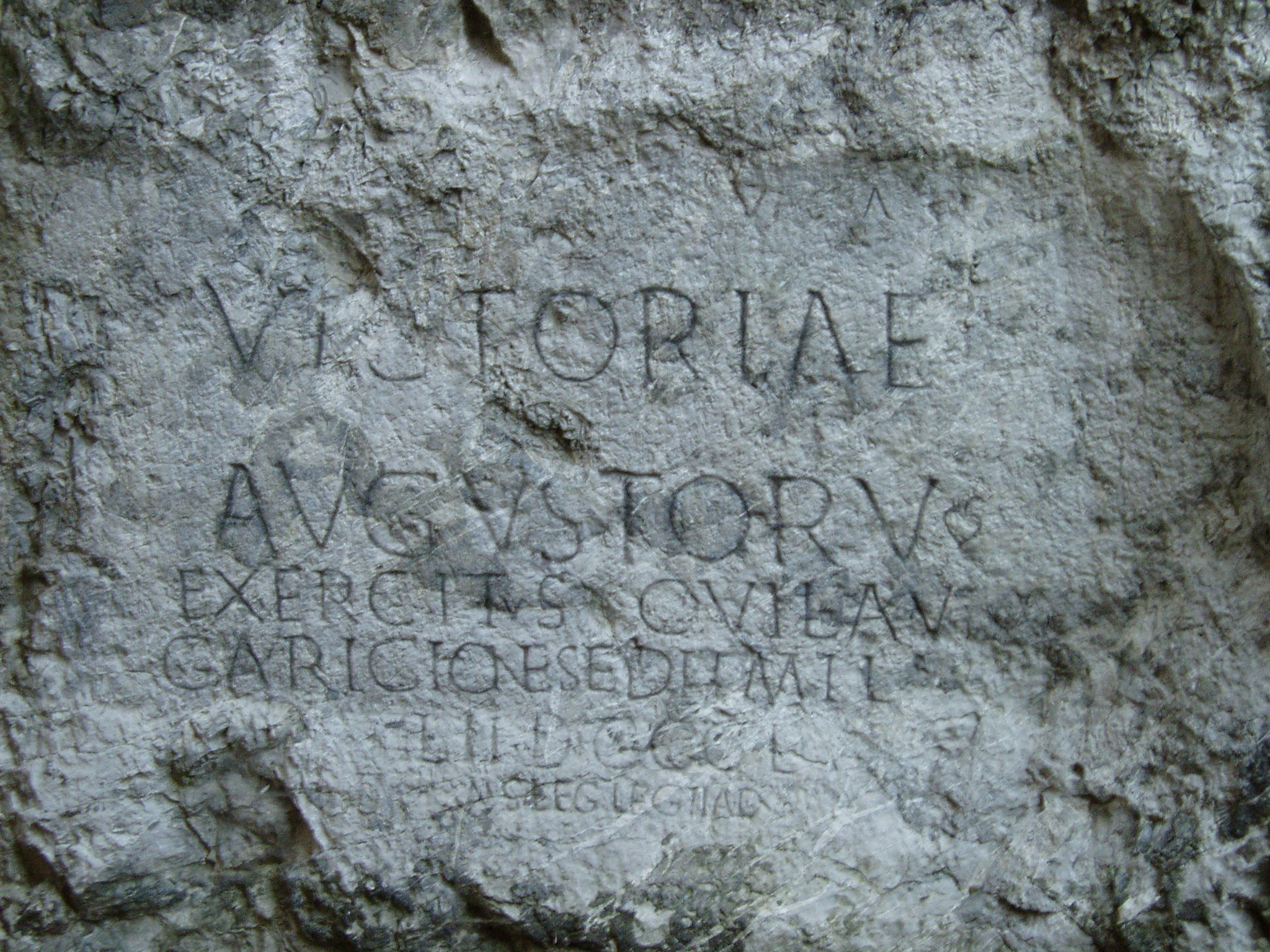
A monument found in Trenčín. "To the victory of emperor dedicated by 855 soldiers of II. Legion of an army stationed in Laugaricio. Made to order of Marcus Valerius Maximianus, a legate of the Second Auxiliary legion."

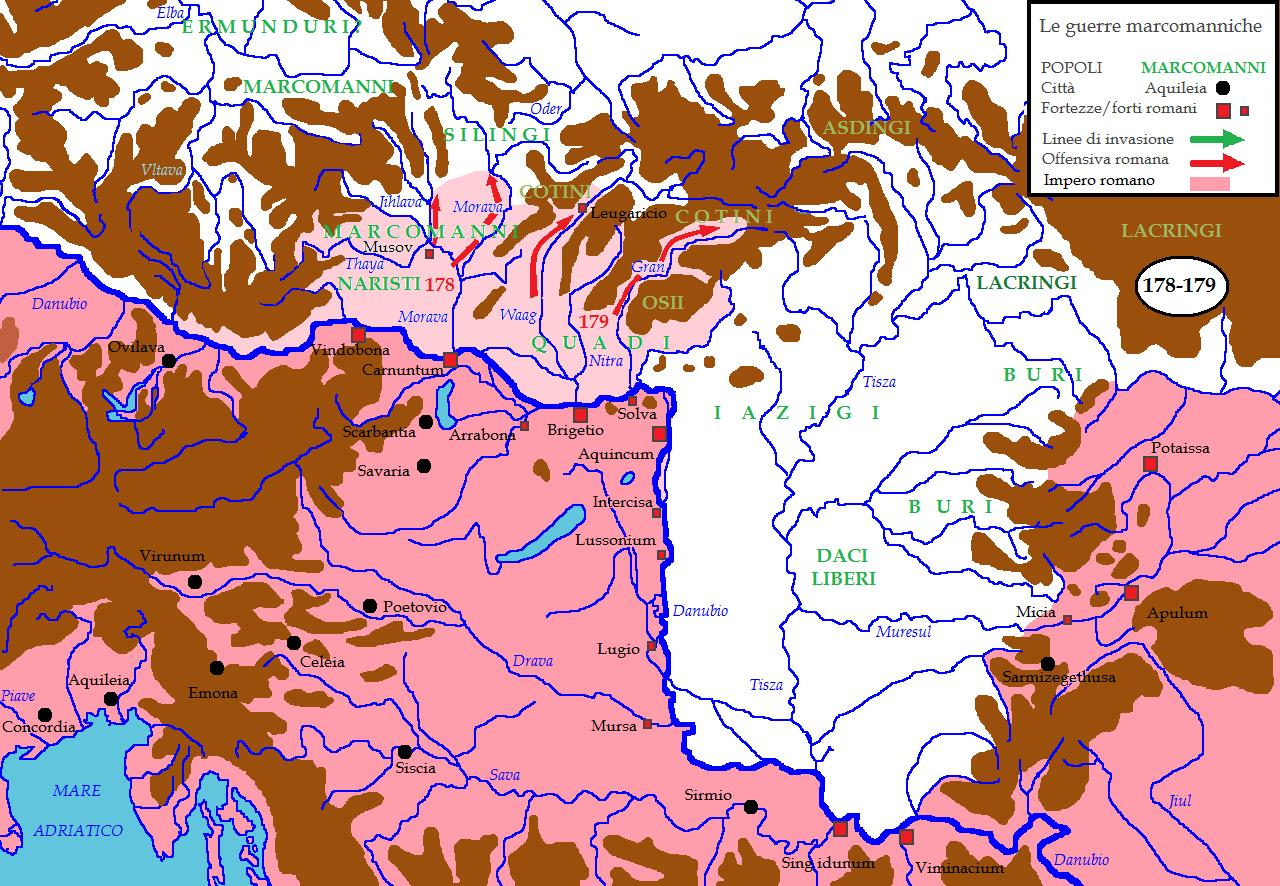
The light pink area north of the Danube was temporarily occupied by the Romans in 178–179 AD and was meant to become the new Roman province of Marcomannia

The relationship between the Romans and the Quadi and their neighbours was far more seriously and permanently disrupted during the long series of conflicts called the Marcomannic or Germanic wars, which were fought mainly during the rule of emperor Marcus Aurelius (reigned 161-180 AD).

In the 150s or 160s AD, 6000 Langobardi (Lombards originally from present-day north Germany) and Obii (whose identity is uncertain) crossed the Lower Danube into Roman territory where they were quickly defeated. Dio Cassius reports that these events worried several of the barbarian nations. A group of them selected Ballomarius, king of the Marcomanni, and ten other representatives of the other nations, in a peace mission to the governor of Roman Pannonia. Oaths were sworn and the envoys returned home. Some scholars think the Quadi may have been involved in this raid, or at least allowed it to happen. However the Quadi and their neighbours were facing their own problems with raiders from further north, and had been trying for some time to get more support from the empire. On their side, the Romans were apparently planning for a Germania campaign, and knew that Italy itself was threatened by these pressures, but were deliberately diplomatic while they were occupied with the Parthian campaign in the Middle East, and badly affected by the Antonine plague. However, the Historia Augusta especially blames the Marcomanni and Victohali for throwing everything into confusion while other tribes had been driven on by the more distant barbarians.

Although a Roman offensive could not start in 167 AD, two new legions were raised and in 168 AD the two emperors, Lucius Verus and Marcus Aurelius, set out to cross the alps. Either in 167 AD, before the Romans setting, or in 169 AD, after the Romans came to a stop when Verus died, the Marcomanni and Quadi led a crossing of the Danube, and an attack into Italy itself. They destroyed Opitergium (present-day Oderzo) and put the important town of Aquileia under siege. Whatever the exact sequence of events, the Historia Augusta says that with the Romans in action several kings of the barbarians retreated, and some of the barbarians put anti-Roman leaders to death. In particular, the Quadi, having lost their king, announced they would not confirm an elected successor without approval from the emperors.

Marcus Aurelius returned to Rome but headed north again in the autumn of 169. He established a Danubian headquarters in Carnuntum between present-day Vienna and Bratislava. From here he could receive embassies from the different peoples north of the Danube. Some were given the possibility to settle in the empire, others were recruited to fight on the Roman side. The Quadi were pacified, and in 171 AD they agreed to leave their coalition, and returned deserters, and 13,000 prisoners of war. They supplied horses and cattle as war contributions, and promised not to allow Marcomanni or Iazyges passage through their territory. By 173 AD the Quadi had rebelled again, and they expelled their Roman-approved king Furtius, replacing with Ariogaisos. In a major battle between 172 and 174 AD, a Roman force was almost defeated, until a sudden rainstorm allowed them to defeat the Quadi. The incident is well-known because of the account given by Dio Cassius, and on the Column of Marcus Aurelius in Rome. By 175 AD the cavalry from the Marcomanni, Naristae, and Quadi were forced to travel to the Middle East, and in 176 AD Marcus Aurelius and his son Commodus held a triumph as victors over Germania and Sarmatia.

The situation remained disturbed in subsequent years. The Romans declared a new war in 177 AD and set off in 178 AD, naming the Marcomanni, Hermunduri, Sarmatians, and Quadi as specific enemies. Rome executed a successful and decisive battle against them in 179 AD at Laugaricio (present-day Trenčín in Slovakia) under the command of legate and procurator Marcus Valerius Maximianus. By 180 AD the Quadi and Marcomanni were in a state of occupation, with Roman garrisons of 20,000 men each permanently stationed in both countries. The Romans even blocked the mountain passes so that they could not migrate north to live with the Semnones. Marcus Aurelius was considering the creation of a new imperial province called Marcomannia when he died in 180.

Commodus the son of Marcus Aurelius made peace soon after the death of his father in 180 AD, but he did not go ahead with plans to create a new Roman province. Some Marcomanni were subsequently settled in Italy and other parts of the empire, while others were forced to serve in the military.

== Third century ==
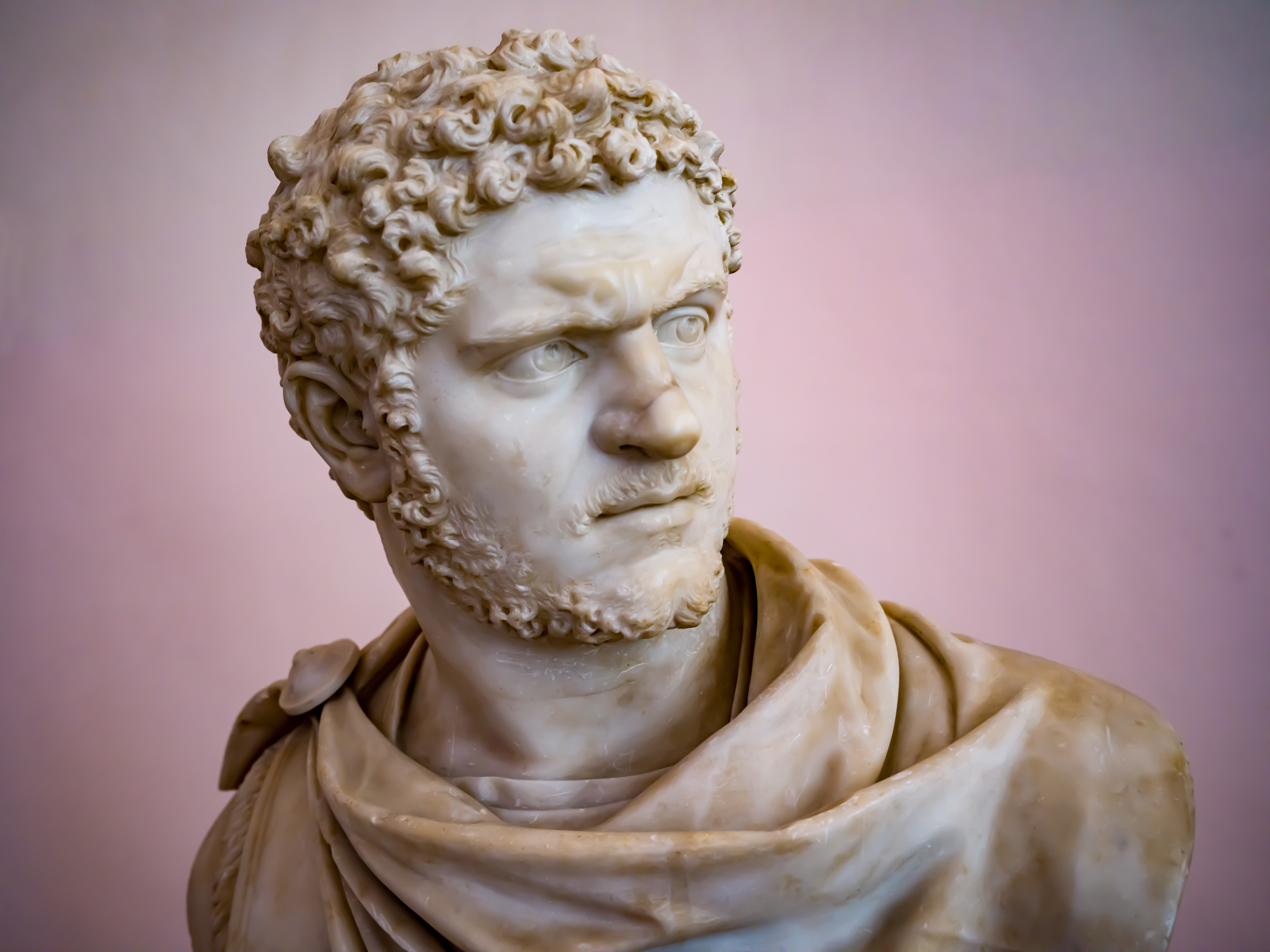
Caracalla: Museo Nazionale Napoli

Around 214/215 AD, Dio Cassius reports that because of raids into Pannonia, the emperor Caracalla invited the Quadi king Gaiobomarus to meet him, and then had him executed. According to this report Caracalla "claimed that he had overcome the recklessness, greed, and treachery of the Germans by deceit, since these qualities could not be conquered by force", and he was proud of the "enmity with the Vandili and the Marcomani, who had been friends, and in having executed Gaïobomarus".

The centre of activity of the Suebians along the Danube shifted east during the third century, towards what is now the Slovakia-Hungary border. This apparently reflects the increased importance of the Quadi, and the decreased importance of the Marcomanni.

During the reign of the Roman emperor Philip the Arab (reigned 244-249 AD), who cut off gifts which were being paid to Ukrainian Goths under the rule of Ostrogotha, the 6th century writer Jordanes believed that the Marcomanni were also paying tribute to this same Gothic king, and the princes of the Quadi were effectively slaves of the Goths.

During the reign of Valerian (253-260 AD) the historian Zosimus reported that the Marcomanni made excursions at the same time as "Scythians" (Goths and allied peoples from Ukraine), making inroads into all the countries adjacent to the empire, laying Thessalonica waste. Valerian's son Gallienus (reigned 253-268 AD) settled the Marcomanni within the Roman province of Pannonia Superior, south of the Danube. He also took Pipa or Pipara, the daughter of the Marcomanni king, Attalus, as a concubine.

Although the details are not clear, the emperor Diocletian claimed a triumph over the Marcomanni in 299 AD.

== Fourth century and later ==
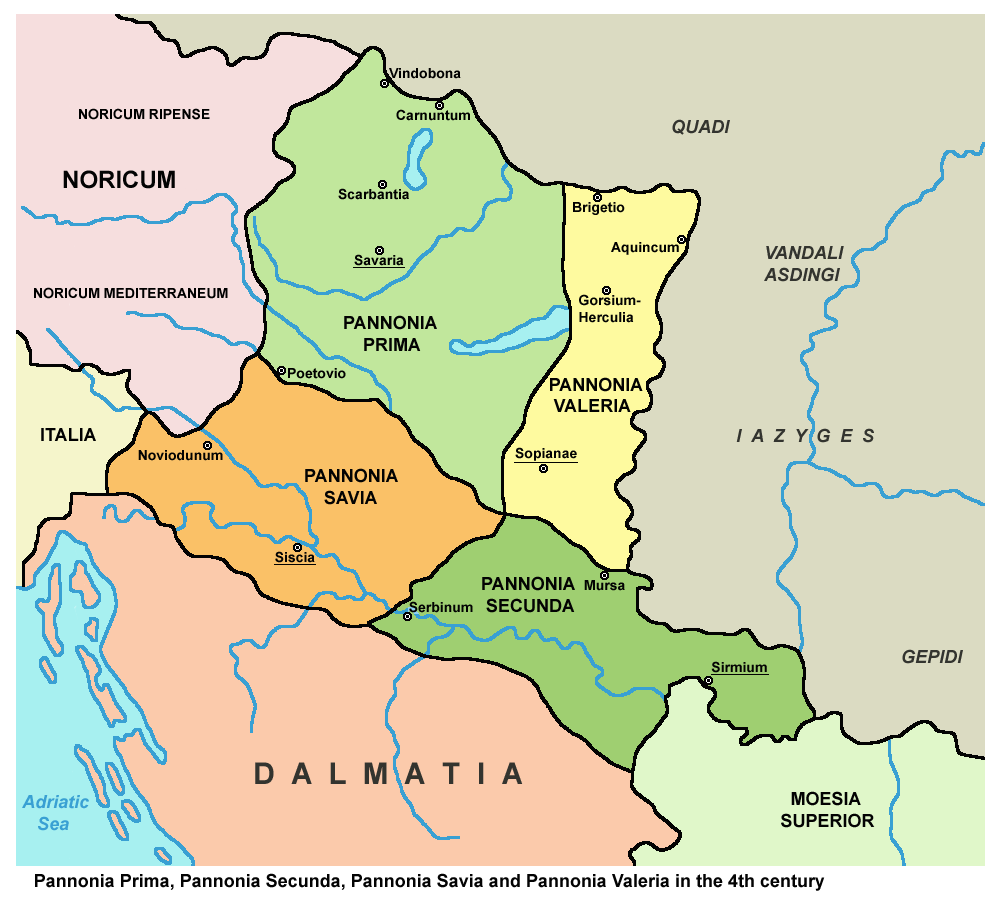
4th-century Roman Pannonia

Although the Quadi and other allies continued to be mentioned by historians in the fourth century, the records say little about the Marcomanni until after the death of Valentinian I during a period of conflict with the Quadi in 375 AD, and after the great Roman defeat by the Goths, Alans and Huns at the Battle of Adrianople in 378 AD. It seems that the Rugii and Heruli may have already moved into the Marcomanni's traditional region during this period. The Laterculus Veronensis shows that Heruli and Rugii were already present somewhere in western Europe in about 314. Similar listings from later in the 4th century, the Cosmographia of Julius Honorius, and probably also the Liber Generationis, both listed the Heruli together with the Marcomanni and Quadi, in whose traditional region the Herule kingdom would later be found.

The defeat at Adrianople had a major impact upon the Middle Danubian region, both inside and outside the empire. Although there is no consensus about the details, the Romans now quickly tried new approaches to settling newcomers in large numbers. One of the armed groups responsible for the defeat, led by Alatheus and Saphrax, were settled into the Pannonian part of the Roman empire, south of the Marcomanni, and expected to do military service for Rome. Rome lost effective control of the regions beyond the Danube, and even Roman Pannonia itself. The Goths, Alans and Huns suddenly came to dominate several regions in Southeast Europe, including areas supposedly still within the empire, and large numbers of these peoples were integrated within the Roman military.

After the death of emperor Theodosius I in 395, Saint Jerome listed the Marcomanni, Quadi, Vandals and Sarmatians, together with several of the new eastern peoples causing devastation in the Roman provinces stretching from Constantinople to the Julian Alps, including Dalmatia, and all the provinces of Pannonia: "Goths and Sarmatians, Quadi and Alans, Huns and Vandals and Marcomanni". Claudian describes them crossing the frozen Danube with wagons, and then setting wagons around themselves like a wall at the approach of the Roman commander Stilicho. He says that all the fertile lands between the Black Sea and Adriatic were subsequently like uninhabited deserts, specifically including Dalmatia and Pannonia. At the same time, the Gothic general Alaric I, who had loyally served with his Gothic troops under Theodosius I at the Battle of Frigidus only a few months earlier, began his rebellion which led to the creation of the Visigoths. He started by leading his Rome-allied army south, first towards Constantinople, and later towards Greece. Alaric was triggered by internal Roman conflicts after the death of Theodosius. The exact connection between Alaric and the groups who crossed the Danube at the same time remains unclear. Claudian claimed that both groups were incited by Rufinus, an Eastern Roman consul and an enemy of Stilicho.

Soon after this, Ambrose, bishop of Milan 374-397, corresponded with a Christian Marcomanni queen named Fritigil, initiating a peace treaty between the Marcomanni and the western Roman military leader Stilicho. The Notitia Dignitatum, which lists Roman office-holders around 420 AD, also mentions a tribune of the Marcomanni gens (non Roman people) who answered to the dux of northern Noricum and Pannonia I, two Roman districts south of the Danube in what is now Austria. These are the last clear mentions of the Marcomanni having a polity, which was probably now on the Roman or southern side of the Danube. In this context it seems that the Marcomanni were given responsibility by the Romans for defence of Roman areas. Marcomanni soldiers were also dispersed around the empire by now. The Notitia Dignitatum lists palatine auxiliaries (court troops) of the Marcomanni Honoriani seniores and iuniores for Italy, as well as the Equites Marcomanni for the mobile army in North Africa.

The Romanized population in Noricum were still there until about 500, as described by Eugippius, but Pannonia to its east came under the control of the newcomers. In 406 a large invasion of Italy was launched from this region under a Goth named Radagaisus, who was defeated and killed with the help of Gothic and Hunnic forces who fought for the Romans. Other Middle Danubian left the area permanently and entered Roman Gaul. In 409, Saint Jerome noted that inhabitants of Roman Pannonia had in recent years joined large numbers of their non-Roman neighbours including Quadi, Vandals, Sarmatians, Alans, Gepids, Herules, and travelled west to occupy Gaul. Marcomanni may have been among these, and also among the Suebi who travelled still further west and established the Kingdom of the Suebi in the Roman province of Gallaecia.

In the Danubian area, Attila came to be acknowledged as ruler, and there were Suebi among his forces. Although contemporary reports did not specifically mention Marcomanni or Quadi, centuries later Paulus Diaconus listed the subject peoples who Attila could call upon, and in addition to the better-known Goths and Gepids, he mentioned "Marcomanni, Suebi, Quadi", alongside the expected "Herules, Thuringi and Rugii". This implies that Marcomanni might have been present under that name at the Battle of the Catalaunian Plains in 451. Modern scholars have doubts about whether the Marcomanni or Quadi would still have been distinguished from the other Suebi.

While it is not clear what happened to the Marcomanni and other Suebi during Attila's time, after he died in 453 a Suebian kingdom appeared which was ruled by men named Hunimund and Alaric. It existed in or near north-eastern Pannonia. Probably referring to these Suebi discussed by Jordanes, the much later Ravenna Cosmography, reported that the Marcomanni (Marconnorum gens) had held Pannonia Valeria. They were probably a mixture of Suebians, including many Quadi. After being defeated by the Ostrogoths, Hunimund and some of his Suebi moved west and joined the Alemanni. The record which mentions the Suebi joining the Alemanni is also one of the first records mentioning the early Bavarians, or Baiuvarii, who were now living south of the Danube, to the east of the Alemanni, in an area which had been Roman territory, and was still heavily Romanised. It is generally believed that their name is Germanic, and that it indicates an origin somewhere in the nearby regions to the east, including Roman Noricum and Pannonia, which were once inhabited by the Boii. This makes it very likely that the Baiuvarii included Marcomanni.

Possibly distinct from the Suebi led by Hunimund, the Suebi of the Sava or Suavia province of Pannonia south of Valeria, between the Sava and Drava rivers, continued to exist during the time when the Ostrogoths ruled Italy. It is possible that some of the Suebi of Hunimund moved into this more southern area after their defeat, or they may have been a separate group. During the Ostrogothic period, these Suebi were legally distinguished from the native populations under the term "old barbarians" (antiqui barbari), which also distinguished them legally from the new non-Romans, the Goths. Unusually, they were legally permitted to marry the provincial residents, and could therefore become part of the land owning class. Some scholars believe these were descendants of the Christian Marcomanni of Queen Fritigil. During the time of Theoderic the Great a group of Alemanni crossed the alps with cattle and wagons to seek refuge with these antiqui barbari. Procopius noted that in 537, the Ostrogoths recruited an army of these Suebi to launch an attack against areas held by the Eastern Roman empire. In 540 Ostrogothic rule in the Sava region came to an end, and these Suebi came under the authority of Eastern Roman emperor Justinian.

In the 530s the Langobardi (Lombards), who had been moving southwards in steps over several generations, entered the Sava area, and in the 540s the Eastern empire ceded control of it to them. The Suebi of the Sava region were among the peoples who were allowed to assimilate into Lombard society, if they accepted to live as Lombards under Lombard law. The Lombards, facing pressure from the arrival of the Avars into the area, moved into Italy and began taking control of it, bit by bit.

== Other ==
There is a runic alphabet called the Marcomannic runes, but they are not believed to be related to the Marcomanni.

== See also ==
- Elbe Germanic peoples
- Irminones

== Sources ==
- Beneš, Zdeněk; Bursák, Daniel (2017), "Plaňany-Group in Bohemia. Three case studies with an emphasis on ceramics", in Michałowski; Teska; Niedzielski; Żółkiewski (eds.), Settlements Pottery of the pre-Roman Iron Age in Central European Barbaricum – new research perspectives, Poznań
- Castritius, Helmut (2005), "Sweben § 8-13", in Beck, Heinrich; Geuenich, Dieter; Steuer, Heiko (eds.), Reallexikon der Germanischen Altertumskunde, vol. 30 (2 ed.), De Gruyter, ISBN 978-3-11-018385-6
- Danielisova, Betka (2020), "Bohemia at the End of the La Tène Period: Objects, Materials, Chronology, and Main Development Trends - A Review", Památky Archeologické, 111: 113–157, doi:10.35686/PA2020.3
- Dobesch, Gerhard (2002), "Obii (Obioi)", in Beck, Heinrich; Geuenich, Dieter; Steuer, Heiko (eds.), Reallexikon der Germanischen Altertumskunde, vol. 21 (2 ed.), De Gruyter, ISBN 978-3-11-017272-0
- Green, Dennis (2014), "The Boii, Bohemia, Bavaria", in Fries-Knoblach, Janine; Steuer, Heiko (eds.), The Baiuvarii and Thuringi: An Ethnographic Perspective, Series: Studies in Historical Archaeoethnology, Boydell & Brewer, pp. 11–21, ISBN 9781843839156
- Halsall, Guy (2007). Barbarian Migration and the Roman West, 376-568. Cambridge University Press. doi:10.1017/CBO9780511802393. ISBN 978-0-521-43491-1.
- Heather, Peter (1995), "The Huns and the End of the Roman Empire in Western Europe", The English Historical Review, 110 (435): 4–41, doi:10.1093/ehr/CX.435.4, JSTOR 573374
- Hamann, Stefanie (1973), "II. Historisches (Stand: 1973) § 4. Herkunft und erste Siedlung", in Beck, Heinrich; Geuenich, Dieter; Steuer, Heiko (eds.), Reallexikon der Germanischen Altertumskunde, vol. 1 (2 ed.), De Gruyter, ISBN 978-3-11-004489-8
- Hofeneder, Andreas (2003), "Quaden § 2. Historisches", in Beck, Heinrich; Geuenich, Dieter; Steuer, Heiko (eds.), Reallexikon der Germanischen Altertumskunde, vol. 23 (2 ed.), De Gruyter, ISBN 978-3-11-017535-6
- Kehne, Peter (2001a), "Markomannen § 1. Historisches", in Beck, Heinrich; Geuenich, Dieter; Steuer, Heiko (eds.), Reallexikon der Germanischen Altertumskunde, vol. 19 (2 ed.), De Gruyter, ISBN 978-3-11-017163-1
- Kehne, Peter (2001b), "Markomannenkrieg § 1. Historisches", in Beck, Heinrich; Geuenich, Dieter; Steuer, Heiko (eds.), Reallexikon der Germanischen Altertumskunde, vol. 19 (2 ed.), De Gruyter, ISBN 978-3-11-017163-1
- Kehne, Peter (2001c), "Markomannis", in Beck, Heinrich; Geuenich, Dieter; Steuer, Heiko (eds.), Reallexikon der Germanischen Altertumskunde, vol. 19 (2 ed.), De Gruyter, pp. 322–323, ISBN 978-3-11-017163-1
- Kolník, Titus (2003), "Quaden § 3. Historische Angaben und archäologischer Hintergrund", in Beck, Heinrich; Geuenich, Dieter; Steuer, Heiko (eds.), Reallexikon der Germanischen Altertumskunde, vol. 23 (2 ed.), De Gruyter, ISBN 978-3-11-017535-6
- Kulikowski, Michael (2007), Rome's Gothic Wars: From the Third Century to Alaric, Key Conflicts of Classical Antiquity, Cambridge University Press, doi:10.1017/CBO9781139167277, ISBN 978-0-521-84633-2
- Meier, Mischa (2010), "Alarich I.", Germanische Altertumskunde Online, De Gruyter
- Liccardo, Salvatore (2024), "Who in the world are the Heruli?", Early Medieval Europe, 32 (3): 284–305, doi:10.1111/emed.12712
- Möller, Peter (1986), "Drusus", in Beck, Heinrich; Geuenich, Dieter; Steuer, Heiko (eds.), Reallexikon der Germanischen Altertumskunde, vol. 6 (2 ed.), De Gruyter, ISBN 978-3-11-010468-4
- Scharf, Ralf (2005), "Sweben § 2-7", in Beck, Heinrich; Geuenich, Dieter; Steuer, Heiko (eds.), Reallexikon der Germanischen Altertumskunde, vol. 30 (2 ed.), De Gruyter, ISBN 978-3-11-018385-6
- Steuer, Heiko (2021), "Germanen" aus Sicht der Archäologie: Neue Thesen zu einem alten Thema, De Gruyter, doi:10.1515/9783110702675, ISBN 978-3-11-070267-5
- Tejral, Jaroslav (2001a), "Markomannen § 2. Archäologisches", in Beck, Heinrich; Geuenich, Dieter; Steuer, Heiko (eds.), Reallexikon der Germanischen Altertumskunde, vol. 19 (2 ed.), De Gruyter, ISBN 978-3-11-017163-1
- Tejral, Jaroslav (2001b), "Markomannenkrieg § 2. Archäologisches", in Beck, Heinrich; Geuenich, Dieter; Steuer, Heiko (eds.), Reallexikon der Germanischen Altertumskunde, vol. 19 (2 ed.), De Gruyter, ISBN 978-3-11-017163-1

== Classical sources ==
- Caesar De Bello Gallico, at The Latin Library
- Tacitus Germania, at The Latin Library
- Tacitus Annales, at The Latin Library
