= Vannius =

1st century AD king of the Germanic tribe Quadi

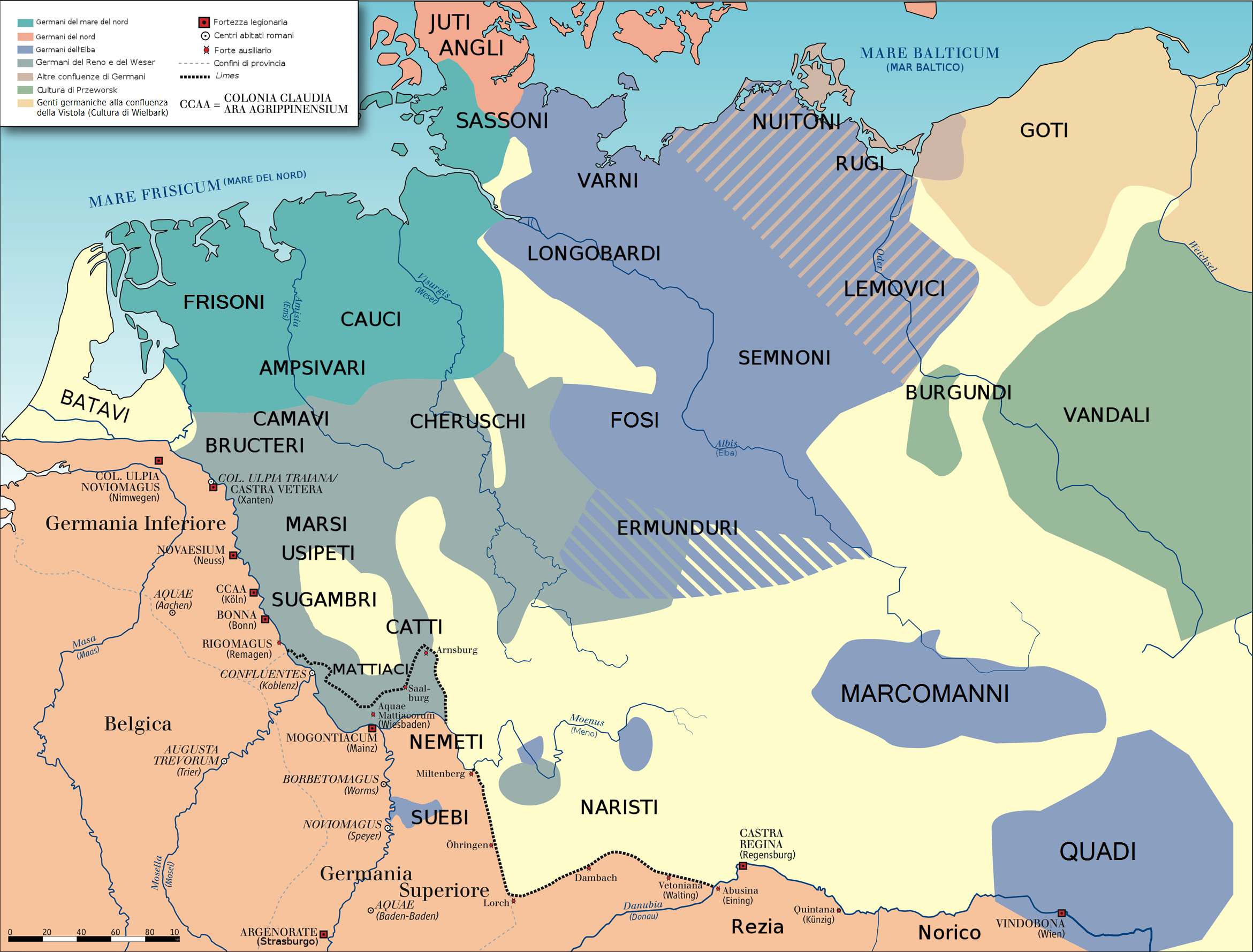
GermanenAD50-it.png

Vannius (flourished in 1st century AD) was the king of the Germanic tribe Quadi.

According to The Annals of Tacitus, Vannius came to power following the defeat of the Marcomannic King Catualda by the Hermunduri King Vibilius, establishing the Kingdom of Vannius (regnum Vannianum). It was the first political unit in the area that is now Slovakia. Vannius was a client king of the Roman Empire and ruled from 20 AD to 50 AD. Tacitus writes that he was "renowned and popular with his countrymen," but after a long reign, he "became a tyrant, and the enmity of neighbours, joined to intestine strife, was his ruin." Joined by Vangio and Sido, sons of a sister of Vannius, Vibilius of the Hermunduri again led the deposition. Emperor Claudius, decided to stay out of the conflict, fearing that the Lugii and other Germanic tribes would be attracted by the "opulent realm which Vannius had enriched during thirty years of plunder and tribute."

Vannius was easily defeated by the Lugii and the Hermunduri, although he won some credit through being wounded in battle. Vannius managed to flee to his fleet on the Danube, and was awarded lands in Pannonia by Claudius. His realm was subsequently divided between his nephews Vangio and Sido. Tacitus writes that Vangio and Sido were "admirably loyal" to the Romans, but among their subjects, by whom they were "much loved" while seeking to acquire power, they became "yet more hated when they acquired it."

== Sources ==
- Tacitus, The Annals
