= Lugii =

Roman-era tribal group in Central Europe

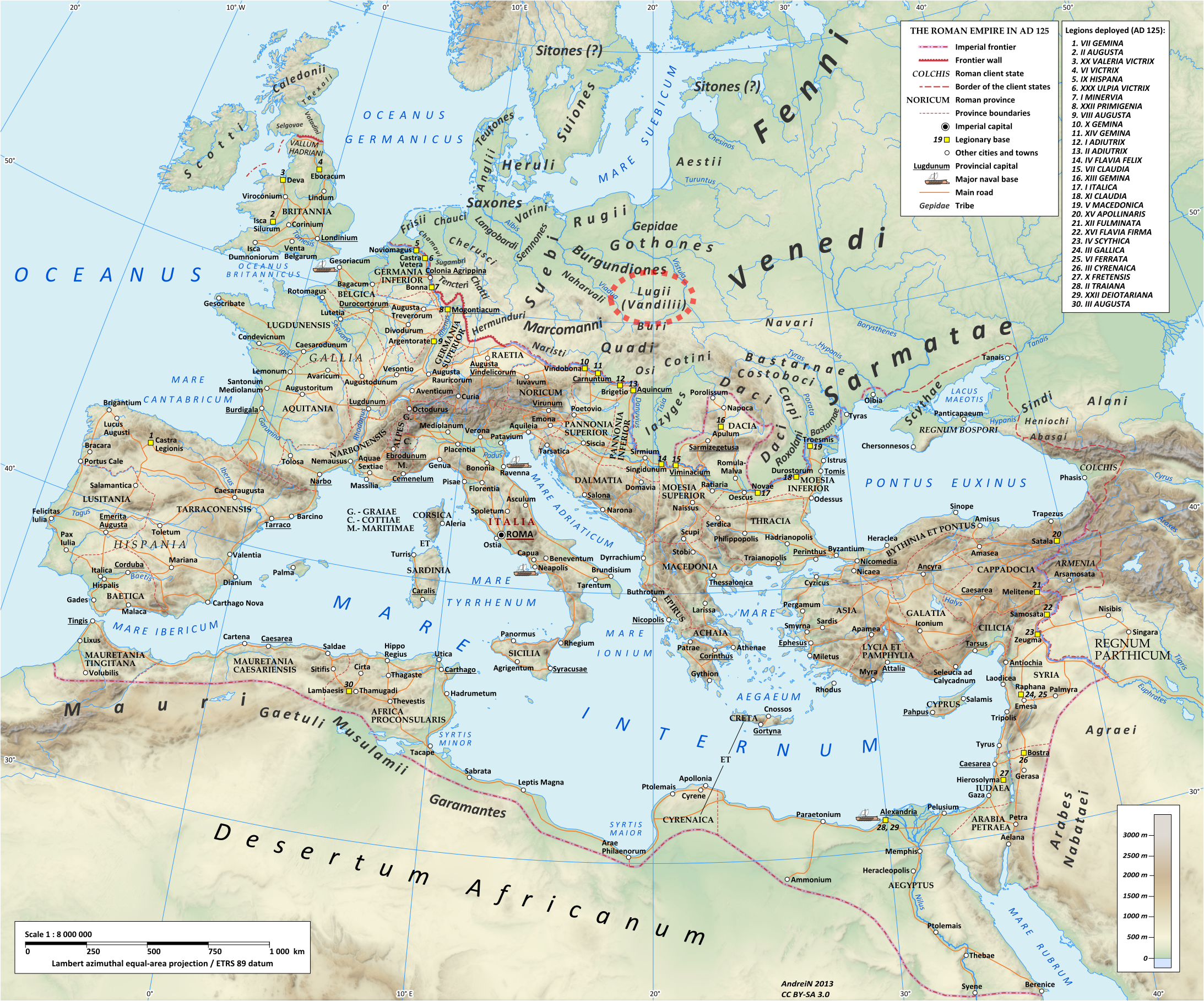
The Roman empire under Hadrian (ruled 117-138 AD), showing the location of the Lugii tribes between the Viadua (Oder) and Vistula rivers (marked with a red circle)

The Lugii (also Lugi or Lygii; Ancient Greek: Λοῦγιοι) were a group of peoples in central Europe, recorded by Greek and Roman authors from the early 1st century AD to the 3rd century AD. Rather than a single tribe, Tacitus describes them as a nomen, designating an overarching grouping that covered several communities (civitates) settled between the Oder and the Vistula. Several scholars have interpreted the Lugii as a multi-ethnic union in which earlier Celtic elements were gradually absorbed into Germanic formations. (Note: Neumann describes the Lugii as a Gesamtverbandes ("confederation"), Falileyev as a "tribal union", and Tausend as a Kultverband ("cult-based league").)

In the early 1st century AD, Strabo describes the Lugii as a large people drawn into the kingdom of Maroboduus, while Tacitus later records their role in the expulsion of the Suebic king Vannius in 50 AD. Under Domitian, in 92 AD, the Lugii sought Roman support against the Suebi. They then largely disappear from Greek and Roman sources after the 3rd century AD, apart from a disputed late notice in Zosimus concerning the reign of Probus (276–282).

Scholars have also often connected the Lugii, wholly or in part, with the later Vandals, with the name Lugii eventually being replaced or paralleled by Vandilii in ancient tradition, though this identification has also been questioned as probably more complex than a simple equation by some scholars. In archaeological terms both the Lugii and the Vandilii are generally identified with the Roman era Przeworsk culture.

== Name ==
=== Attestations ===
The ethnonym is first attested by Strabo, writing in the late Augustan period, who gives the accusative Lougíous (Λουγίους). Tacitus names the Lugii in the Germania, and again in the Annals, where they appear among the peoples who overthrew Vannius. Cassius Dio has the form Lýgioi (Λύγιοι), while Ptolemy writes Loýgoi (Λοῦγοι), the missing iota being most likely a copying error. The latest witness, Zosimus, gives the form Loggíōnas (Λογγίωνας), usually emended to Logíōnas (Λογίωνας) or Lougíōnas (Λουγίωνας), which may give evidence of an n-stem Lugiones, although its interpretation is unclear. (Note: Günter Neumann treats the n-stem (Lugiones, alongside Lugii) as possibly genuine, comparing Frisiones and Gotones. The apparent witness of the Tabula Peutingeriana, where Lupiones has been read as a corruption of Lugiones, is rejected by Helmut Castritius, who reads the entry as the unit Lupiones Sarmatae.)

Tacitus says of the Lugiorum nomen ('name of the Lugii') that it "extends most widely" (latissime patet) and is "spread across several communities" (in plures civitates diffusum). Latin nomen, meaning 'name', is used here in a way comparable to Latin expressions like nomen Latinum or nomen Sueborum designating an overarching grouping.

=== Etymology ===
The name has been explained in several ways, and no single derivation has won general agreement. Both a Germanic and a Celtic origin is possible. Günter Neumann points to a root *lug-/*leug- ('to swear, bind oneself by treaty'), attested only in Celtic and Germanic (Old Irish lu(i)ge, Welsh llw, Breton le; Old High German ur-liugi 'war, lawless state', Gothic liuga 'marriage'). According to Neumann, a stem meaning 'oath' would suit the name well, with a derived *Lugjōz meaning 'those belonging to an oath-bound league' or 'oath-comrades'. On this view the name would mark the solemn undertaking that sealed the union of several civitates, and would therefore be younger than the names of the individual tribes. Helmut Castritius finds this the most plausible account, taking the Lugii to be a confederation constituted by a mutual oath. According to Winfred P. Lehmann, the constituent Germanic peoples may have borrowed the root from Celtic. Yet it is also possible that both linguistic communities jointly reshaped this root, or gave a new meaning to an existing one. A Germanic origin may have stronger support if an n-stem Lugiones, possibly attested by Zosimus, is reckoned, in which case it would comparable to names like Frisiones, Gotones and Francones.

Among Celtic explanations, the name has been linked to the god Lugus, although difficulties have been noted, and to a Gaulish *lugo- ('black, dark', hence perhaps 'raven'). Alexander Falileyev objects that colour-names are rare in early Celtic tribal naming. He nonetheless suggests that the 'black' sense, if it was felt even as a folk etymology, may lie behind Tacitus's description of the Harii, who blacked their shields and dyed their bodies for night battle, possibly a play on the meaning of the name. The personal name Lugius, borne by a king of the Cimbri, has also been identified with the ethnonym by some scholars. According to Neumann, this is conceivable, especially since Orosius names alongside him a king Boiorix, who bears a Celtic name.

=== Constituent peoples ===
Tacitus names five member tribes, stating that he gives only the strongest: the Harii, the Helvecones, the Manimi, the Helisii and the Naharvali. Ptolemy names three sub-groups of the Lugii, the Omanoi (Ὀμανοί), the Dounoi (Δοῦνοι) and the Bouroi (Βοῦροι).

The Omanoi are generally identified with Tacitus's Manimi. The position of the Buri is contested. Ptolemy counts them among the Lugii, but Tacitus assigns them instead to the Suebi on the grounds of their language and way of life. Neumann judges the name to be securely Germanic. The lists also diverge over other groups not reckoned among the Lugii by Ptolemy. Tausend identifies the Helvecones with Ptolemy's Alouaíōnes (Ἀλουαίωνες), and the Naharvali, who held the central sanctuary, with the Vandalic Silingi.

The member names have been read in both Celtic and Germanic terms. The Harii are generally derived from Germanic *harja- ('fighter'), though a Celtic explanation has also been offered, with John T. Koch rendering the name as 'noblemen'. Helvecones has been traced to Germanic *elwa- ('yellow'). The second element of Naharvali has been compared with Celtic personal-name elements such as Ate-valus. Both elements of Victovali (a Vandalic sub-group) likewise suggest a Celtic origin. The name Buri is generally seen as Germanic, and compared with Gothic baúr, Old Norse byrr, and Old English byre ('son'), and also with the Norse personal name Búri.

Alexander Falileyev, who treats the name Lugii itself as probably Celtic, stresses that the union was formed by speakers of both languages. As a result, almost every member name may admit both Celtic and Germanic etymological interpretations, and some Gaulish names were possibly adapted over time by Germanic speakers.

== Ethnic identity ==
The ethnic affiliation of the Lugii is disputed, and the question turns on a distinction between the origin of the name and the make-up of its bearers. The ancient sources place the Lugii within Germania and, for Tacitus, within Suebia. The majority of scholars working on the Germanic peoples have regarded the group as predominantly Germanic, while acknowledging the presence of earlier Celtic elements.

Reinhard Wenskus took it for the name of an originally non-Germanic population, later transferred to the Germanic peoples who succeeded them in the same lands. He saw the Buri, Manimi, and Dounoi as non-Germanic tribal fragments which had gathered by the middle of the 2nd century BC under the umbrella of the Lugii together with Germanic tribes. In his view, the indigenous name for the totality of the tribes of Germanic origin was Vandili(i), this name gradually replacing the Lugian name in written tradition because of intensive contact with the Romans from the time of the Marcomannic War onward. Such a change of name would explain why the name of the Lugii disappeared relatively quickly from ancient tradition. Klaus Tausend also posits a cult-based league that joined a group of Celtic tribes, into which Germanic tribes were drawn from the late 2nd century BC, so that the body was already Germanic-dominated, though still with pre-Germanic elements by the time of Tacitus. According to this model, the 'Lugii' eventually became 'Vandals' through a continuous process of Germanisation: after the dissolution of the Lugian-Vandilic community, the name Lugii was eventually replaced by Vandalii for the strongest remaining individual tribes. Herwig Wolfram likewise holds that the Lugii and Vandals were probably part of the same cultic community, first under Celtic and later under Germanic dominance. This would explain why a group seen as mostly Celtic around the beginning of the Common era could be regarded as Germanic a century later, while the Lugian name continued to survive alongside Vandalic affiliations.

Helmut Castritius holds the Celtic origin of the name to be uncertain, and a Germanic one at least equally likely. Conceding that a Celtic origin of the name remains possible, he notes that a Celtic origin for the bearers of the name, in the sense of the decisive ethnic substance of a constructed community of descent and belonging, is against the unanimous ancient testimony, which treats them as Germanic. Castritius places the Lugii in the early phase of Roman-barbarian relations, when Celtic elements were giving way to newer ethnic formations, noting that the attestation of the personal name Lugius among the Cimbri and Teutones would fit this context. According to him, it may be assumed that large groupings such as the Lugii or the Suebi possessed considerable elasticity and frequently changing composition, and that the two designations for the same large group (Lugii and Vandilii) and may have been valid in parallel for some time. (Note: According to Castritius, Pliny the Elder, who knew Germania from personal observation as a Roman officer, may have learned and adopted the self-designation Vandili(i) from a native informant, whereas Strabo and the later authors used the name Lugii, which was familiar to the Roman world. When, during and after the great Marcomannic War, new ethnogenetic processes were triggered in the broad area east of the Oder and the Danube, and when indigenous traditions again gained greater force, the old name Vandili(i) or Vandali may gradually have prevailed over the name Lugii.)

Some scholars are more cautious about equating the Lugii with the Vandilii, since the inference is drawn largely from the fact that both are placed in the same part of modern Poland. The territory ascribed to the Lugii corresponds to that of the Przeworsk culture, Kazimierz Godłowski further proposing to identify the Lugii, wholly or in part, with the Przeworsk complex north of the Sudetes and Carpathians. Walter Pohl notes that Ptolemy does not count the Vandalic Silingi among the Lugii, so that the fixed classifications found in the older literature should give way to the considerable elasticity implied by large tribal groupings. Kazimierz Godłowski cautioned against treating the Przeworsk culture as wholly Vandalic, or identifying the Vandals automatically and completely with the Lugii. He held that the Przeworsk culture was not merely a sum of archaeological traits but answered to a community of many small tribes that shared customs and religious ideas and was bound by stable ties.

== Geography ==
The settlement of the Lugii cannot be fixed exactly, but it is generally agreed that they lay north of the Sudetes and the western Carpathians, between the Oder and the Vistula, perhaps as far as the middle Warta. This brings them within the area of the Przeworsk culture.

Tacitus categorizes the large area within which the Lugii live as part of Suebia. He says that the name of the Lugii is the most widespread name north of the east–west chain mountain ranges which cuts Suebia into two pieces. In the mountain range itself, to the south of the Lugii, he mentions the Marsigni, Gotini, Osi, and Buri and "of these, the Marsigni and Buri, in their language and manner of life, resemble the Suevi". South of the mountains were the powerful Suebian kingdoms of the Marcomanni and Quadi, north of the Danube.

According to Tacitus, to the north of the Lugii (trans Lugios, "beyond the Lugii") lay the Gotones.

In the second century, Ptolemy's geography lists several sub-tribes of Lugi along the western side of the Vistula. North of them, starting from the coast and going southwards, were first the Rutikleioi, Ailouaiones, and Burguntes (the Burgundians, whose western neighbours are the Semnones). The Lugi then begin in the following sequence: the Lugi Omani (with eastern neighbours the Silingi, who he does not call Lugii), then the Lugi Diduni until the Asciburgius mountains, and then on the south side of those mountain, west of the headwaters of the Vistula, are the Lugi Buri.

A settlement named Lugidunum, recorded only by Ptolemy, has traditionally been associated with the Lugii, though both its location and the bearing of its first element are uncertain. (Note: Lugidunum (Ptolemy 2.11.13) has been placed variously at Legnica, Głogów and Krosno Odrzańskie in Poland, and also in the modern Czech Republic. Xavier Delamarre distinguishes Lugi-dunum, 'fort of the Lugii', from Lugu-dunum, 'fort of Lugus', but Falileyev observes that no evidence ties the name to the territory of the tribe.)

== History ==
In the early 1st century AD, Strabo names the Lugii as one of the peoples that the Marcomannic king Maroboduus drew into his realm, calling them a "large people" (μέγα ἔθνος; méga éthnos). He recounts that Maroboduus was able to win them over, together with many other peoples, for the formation of his kingdom. (Note: In Strabo's list the form Βούτωνες stands near the Lugii. It has been corrected to Γούτωνες, or supplemented by Wolfgang Aly to Βου[ργουνδίωνες καὶ Γού]τωνες.) In the Annals, Tacitus places the Lugiorum nomen within Suebia and lists the Lugii among the peoples whose forces helped to drive out Vannius, the Roman-installed king of the Suebi.

Cassius Dio reports that the Lugii, at war with certain Suebi, sent envoys to Domitian seeking an alliance in 92 AD, and received a force of one hundred horsemen. Angered at this support, the Suebi joined with the Iazyges and prepared to cross the Danube against Pannonia. Domitian for his part concluded a treaty with the enemies of the Suebi, the Semnones and the Lugii. Castritius notes that Dio places these Lugii in Moesia, on the lower Danube, which does not fit their usual location.

The Lugii vanish from the Greek and Roman record in the 3rd century AD. Wenskus connected this with a change of name: the native name of the Germanic tribes of the region, Vandili(i), recorded by Tacitus and by Pliny the Elder, came to the fore in literature once Vandalic groups met the Romans directly during the Marcomannic Wars, and gradually displaced the older Lugian name.

Zosimus, writing around 500 AD, reports that the emperor Probus (276–282) crushed the Lugii under their king Semno in a great battle, located by some scholars somewhere on the Lech in Raetia. This notice is read in two ways. Castritius treats it with scepticism, observing that the name of the king may have been built from the ethnonym Semnones, and that the Lugii are otherwise absent from the record for nearly two centuries. (Note: Castritius notes that an inscription found at Augsburg in 1992 records the defeat of the Semnones/Juthungi by a Roman force in AD 260, and later conflicts in Raetia also involved groups from the Semnonic environment. He suggests that Zosimus may have confused these traditions, deriving the Lugian king Semnon from the tribal name and wrongly introducing the Lugii as Roman opponents.) Tausend, by contrast, takes the passage as the last witness to the Lugian league, noting that Zosimus elsewhere has Probus fight the Burgundiones and Vandali in the same region, which he reads as the constituent tribes of the same body.

== Religion ==
Tacitus reports that among the Naharvali a grove of ancient cult was shown. A priest in female dress presided, and the deities were said to correspond to Castor and Pollux, being named the Alci. There were no images, and nothing suggested a cult of foreign origin. The twin gods have traditionally been taken as Germanic, from Proto-Germanic *alhiz ~ *algiz ('elk') or *alh- ('protection'). Marek Olędzk identified the grove with Ptolemy's Límios álsos (Λίμιος ἄλσος) and placed it on Mount Ślęża.

Whether this cult bound the whole Lugian union is disputed. Castritius doubts that the meaning of the name alone makes the Lugii a cult-league, and thinks it unlikely that the cult of the Alci held the entire community together. Tausend, following Ludwig Schmidt, sees the sanctuary held by the Naharvali as the centre of the league, and draws a parallel with the Suebic cult of the Semnones.
