= Drusus' Germanic campaign =

Ancient Roman campaign

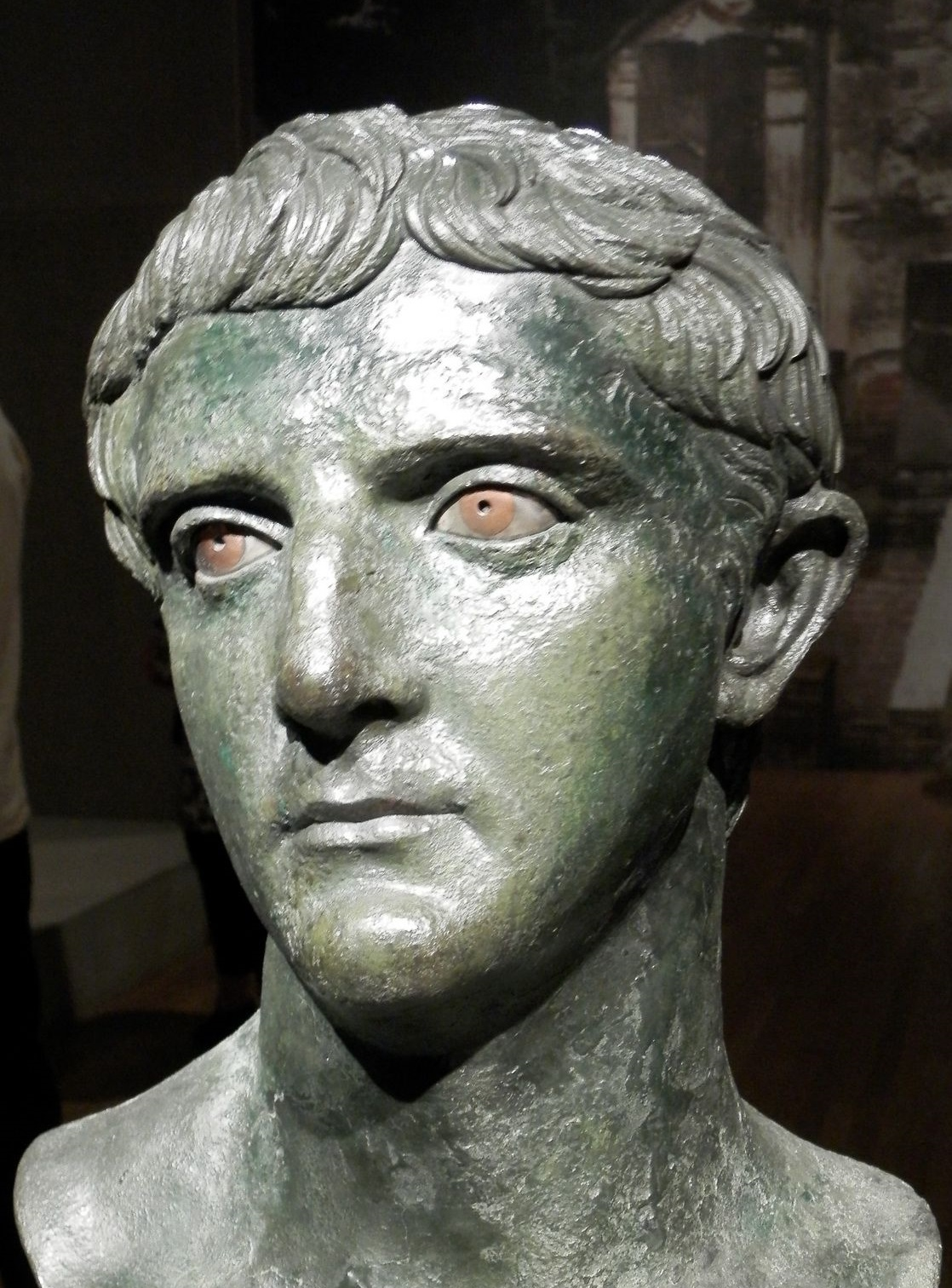
Bronze bust of Nero Claudius Drusus in the National Archaeological Museum, Naples.

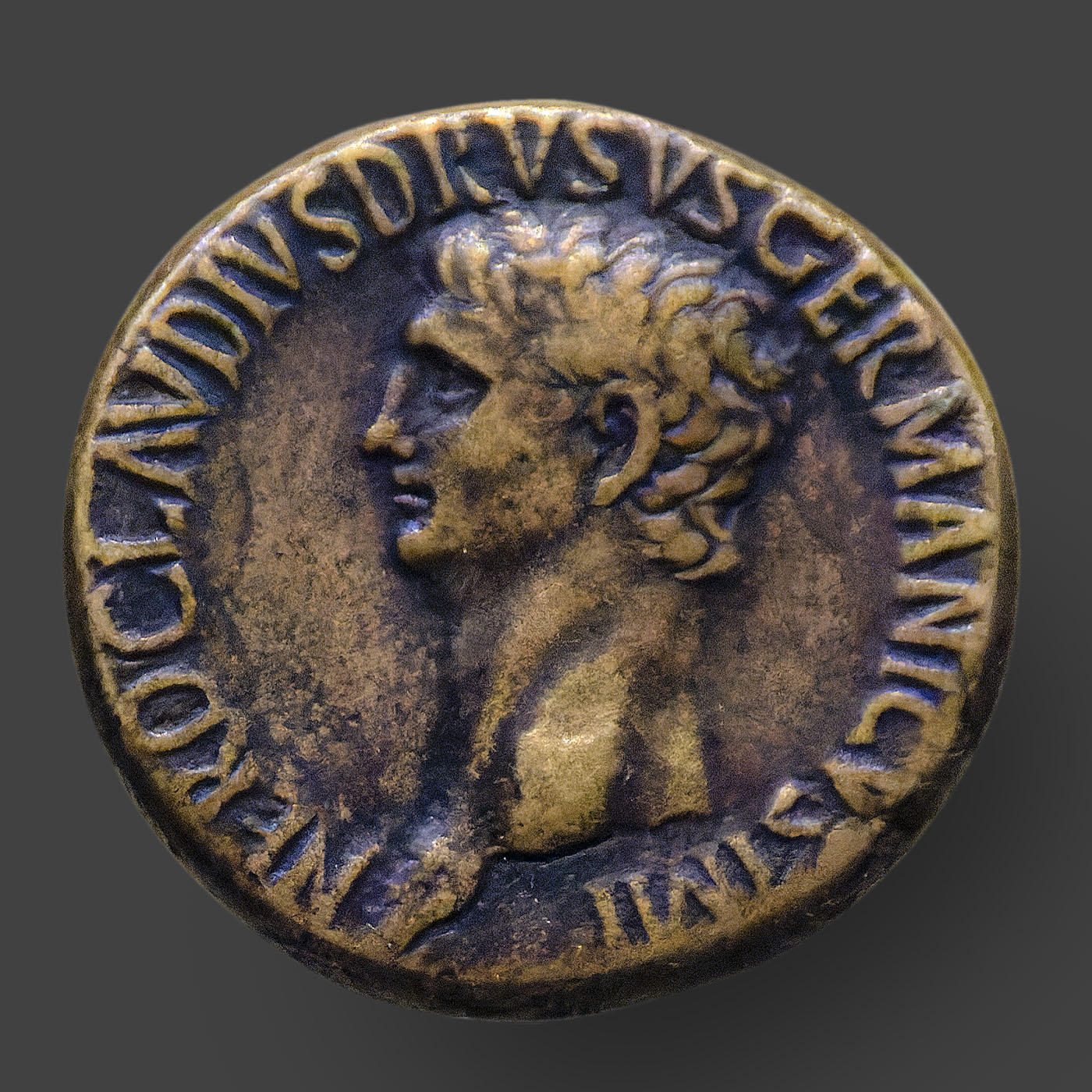
Sestertius of Nero Claudius Drusus, minted in Rome.

The Germanic campaigns of Drusus were a series of Roman military operations carried out between 12 and 8 BC against Germanic tribes located east of the Rhine River. These campaigns were led by Nero Claudius Drusus (born in 38 BC), the stepson of Emperor Augustus. Drusus commanded the Roman forces until his death in the fall of 9 BC, possibly from a fall from his horse.

The campaigns began in the late summer of 12 BC, with initial military actions in the Lippe region and along the North Sea coast. They concluded in 8 BC, after many Germanic tribes between the Rhine and the Elbe had been subdued (largely under the command of Drusus’ brother, Tiberius Claudius Nero). The high point of these campaigns came in 9 BC, when Drusus reached the Elbe River. These operations marked the beginning of the Augustan Germanic Wars, which continued for a total of 28 years.

== Prelude ==
=== Background ===
In 27 BC, Augustus became princeps (first citizen) of Rome and sent Agrippa to suppress uprisings in Gaul. During this unrest, weapons were smuggled into Gaul from across the Rhine in Germania to support the rebels. At that time, Rome had only a small military presence in the Rhineland, and its only operations there were limited punitive expeditions against raiding tribes. The Roman leadership prioritized stabilizing Gaul and eliminating resistance there. Once pacified, Gaul saw infrastructure improvements, including upgrades to the Roman road network carried out by Agrippa in 20 BC. Rome increased its military presence along the Rhine by constructing several forts between 19 and 17 BC. Augustus believed that the Empire’s prosperity depended on expanding its borders, and Germania became the next focus for Roman expansion.

In 17 or 16 BC, the Germanic tribes of the Sicambri, Usipetes, and Tencteri, captured and executed Roman soldiers east of the Rhine, then crossed the river and attacked a Roman cavalry unit. They unexpectedly encountered the Legio V Alaudae (5th Legion) under Marcus Lollius, defeated it, and captured its aquila (eagle standard). This defeat became known as the Clades Lolliana ("the disaster of Lollius"). In response, Augustus strengthened the Roman military presence in Gaul to prepare for future campaigns into Germania. A counterattack led by Lollius and Augustus forced the tribes to retreat and seek peace with Rome.

Nero Claudius Drusus, who had initially accompanied his brother Tiberius in campaigns, helped conquer the region of Rhaetia and the Alps, bringing modern-day Switzerland under Roman control. Drusus arrived in Gaul in late 15 BC to serve as legatus Augusti pro praetore (governor on behalf of Augustus with praetorian authority) over the three Gallic provinces. Drusus contributed to urban development in Gaul, including the introduction of a standard unit of measurement known as the pes Drusianus ("Drusian foot"), about 33.3 cm (13.1 in), which was used in places like Samarobriva (modern Amiens) and among the Tungri. Between 14 and 13 BC, Augustus himself was active in Gaul, spending time in Lugdunum (modern Lyon) and along the Rhine frontier. As governor, Drusus established his headquarters in Lugdunum and, sometime between 14 and 12 BC, created the concilium Galliarum (council of the Gallic provinces). This council would choose a priest each year to lead celebrations and honor Rome and Augustus as divine figures every August 1st at the Altar of the Three Gauls, which Drusus founded at Condate in 10 BC. That same day, his son Tiberius Claudius (the future Emperor Claudius) was born in Lugdunum.

The successful Alpine campaign secured the northern frontier of Italy and ensured safe passage between Italy and Gaul. Contrary to earlier scholarly interpretations, it was not intended as a preparatory step for Roman expansion into Germania. In fact, the southern German region played no significant role in Augustus' Germanic campaigns.

=== Rhine fortifications ===
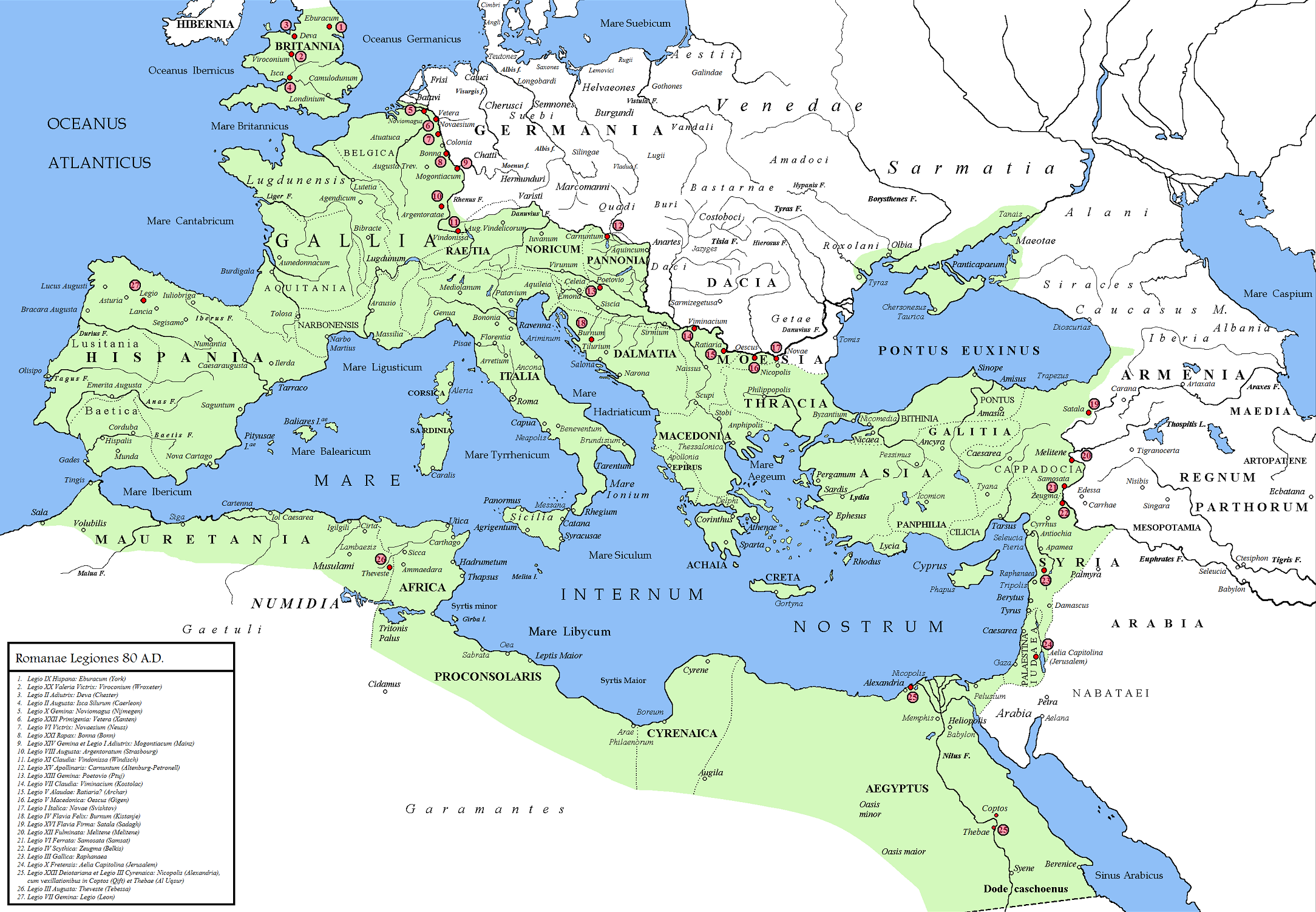
Map of all Roman castrae, including those built during the era of Drusus, in 80.

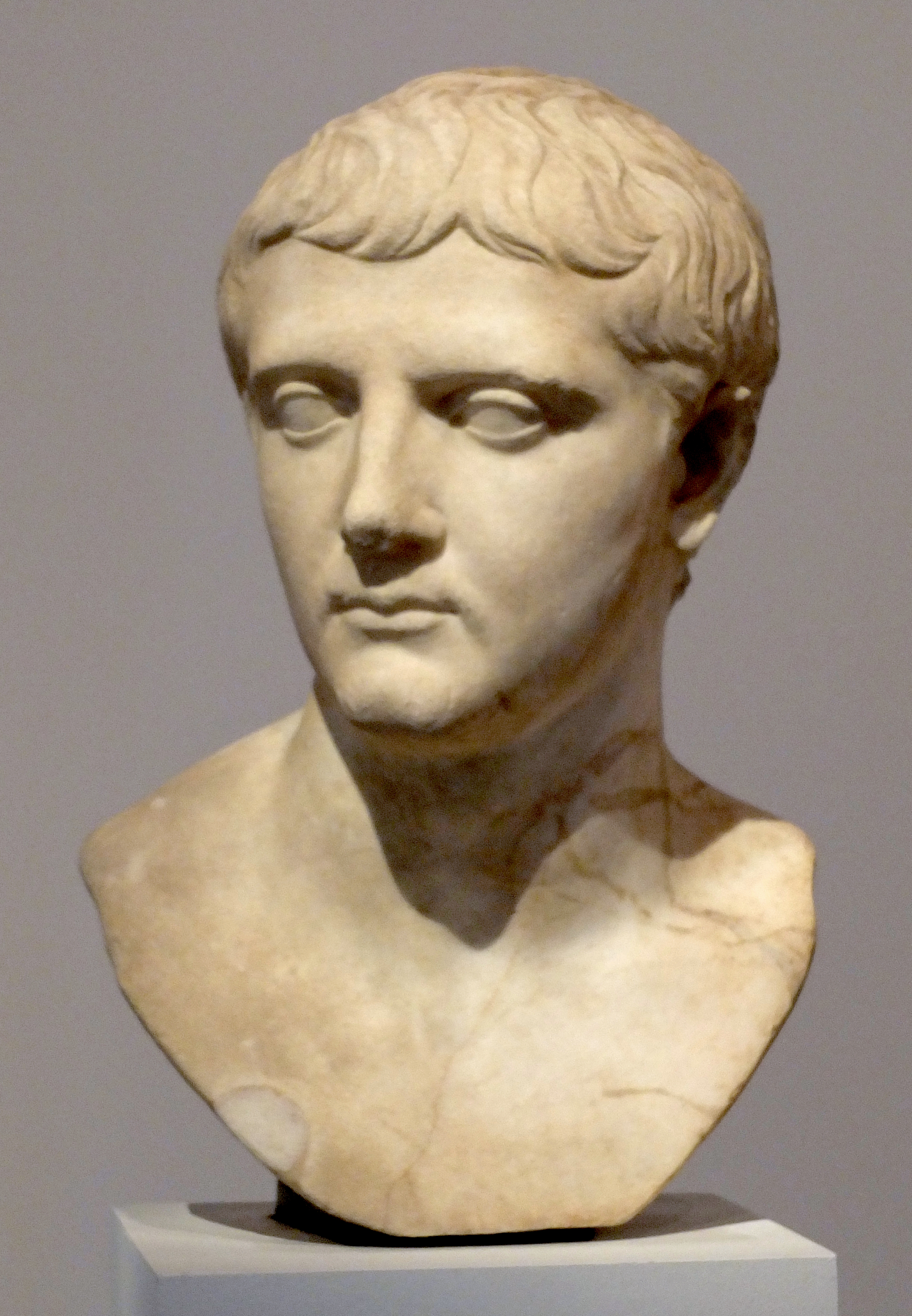
Bust of Nero Claudius Drusus, in the Capitoline Museums, Rome.

Following the Clades Lolliana, Augustus traveled to Gaul and remained there for about three years. During this time, major administrative and military reforms took place, along with a shift in Rome’s strategy toward Germania. The earlier approach, relying on allied border tribes, displays of strength, and retaliatory raids, had failed to stop Germanic incursions.

To better secure the region, the Romans constructed permanent military camps (castra) along the Rhine River. These included sites at Nijmegen (Ulpia Noviomagus Batavorum, probably already built by 19/18 BC), Neuss (Novaesium), Bonn (Castra Bonnensia), Moers-Asberg (Asciburgium), Xanten (Castra Vetera), and Mainz (Mogontiacum). These bases were strategically positioned: some lay along rivers like the Lippe, Ruhr, and Main, which led into the interior of Germania and allowed for offensive operations. Others were connected to well-developed Roman roads and waterways in Gaul, making it easy to supply the camps and rapidly deploy troops if trouble broke out. As of 14 BC, six new legions arrived from Gaul and Hispania, joining the two legions already stationed in the existing camps.

Despite these efforts, in 12 BC the Germanic tribes of the Sugambri, Usipetes, and Tencteri crossed the Rhine again, this time under the leadership of a war chief named Maelo. The outcome of this invasion is, however, unknown.

=== Opposing forces ===
The campaign likely involved approximately 8 Roman legions. According to historian Lindsay Powell, the 8 legions were the Legio I Germanica, the V Alaudae, the XIII Gemina, the XIV Gemina, the XVI Gallica, the XVII, the XVIII, and the XIX. Notably, the last three legions, XVII, XVIII, and XIX, would later be destroyed during the disastrous campaign under Varus in 9 AD. Historians Julio González and Ronald Syme suggest that these legions were specifically mobilized for the campaign in western Germania. Meanwhile, other legions, such as the Legio IX Hispana, the XIII Gemina, the XV Apollinaris and the XX Valeria Victrix, were redirected to the Illyrian front. Peter Kehne estimates that Drusus commanded approximately 25,000 troops during the Germanic campaign.

While the total number of Germanic warriors engaged in the conflict is uncertain, the individual strength of the tribes posed a considerable challenge to the Roman forces. Each tribe is estimated to have been capable of mobilizing at least 5,000 to 8,000 armed men. Estimates suggest the Germanic coalition numbered between 18,000 and 30,000 armed warriors just before the Battle of the Teutoburg Forest in 9 AD.

== War aims ==
The exact goals of Drusus’ campaigns are difficult to determine from the historical sources, partly because the Roman Senate no longer held open debates on such matters after the fall of the Republic. However, one clear objective was to punish the Sugambri and their allies. Another was to establish a zone of military and political control deep within Germania, which would help safeguard the province of Gaul. Historians continue to debate whether, as early as 12 BC, there were concrete plans to permanently occupy Germania or even turn it into a Roman province. The older theory that Augustus intended to shift the empire’s northern border to the Elbe River (supposedly to shorten Rome’s long frontier lines) is now considered outdated.

Augustus' personal ambitions may also have influenced the campaigns. The imperium (supreme command) granted to him by the Senate had to be renewed every five years (later, every ten) unlike his stepson Tiberius, who was later granted imperium for life. As a result, Augustus had a strong interest in presenting himself as the steady protector of the empire’s security. Germania offered the perfect materia gloriae ("opportunity for glory") for a ruling family that derived its legitimacy from military victories. The Germanic frontier also served as a proving ground where potential heirs to the throne could demonstrate their leadership and earn distinction.

== Campaign of 12 BC ==
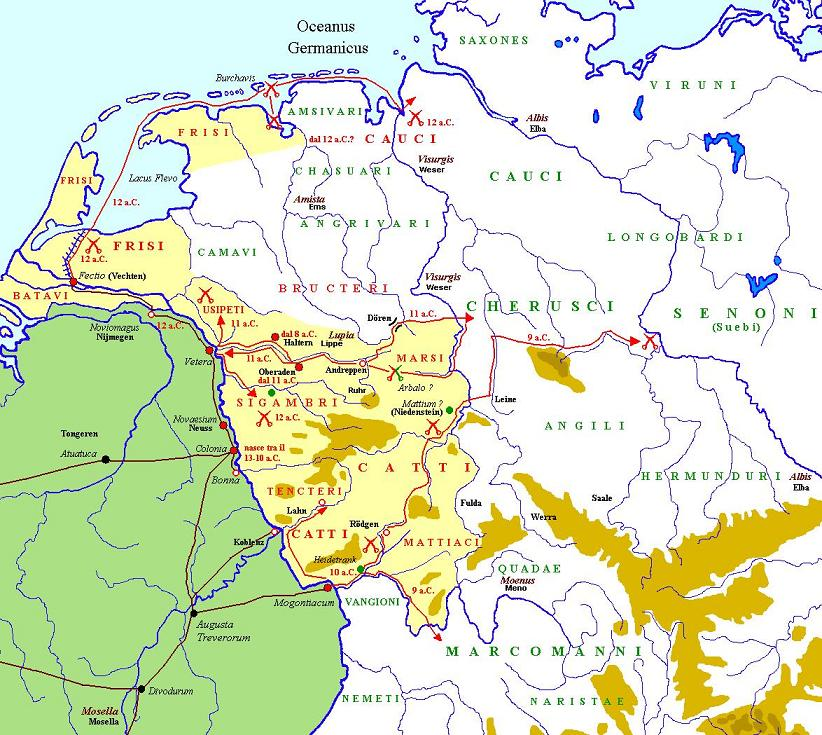
Map of Drusus' campaigns against the Germanic tribes, 12–9 BC.

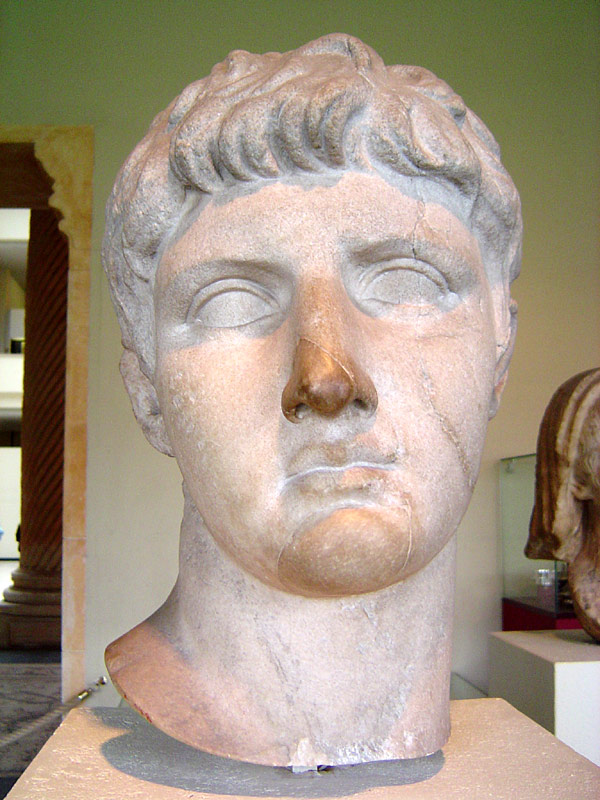
Bust of Drusus in the Museum of Art and History (Cinquantenaire Museum) in Brussels.

At the beginning of the campaign in the summer or 12 BC, Drusus crossed the Rhine with his army and launched an attack against the Usipetes, devastating their territory north of the Lippe River. From there, he advanced against the Sugambri, who lived between the Lippe and the Ruhr. Although there is no direct record of these tribes being formally subjugated, it's likely that many inhabitants fled deeper into Germania. Drusus employed a strategy similar to the one Julius Caesar had used in Gaul: rather than pursuing pitched battles, he aimed to destabilize resistant tribes by destroying their lands and livelihoods, thereby weakening the authority of local leaders who opposed Rome.

These early operations, especially the assaults on the Usipetes and Sugambri, can be seen as Rome’s standard response to earlier Germanic incursions, particularly the invasion led by the war chief Maelo. However, Drusus soon expanded his campaign beyond simple retaliation. Departing from the traditional model of punitive expeditions, he launched a major naval operation targeting tribes along the North Sea coast, many of whom had not previously been hostile to Rome.

Using a sizable fleet from the Classis Germanica (Rhine Fleet), Drusus' forces traveled from the Lower Rhine through the Fossa Drusiana (the Canal of Drusus) into the Lacus Flevo (modern Zuiderzee), and from there into the North Sea. The coastal Frisian tribe, situated between the Zuiderzee and the Ems River, surrendered without a fight. They agreed to pay a modest tribute and even offered military support to the Romans. The ancient historian Tacitus later notes it was an annual delivery of ox hides.

Continuing the campaign, the Romans conquered the island of Burchana, likely corresponding to modern-day Borkum, which at the time was significantly larger and included nearby islands such as Juist and Norderney, and then attacked the Chauci in present day Lower Saxony, who swore an oath to be allies of Rome for many years to come. As the fleet advanced along the Ems River, it was attacked by the Bructeri, who used small, primitive boats lacking sails or keels. These vessels were no match for Roman warships, and the Bructeri were decisively defeated. This marked the beginning of Roman naval dominance in the northern seas for years to come. However, after the battle, the Roman fleet ran aground and had to be rescued by their new Frisian allies.

This naval expedition wasn't only about conquest; it also served a reconnaissance purpose. According to the ancient geographer Strabo, these military operations helped expand Roman knowledge of the geography of Germania. Some scholars believe the fleet may have been searching for a river route connecting the coast to the interior, possibly to reach the Sugambri from another angle, a plan likely based on inaccurate geographic assumptions. The campaign season ended with the fleet returning to the Lower Rhine. Around this time, Drusus also secured an alliance with the Batavi, further strengthening his position and laying the groundwork for future campaigns into Germania Libera (the unconquered lands east of the Rhine). Afterwards, he returned to Rome, ready to launch another campaign for the following year.

== Campaign of 11 BC ==
=== Ambush at Arbalo ===
Drusus began his land campaign of 11 BC by targeting the Usipetes, who quickly submitted to Roman authority, with the Tencteri following suit. Following this, Roman forces undertook the construction of a complex bridge over the Lippe River, likely near modern-day Olfen. Ancient historian Cassius Dio briefly mentions this bridge in his otherwise concise account, which may hint at the logistical challenges involved in its construction. As the campaign advanced, the legions entered Sugambrian territory between the Lippe and Ruhr rivers, only to find it undefended. The Sugambrian warriors had marched south to confront the Chatti, hoping to pressure them into forming an anti-Roman alliance.

Up to that point, relations between the Chatti and Rome had remained relatively peaceful since the time of the Gallic Wars. In fact, as recently as 12 BC, the Chatti were the only tribe known to have refused participation in an alliance against Rome. However, the Sugambrian intervention appears to have shifted the dynamics. Some factions within the Chatti began to align themselves with Rome’s enemies, suggesting internal divisions and political realignment.

It’s possible that the Chatti were under the influence of the powerful Suebi tribe. If so, the Sugambrian campaign may have been intended to draw the Chatti away from Suebi control and bring them under Sugambrian influence instead.

After devastating the undefended Sugambri tribe and subjugating the Tencteri south of the Ruhr, the Roman legions continued their advance toward the Weser River. Their route may have followed the Westphalian Hellweg between the Lippe and Ruhr or possibly taken a more southern path along the Haarstrang Hellweg, passing south of the Teutoburg Forest and reaching the Weser near locations such as Hamelin, Höxter, Herstelle (city of Beverungen), or Hannoversch Münden.

The Weser itself was not crossed. According to Cassius Dio, Drusus decided to turn back due to supply concerns, the onset of winter, and a bad omen, a swarm of bees appearing in the Roman camp. Other sources also mention the bees, though not necessarily in relation to the Weser. Ancient historian Pliny the Elder notes that the bees settled in Drusus’ camp during the fighting at Arbalo and were seen as a favorable sign, given the Roman victory there. Livy recounts a similar story, and was reported by Julius Obsequens.

The return journey likely followed the same route as the advance for logistical reasons. During the march back, the legions were repeatedly attacked by the Sugambri, who had returned from their campaign against the Chatti. The Cherusci and elements of the Chatti may also have participated in these assaults.

At a location known as Arbalo (mentioned by Pliny) the Germanic tribes managed to trap the Roman forces in a narrow valley. However, their attack was poorly coordinated and premature, allowing the Romans to repel them and inflict significant losses. In the aftermath of the battle, Drusus was acclaimed imperator by his troops on the field. Augustus later revoked this honor and claimed it for himself.

=== Roman camp of Oberaden ===
On his return, Drusus had a large military camp constructed at the confluence of the Lupia River and the "Elison," which is likely the modern-day Seseke River. This camp has been identified as the Roman camp of Oberaden. Timber found at the site was dated to the late summer or autumn of 11 BC. The Oberaden camp was a massive fort with a heptagonal shape adapted to the terrain, measuring approximately 680 by 840 meters, covering around 56 hectares. It was large enough to accommodate at least two legions, with evidence of auxiliary units based on weapon finds. The camp featured extensive infrastructure: high-ranking officers lived in Roman-style villas, and permanent timber-framed houses and barracks were built for the rest of the troops. The commander’s residence, or praetorium, measured 41 by 59 meters and was likely reserved for Drusus himself.

Supplies for the camp, including wine and spices from India, were transported upstream along the Lippe from Xanten and unloaded at the Beckinghausen fort near modern-day Lünen. Although Oberaden hosted part of the army during the winter, it did not house the entire force. The fort’s position allowed control over the Sugambri to the south and the Usipetes to the west and north. Another Roman camp may have been established further south in the territory of the Chatti, possibly in the Lahn valley near the Rhine. Its exact location remains unidentified, but it is known to be separate from the Rödgen camp near modern-day Bad Nauheim. Further archeological evidence shows the construction of another camp in Hesse.

=== Provisional end of the war ===
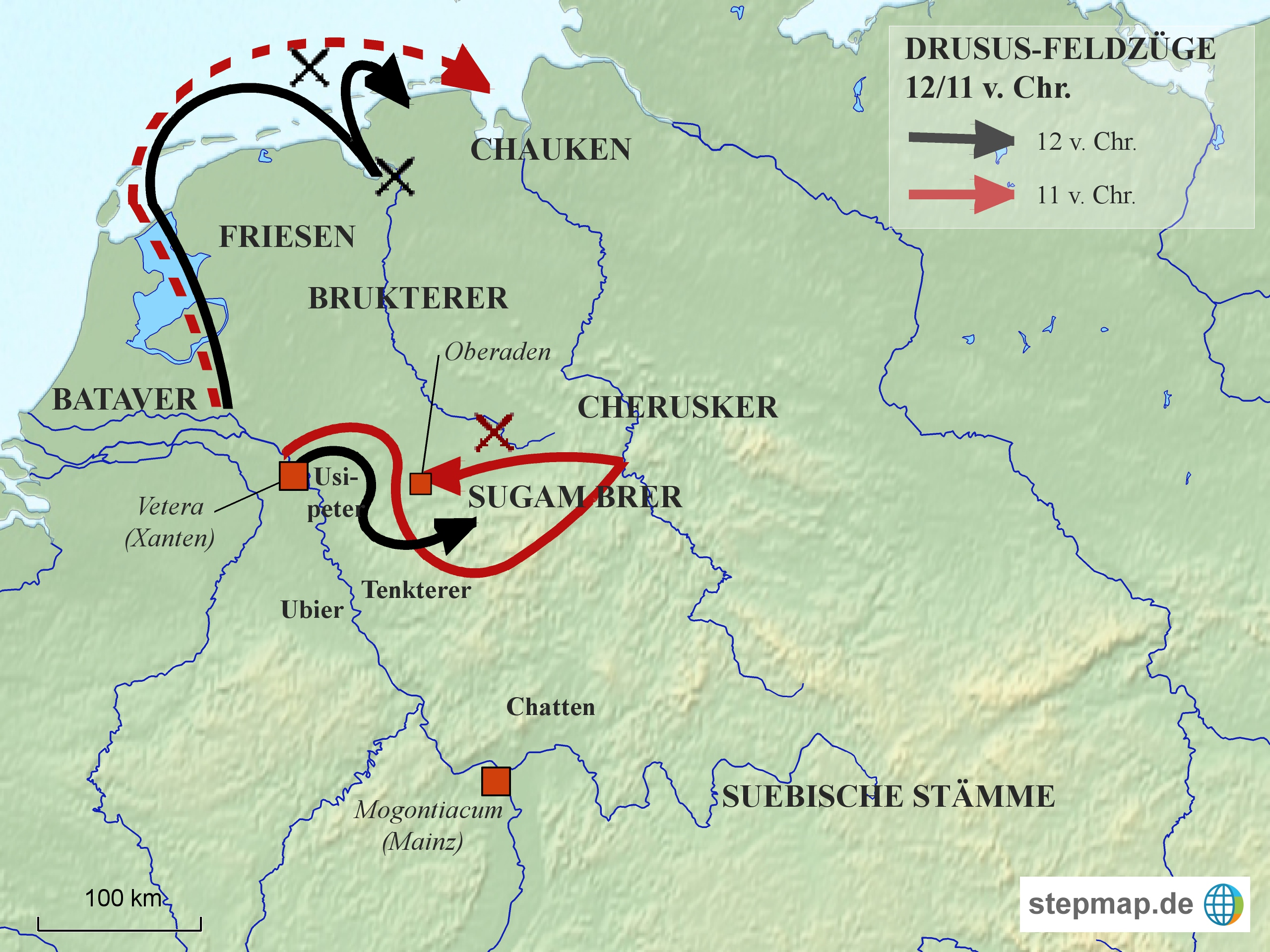
Map of Drusus' Germanic campaigns of 12/11 BC.

White marble of Augustus of Prima Porta, Vatican Museums.

Upon his return to Rome, Drusus expected to be awarded the newly introduced ornamenta triumphalia (triumphal insignia, a higher honor below the triumph) and an imperium proconsulare (proconsular command) for the following year. He was also awarded an ovatio (ovation, "small triumph"), but this was never carried out due to Drusus's early death. These honors suggest that not only the campaign had concluded, but that the war in Germania was, from the Roman perspective, considered over. The closure of the Temple of Janus, planned for 10 BC as a sign of peace throughout the empire, also indicates an end to the war. However, the closure did not take place because in the winter of 11/10 BC the Dacians invaded Pannonia across the frozen Danube and the Illyrians in Dalmatia rebelled against tribute collection. Tiberius was sent to the Balkans to resolve the situation.

On the Germanic theater of war, important goals could be considered achieved: the Germanic invasions into Gaul had been stopped; the Frisians, Bructeri, Chauci, Usipetes, and Tencteri had submitted and the Sugambri were militarily controlled by the Oberaden camp. Furthermore, the campaigns significantly expanded geographical knowledge, particularly about the waterways and the North Sea. These successes contrasted with the earlier close calls, such as the failed naval expedition in 12 BC and the near-disaster at the Battle of Arbalo. Augustus had become skeptical of Drusus's risky approach. Against this background, the emperor may have been interested in ending the Germanic campaign. The honors for Drusus may also have had the character of compensation for the "overly reckless military man."

== Campaign of 10 BC ==
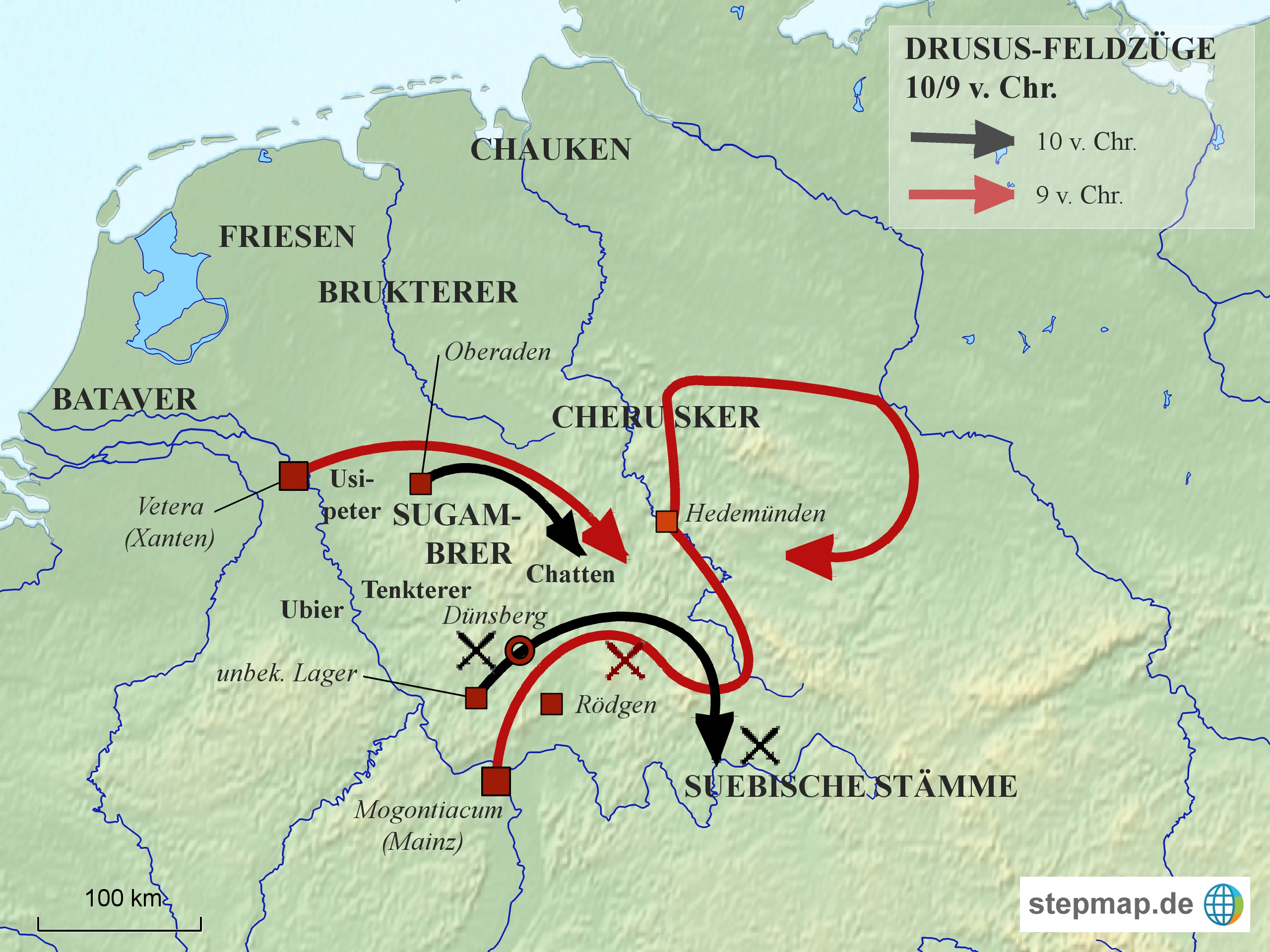
Map of Drusus' Germanic campaigns of 10/9 BC.

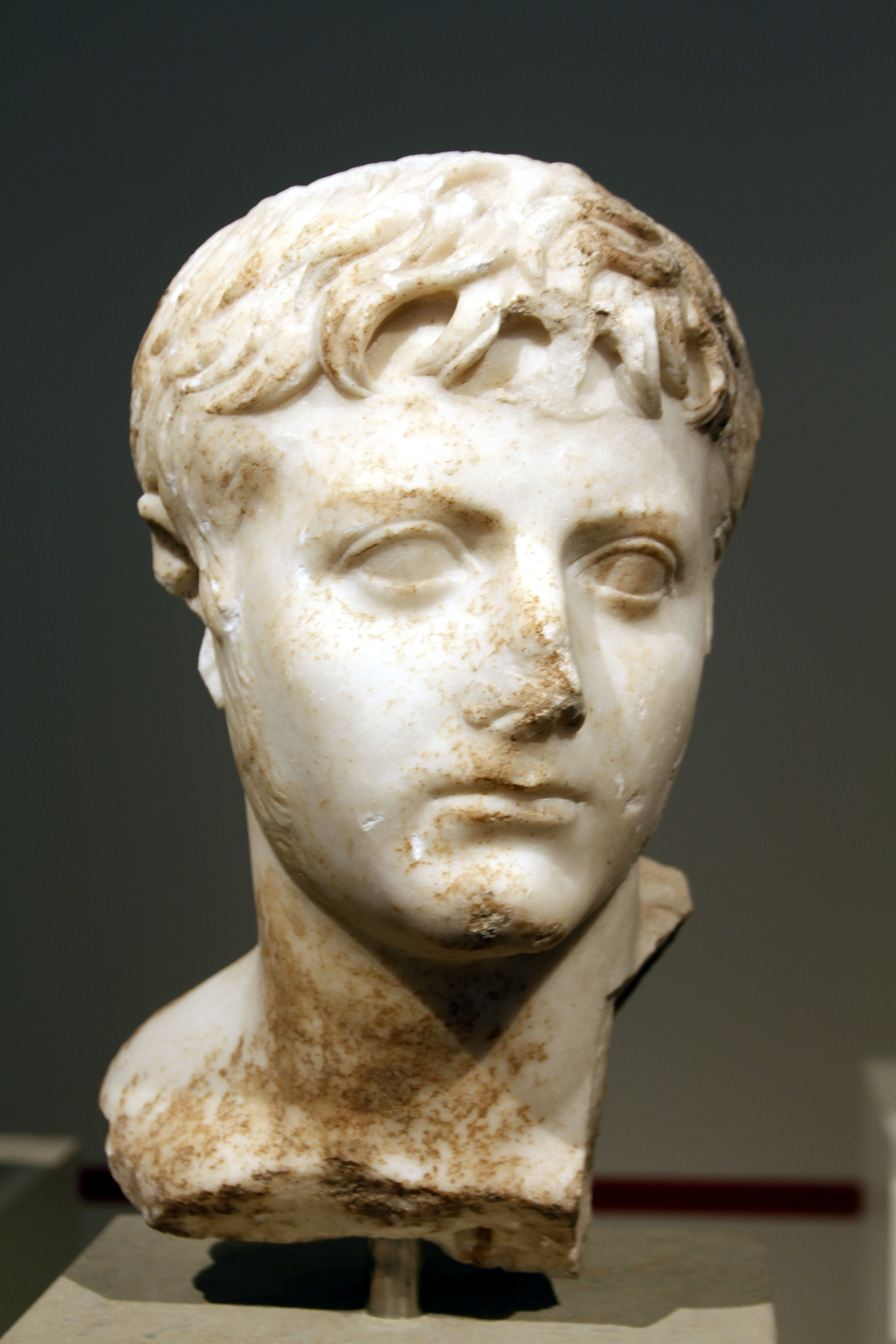
Bust of Drusus, Berlin, Germany.

The crisis in the Balkans and new developments in Germania forced Augustus to change his plans. After he had sent Tiberius against the Dacians, an appropriate field of activity had to be found for Drusus. Augustus attached importance to the equal treatment of his two stepsons. The right opportunity presented itself again in Germania: among the Chatti, an anti-Roman faction, likely supported by the Sugambri, took power around the turn of the year 11/10 BC. According to Cassius Dio, the tribe left the assigned settlement areas around the Main and Lahn and moved its residences further north, across the Eder, near the Sugambri. The construction of the fort in the Chatti territory in the autumn of 11 BC probably also contributed to the change in mood.

These military operations marked the beginning of the second phase of Drusus's campaigns. The new focus was further south. It began with a war of subjugation and devastation against the Sugambri and Chatti. Details are not known, but it can be assumed that the operations were carried out from the two camps that had been set up the previous year. The Chattian hilltop settlement on the Dünsberg was stormed, and this is suggested by finds of Roman missiles, particularly sling lead. Parts of the Chatti were forced to submit. Ancient historian Florus reports successful operations against the Suebi and Marcomanni. It is possible that the later Marcomannic king Maroboduus (Marbod) was sent to Rome as a hostage in connection with Suebian subjugations. Nevertheless, Drusus received an imperial acclamation for the year of the campaign, which Augustus left to him and did not transfer to himself as in the previous year.

The campaigns were supported by additional forts on the right bank of the Rhine. The Rödgen camp between the Lahn and the Lower Main had three large granaries and could store 3,000 to 4,000 tons of grain. From 10 BC, it served as part of the supply chain, which would extend to the Elbe the following year. The Dorlar camp on the Lahn was perhaps built in connection with the campaigns of 10 BC, near modern-day Hedemünden.

Researchers differ in their opinions on the success of the campaign year 10 BC. Older scholars' views, which claimed that the year 10 BC ended catastrophically with the military destruction of Oberaden, are now outdated. More recent research largely sees no catastrophe, but neither does it see a resounding success. Nevertheless, in the summer of 10 BC, Drusus left the field in order to return to Lugdunum, where he inaugurated the sanctuary of the Three Gaulish provinces at Condate on August 1st. Augustus and Tiberius were in Lugdunum for this occasion (when Drusus' youngest son Claudius was born), and afterwards Drusus accompanied them back to Rome.

== Campaign of 9 BC ==
=== Initial success ===
After winning the elections for consul in 9 BC, Drusus led three legions with auxiliary troops from Mainz, first against the Chatti and then against the Suebi. Cassius Dio reports considerable efforts and Roman losses. At the same time, a legate, probably with two legions, invaded the Sugambri region from Xanten. This operation is not recorded, but can be made plausible from the course of the war. The simultaneous operations isolated the enemy forces and increased the devastation. Furthermore, the legate secured Drusus's wide-ranging operations.

After his successes against the Suebi, Drusus turned north and crossed the Werra at Hedemünden, which Dio apparently considered the upper reaches of the Weser. The legions tried in vain to confront the Cherusci, who retreated into the forests or retreated to the east. A devastating campaign, perhaps already undertaken with the united army, remained without decisive battles and finally led Drusus as the first Roman general to reach the Elbe.

The Roman camp at Hedemünden ensured the army's supplies. The archaeological traces in the vicinity of the camp provide important clues to the Roman lines of movement. After crossing the Werra, the army moved northeastward down the Leine to the exit of the Leine valley. There, east-west connections allowed the northern bypass of the Harz Mountains and the advance to the Elbe, perhaps to the area around Barby.

=== Advance halted ===
The legions' advance stalled at the Elbe. Research suggests supply problems, flooding on the Elbe, or the fact that the limits of military feasibility had been reached. Cassius Dio reports that Drusus wanted to cross the river, but was persuaded to turn back by a "woman of superhuman size" with the following words: "Where do you actually want to go, insatiable Drusus? It is not destined for you to see all this. Go away! For the end of your deeds and your life is already near." The mysterious figure may have been a seer, possibly a Semnonian, whose tribe confronted the Romans near the Elbe. The veracity of the account is difficult to assess, since it contains elements of a topos intended to justify the general's turnaround and thus to cover up his failure. Not earthly problems, but supernatural forces commanded the hero to make an insurmountable "Halt!" The scene is reminiscent of Alexander the Great's turnaround at the Hyphasis, where the gods refused to grant him favorable omens for his continued march. Similarly, the ominous swarm of bees is said to have caused Drusus to turn back at the Weser in 11 BC.

In a parallel tradition by Suetonius, the great woman does not appear on the Elbe, but earlier, possibly during the persecution of the Cherusci. Her prophecy does not include the death of Drusus. Although Suetonius's version would fit the events well, scholars consider the information less credible because other errors have been proven to appear in this passage and, therefore, the described sequence of Drusus' offices is demonstrably incorrect.

=== Death of Drusus ===
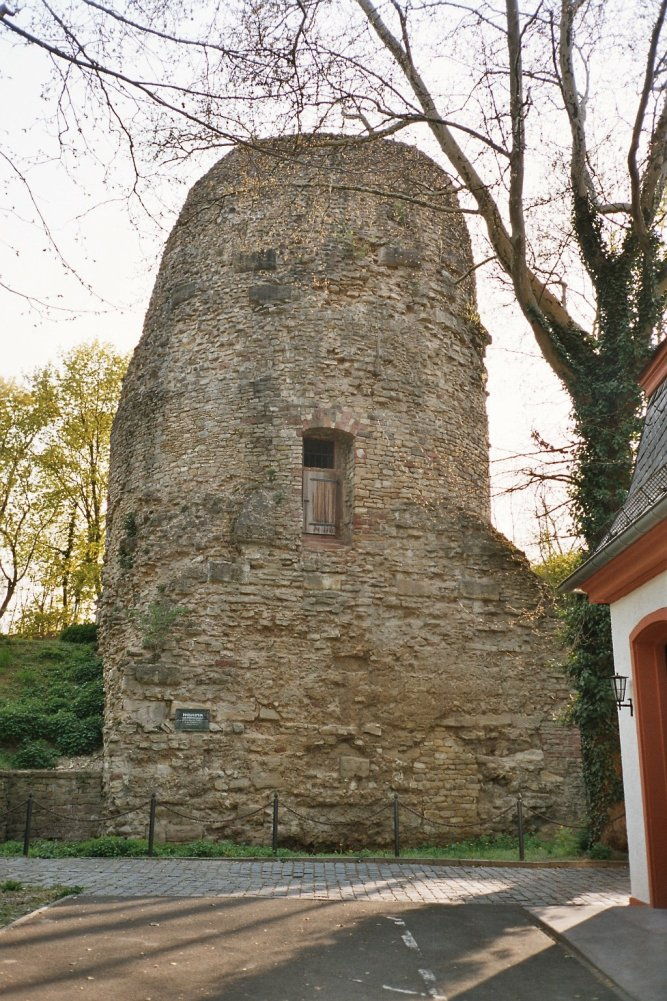
The Drususstein, the funerary monument in Mogontiacum (Mainz) erected by legionaries in Drusus' honor.

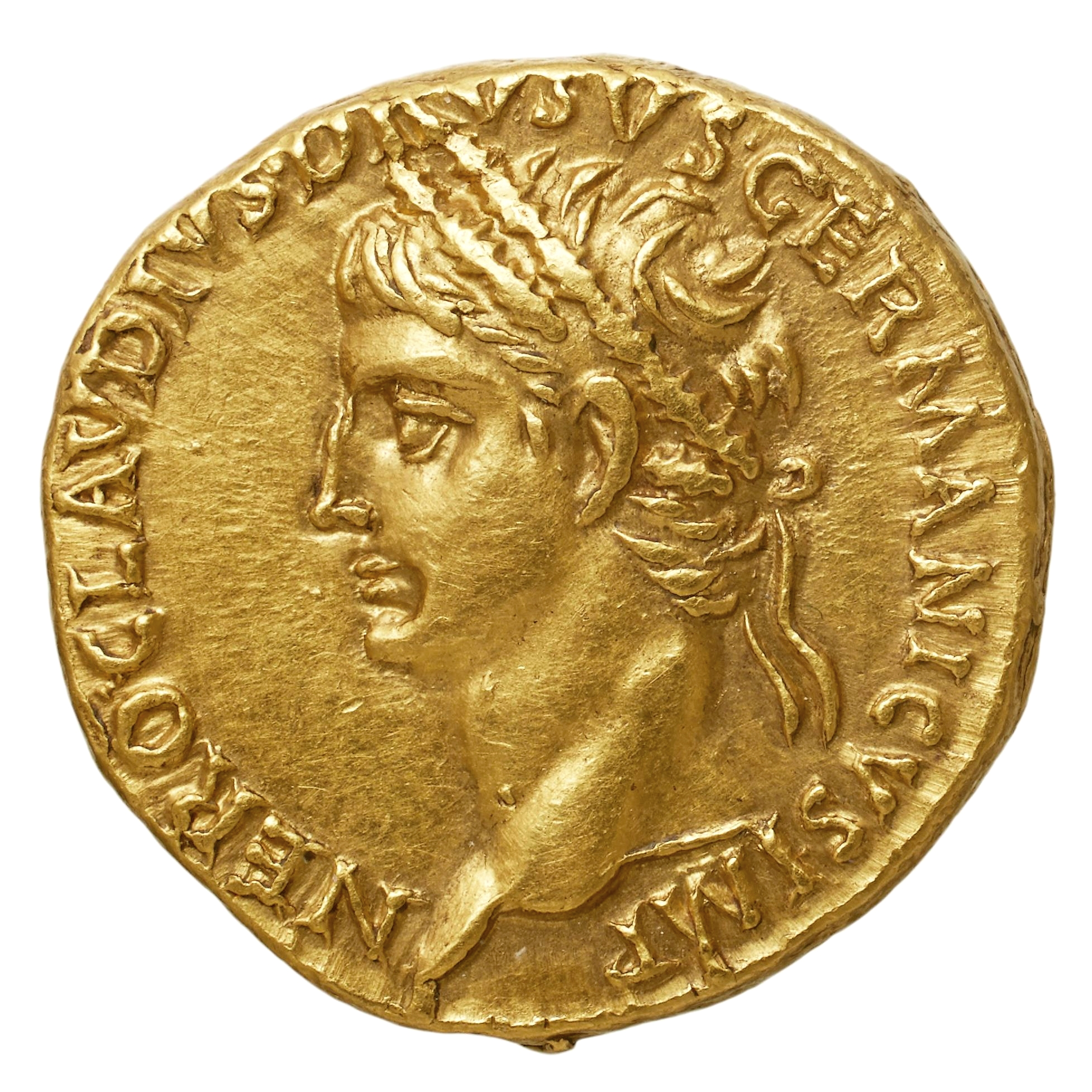
Coin depicting the head of Drusus wearing an oak wreath to the left.

The return journey initially led the army up the Elbe and Saale rivers. The plan was apparently to take a route along the Unstrut south past the Harz Mountains to Hedemünden and from there back to Mainz. At an unknown location between the Rhine and Saale, according to Strabo, presumably still in Cherusci territory, Drusus died "of a broken bone when his horse fell on its lower leg, thirty days after this accident," as Livy reports. Cassius Dio, Seneca, and Suetonius only report an illness, not a riding accident. If the cause was illness, then it would most likely be gangrene. This does not necessarily contradict Livy's account, but could refer to the infirmity following the accident. Strabo and Florus mention the death without giving any causes.

The legions interrupted their return march after the accident and set up a summer camp. Messengers hurried with the news of the disaster to Pavia, where Augustus and Tiberius were staying. Tiberius hurried to his brother's sickbed. The last leg to the summer camp, probably from Mainz, turned into a forced ride: Tiberius covered the 200 Roman miles (around 300 km) in just one day and one night and reached Drusus alive. This remarkable ride is not possible without numerous changes of horses and indicates a good military infrastructure even in the newly occupied territory. There must have been bases along the route, similar to those discovered near Hedemünden or the Sparrenberger Egge near Bielefeld. The existence of such posts sheds new light on a remark by Florus, who mentioned stations on the Elbe, Meuse, and Weser, as well as the existence of 50 Rhine forts. He may have been referring to chains of small forts, road stations, or posts in Germania.

The date of Drusus's death is unknown. According to recent research, the date 14 September, often mentioned in the past, refers to the death of Drusus Minor in 23 AD. Drusus probably succumbed to his injuries in September or October. The place of his death is also unknown. The so-called castra scelerata, according to Suetonius, ("unholy camp") was considered a cursed place, was never reactivated by the Romans, and has not yet been identified. Tiberius's remarkable 200-mile ride suggests that the site lay between the Werra and Saale rivers. The reference to a Drusus altar, which Germanicus, the son of Drusus, had restored in 16 AD after it had been destroyed by the Germanic tribes, is not suitable for localization. Because of the curse on the castra scelerata, the altar is not believed to have been at the site of the death camp.

According to Gustav Adolf Lehmann, the campaign of 9 BC "undoubtedly marks the culmination of the Germanic War led by Drusus." In fact, however, despite all efforts, the final success had eluded them. Germanic resistance seemed to have grown proportionally to the Roman commitment. It was not until the following year that Tiberius established Roman supremacy in large parts of western Germania magna.

== Campaigns of Tiberius in 8 BC ==
=== Overview ===
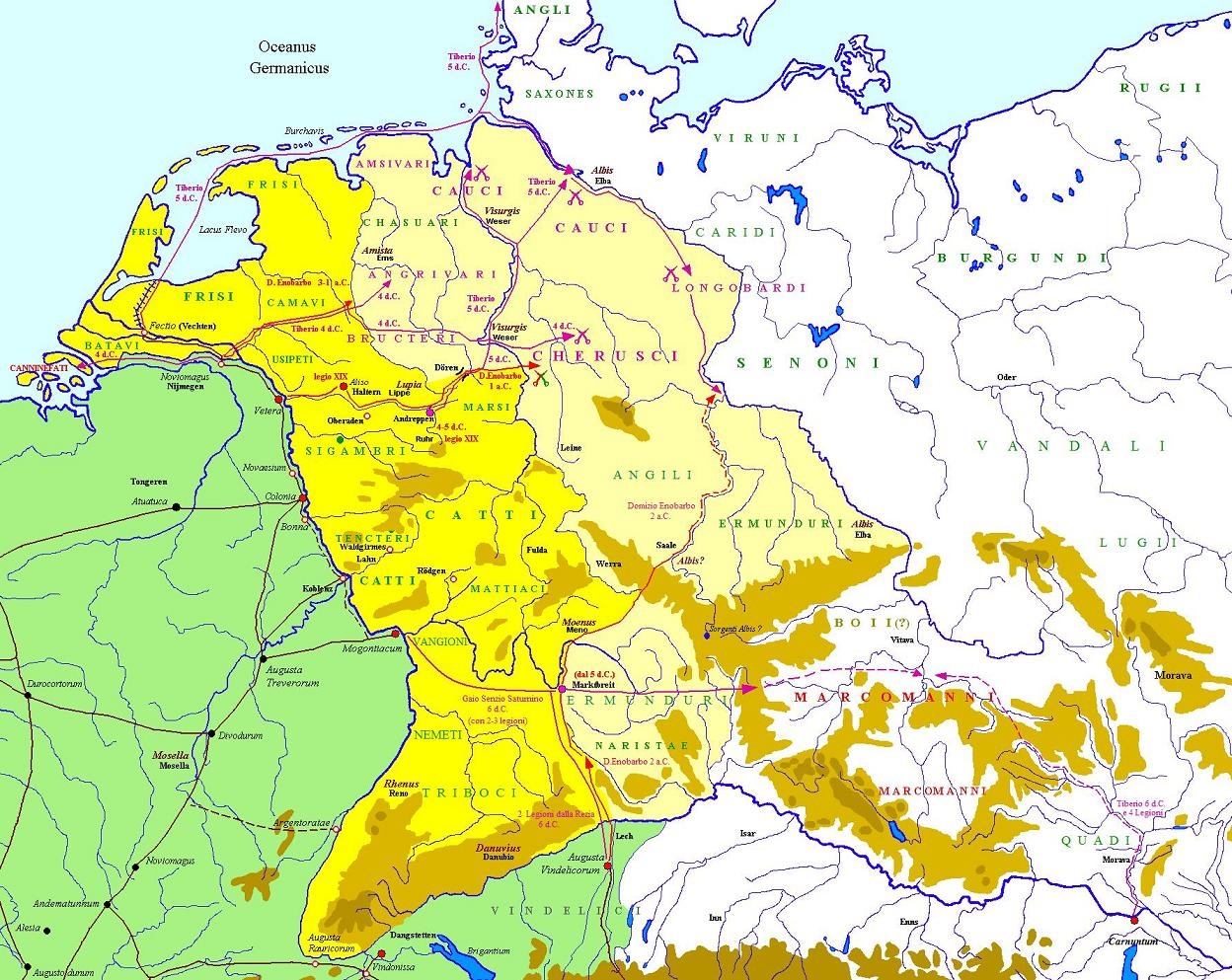
Campaigns of Tiberius and future camoaigns of Ahenobarbus.

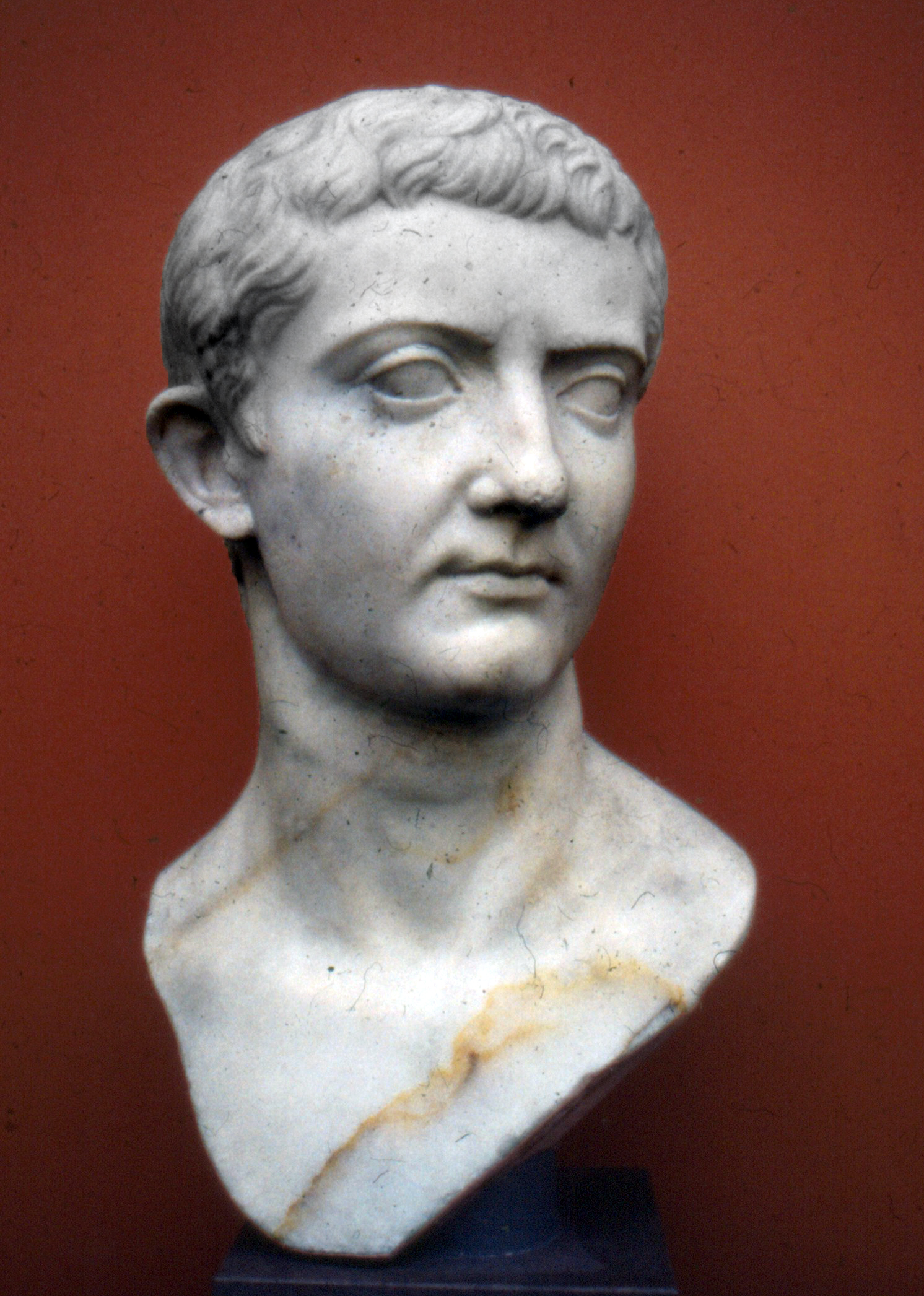
Bust of Tiberius Claudius Nero, the successor of Drusus in Germania.

Tiberius's command marked a distinct shift in Roman strategy. Gone were Drusus's often audacious military campaigns, replaced by a more politically focused approach. No military engagements are documented for 8 BC. Yet, within that year, Tiberius reportedly secured the submission of "all Germanic tribes between the Rhine and the Elbe" according to Cassiodorus, leading Velleius Paterculus to claim the region was left "almost as a tributary province." While these accounts likely overstate the geographical and political reach of Roman dominance, they do indicate a successful conclusion to the war from Rome's perspective. However, attributing the outcome of 8 BC solely to Drusus's efforts is problematic, as "Tiberius's success is based precisely on having broken with the approach of his predecessor."

=== Resettlement of the Sugambri ===
Probably in the spring of 8 BC, Augustus declined to negotiate with Germanic tribes seeking peace, insisting on the Sugambri's participation. This strategy effectively isolated the seemingly still-resistant tribe. Possibly influenced by their own allies, the Sugambri, according to Cassius Dio, eventually dispatched "a large number of distinguished men" as emissaries, who were, however, detained by the Romans, a breach of customary law, and subsequently died by suicide while in captivity. The removal of the anti-Roman Sugambrian leadership facilitated the rise of princes amenable to submission and Roman demands for resettlement. A significant portion of the tribe, Suetonius mentions 40,000 individuals, were settled on the left bank of the Rhine between Kleve and Krefeld. More recent scholarship suggests this resettlement was not necessarily forced, contrary to earlier assumptions. However, the continued presence of some Sugambri on the Rhine's right bank indicates a lack of unified tribal consensus. Under the observation of the legions stationed in Xanten, the resettled Sugambrian factions integrated with the local Germanic tribes and potentially with some resettled Suebi, eventually forming the tribe of the Cugerni. The fate of the Sugambri who remained east of the Rhine is unclear. They may have merged with the Usipetes and Tencteri, or persisted as the Gambrivii or Marsi. Cassius Dio recorded that approximately a decade later, during the Immensum bellum, they exacted "ample revenge for the disgraceful treatment" of their envoys.

=== Consequences among the tribes ===
Movement also occurred among other tribes east of the Rhine. The Suebi, Marcomanni and Quadi, led by Maroboduus, departed their settlements around the Main River and migrated to Bohemia. It remains uncertain whether this occurred with Roman consent or even support. The Chatti were likely returned to their originally designated territory around the Main and Lahn rivers. With the defeat of the Sugambri and the Suebian migration, the Chatti were now independent and would later become a significant Germanic adversary of Rome. The Usipetes and Tencteri likely expanded their territories, absorbing Sugambrian tribal elements and lands. Roman regulatory actions profoundly impacted Germanic tribal life. The Romans demanded tribute, provisions, and weapons, installed pro-Roman tribal leaders, and imposed restrictions on movement. Germanic warriors were conscripted into Roman service and deployed in various war zones across the empire.

The responsibility for maintaining order in Germania was entrusted to native auxiliary forces. These units served under the command of Roman officers or Germanic princes holding Roman citizenship, the most notable later example being the Cheruscan prince Arminius. An urbanization strategy, similar to that employed in Spain, led to the creation of settlement centers, now archaeologically evidenced by the Roman city of Waldgirmes on the Lahn River. These centers aimed to integrate the Germanic elite and attract the general population from their less accessible settlements.

== Consequences ==
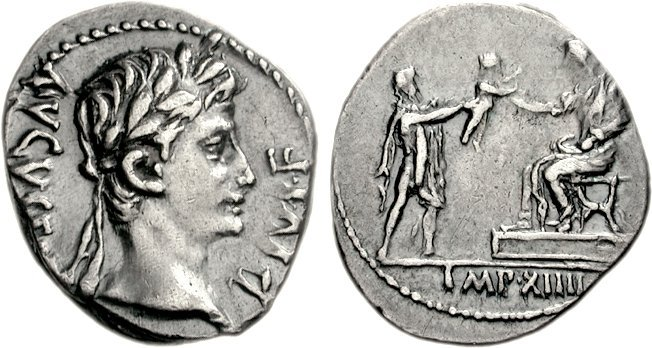
A barbarian hands over a child as a hostage to Augustus. This depiction may refer to the subjugation of the Sugambri in 8 BC.

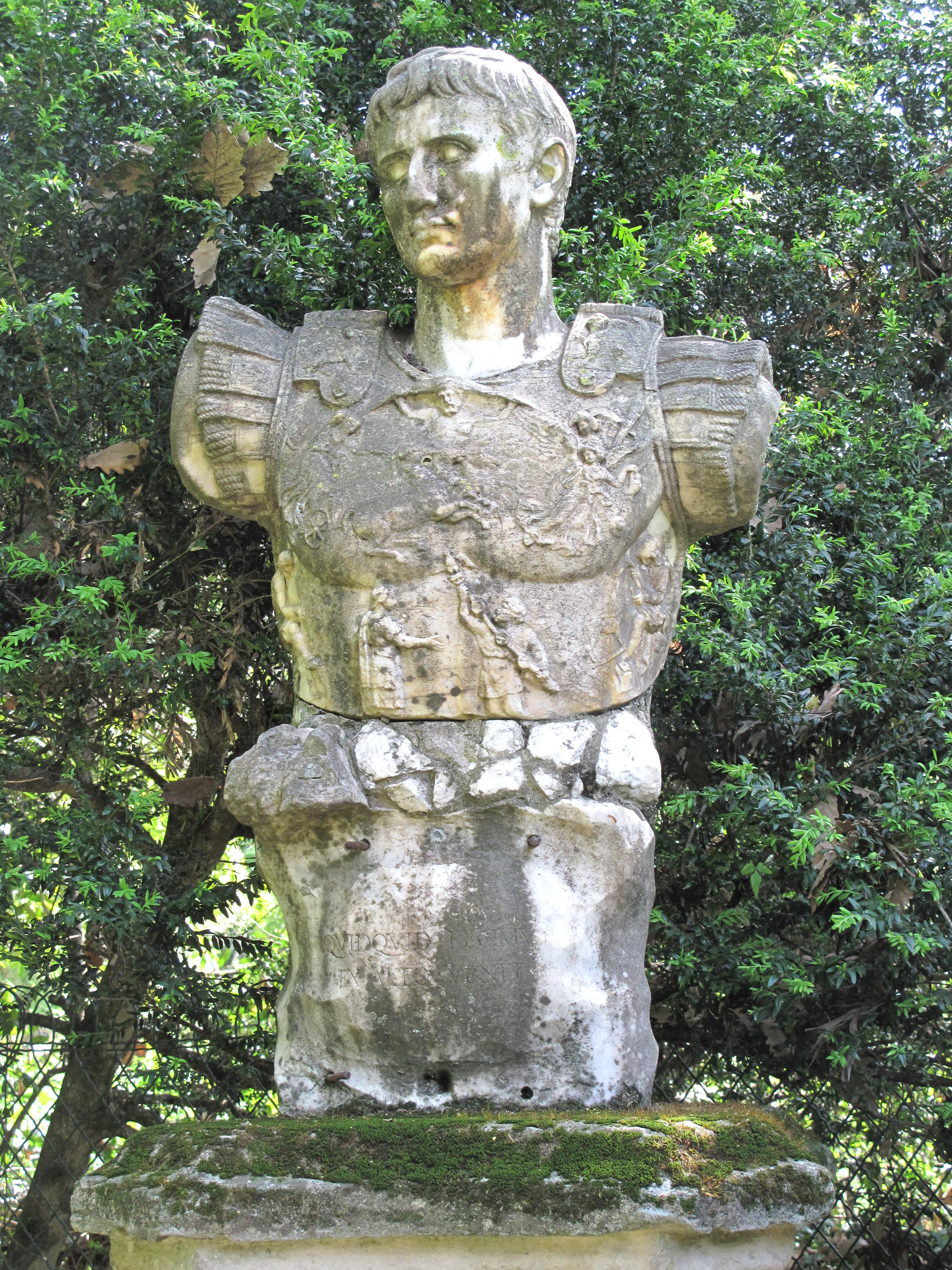
Statue of Augustus.

On January 1, 7 BC, Tiberius celebrated his triumph in Rome and began his second consulship. The expansion of the pomerium, Rome's sacred city boundary (a symbolic act signifying the empire's growth), explicitly acknowledged the conclusion of the Germanic War, adding "also a spatially relevant dimension." Coins were minted depicting the surrender of Germanic hostages to Augustus. The Roman military infrastructure east of the Rhine underwent significant changes: all of Drusus's former bases, including Oberaden in Bergkamen, Beckinghausen, and Rödgen, were abandoned in favor of new fortifications, such as Aliso, in Haltern. Drusus had sought out multiple Germanic (at least three) chieftains during his campaigns in Germany, engaging them in "dazzling displays of single combat." The sources are ambiguous, but suggest that he could have potentially taken the spolia opima from a Germanic king, thus becoming the fourth and final Roman to gain this honor.

From the Roman standpoint, the outcome of the nearly five-year conflict was positive: the threat of Germanic incursions into Gaul had been neutralized, the tribes' military strength diminished, and the legions' operational reach extended to the Elbe. The resettlement of the Sugambri had eliminated the most persistent and formidable adversary near the Rhine, and the withdrawal of the Marcomanni and Quadi eased the pressure from the Suebian tribes. The campaigns significantly broadened Roman geographical knowledge and opened up at least parts of the Germanic territories. However, a lasting pacification of the Germanic tribal world proved elusive. Uprisings in 7 BC, triggered by the radical nature of Roman policies, were swiftly suppressed by Tiberius.

== See also ==
- Roman conquest of Rhetia and the Alps
- Roman campaigns in Germania (12 BC – AD 16)
- Chronology of warfare between the Romans and Germanic peoples
- Germanic peoples
- Nero Claudius Drusus
- Germania Antiqua

== Sources ==
- Syme, Ronald (1933). "Some Notes on the Legions under Augustus". Journal of Roman Studies. 23. vol. XXIII. Cambridge, UK: 14–33. doi:10.2307/297202. JSTOR 297202.
- González, Julio R. (2003). Historia del las legiones romanas (in Spanish). Madrid: Signifer Libros. ISBN 8-493-12078-2.
- Powell, Lindsay (2011). Eager for Glory: The Untold Story of Drusus the Elder, Conqueror of Germania. Barnsley, South Yorkshire: Pen & Sword Military. ISBN 978-1-84884-333-2.
- Kehne, Peter (2008a). "Zur Strategie und Logistik römischer Vorstöße nach Germanien: Die Tiberiusfeldzüge der Jahre 4 und 5 n. Chr". In Kühlborn, Johann-Sebastian (ed.). Rom auf dem Weg nach Germanien. Geostrategie, Vormarschrouten und Logistik (in German). Mainz: Verlag Philipp von Zabern. ISBN 978-380-533931-5.
- Abdale, Jason R. (2016). Four Days in September: The Battle of Teutoburg. Barnsley, South Yorkshire: Pen & Sword Military. ISBN 978-1-4738-6085-8.
- Wells, Peter S. (2003). The Battle That Stopped Rome. London, UK; New York City, USA: W.W. Norton. ISBN 978-0-393-32643-7.
- Kehne, Peter (2002). Spielvogel, Jörg (ed.). "Limitierte Offensiven. Drusus, Tiberius und die Germanienpolitik im Dienste des augusteischen Prinzipats". Res Publica Reperta (in German). Stuttgart, Germany.
- Lehmann, Gustav Adolf (2011). Imperium und Barbaricum (in German). Vienna, Austria: Verlag der ÖAW. ISBN 978-3-7001-8842-1.
- Wolters, Reinhard (2008). Die Schlacht im Teutoburger Wald. Arminius, Varus und das römische Germanien (in German). Munich, Bavaria: Verlag C. H. Beck. ISBN 978-3-406-69995-5. JSTOR j.ctv1168qrj.
- Timpe, Dieter (1998). "Historisch". In Beck, Heinrich; Geuenich, Dieter; Steuer, Heiko (eds.). Reallexikon der Germanischen Altertumskunde (in German). Berlin, Germany: De Gruyter. ISBN 3-110-16383-7.
- Johne, Klaus-Peter (2006). Die Römer an der Elbe. Das Elbgebiet im geographischen Weltbild und politischen Bewusstsein der griechisch-römischen Antike (in German). Berlin, Germany: De Gruyer. ISBN 3-050-03445-9.
- Timpe, Dieter (2008). "Römische Geostrategie im Germanien der Okkupationszeit". In Kühlborn, Johann-Sebastian (ed.). Rom auf dem Weg nach Germanien. Geostrategie, Vormarschrouten und Logistik (in German). Mainz, Germany: Verlag Philipp von Zabern. ISBN 978-380-533931-5.
- Tausend, Klaus (2009). Im Inneren Germaniens. Beziehungen der germanischen Stämme vom 1. Jahrhundert v. Chr. bis zum 2. Jahrhundert n. Chr (in German). Vol. 25. Stuttgart, Germany: Franz Steiner Verlag. ISBN 978-3-050-03445-4.
- Lehmann, Gustav Adolf (2012). "Hedemünden und der althistorische Hintergrund. Die Ära der Drusus-Feldzüge". In Ders, Klaus Grote (ed.). Römerlager Hedemünden. Der augusteische Stützpunkt, seine Außenanlagen, seine Funde und Befunde. Dresden, Germany: Sandstein Kommunication. ISBN 978-3-515-09416-0.
- Wolters, Reinhard (2011). Die Römer in Germanien (Beck'sche Reihe) (in German). Munich, Bavaria: Verlag C. H. Beck. ISBN 978-3-406-44736-5.
- Kühlborn, Johann-Sebastian (2007). "Zwischen Herrschaftssicherung und Integration. Die Zeugnisse der Archäologie". In Wiegels, Rainer (ed.). Die Varusschlacht. Wendepunkt der Geschichte? (in German). Stuttgart, Germany: Theiss a Herder. ISBN 978-3-806-21760-5.
- Deininger, Jürgen (2002). "Germaniam pacare. Zur neueren Diskussion über die Strategie des Augustus gegenüber Germanien". Chiron (in German). Berlin, Germany.
- von Schnurbein, Siegmar (2000). "Augustus in Germanien. Archäologie der fehlgeschlagenen Eroberung". In Baltrusch, Ernst (ed.). 2000 Jahre Varusschlacht (in German). Berlin, Germany: De Gruyter. ISBN 3-110-28250-X.
- Kehne, Peter (2008b). "Zur Lokalisierung, Organisation und Geschichte des Cheruskerstammes". In Zelle, Michael (ed.). Terra incognita? Die nördlichen Mittelgebirge im Spannungsfeld römischer und germanischer Politik um Christi Geburt (in German). Mainz, Germany: Verlag Philipp Von Zabern. ISBN 978-3-805-33632-1.
- Moeller, Peter (1986). "Drusus (maior)". In Beck, Heinrich; Geuenich, Dieter; Steuer, Heiko (eds.). Reallexikon der Germanischen Altertumskunde (in German). Berlin, Germany: De Gruyter. ISBN 3-110-16383-7.
