= Immensum bellum =

Germanic campaigns of Tiberius
- Part of the Roman campaigns in Germania (12 BC – AD 16)
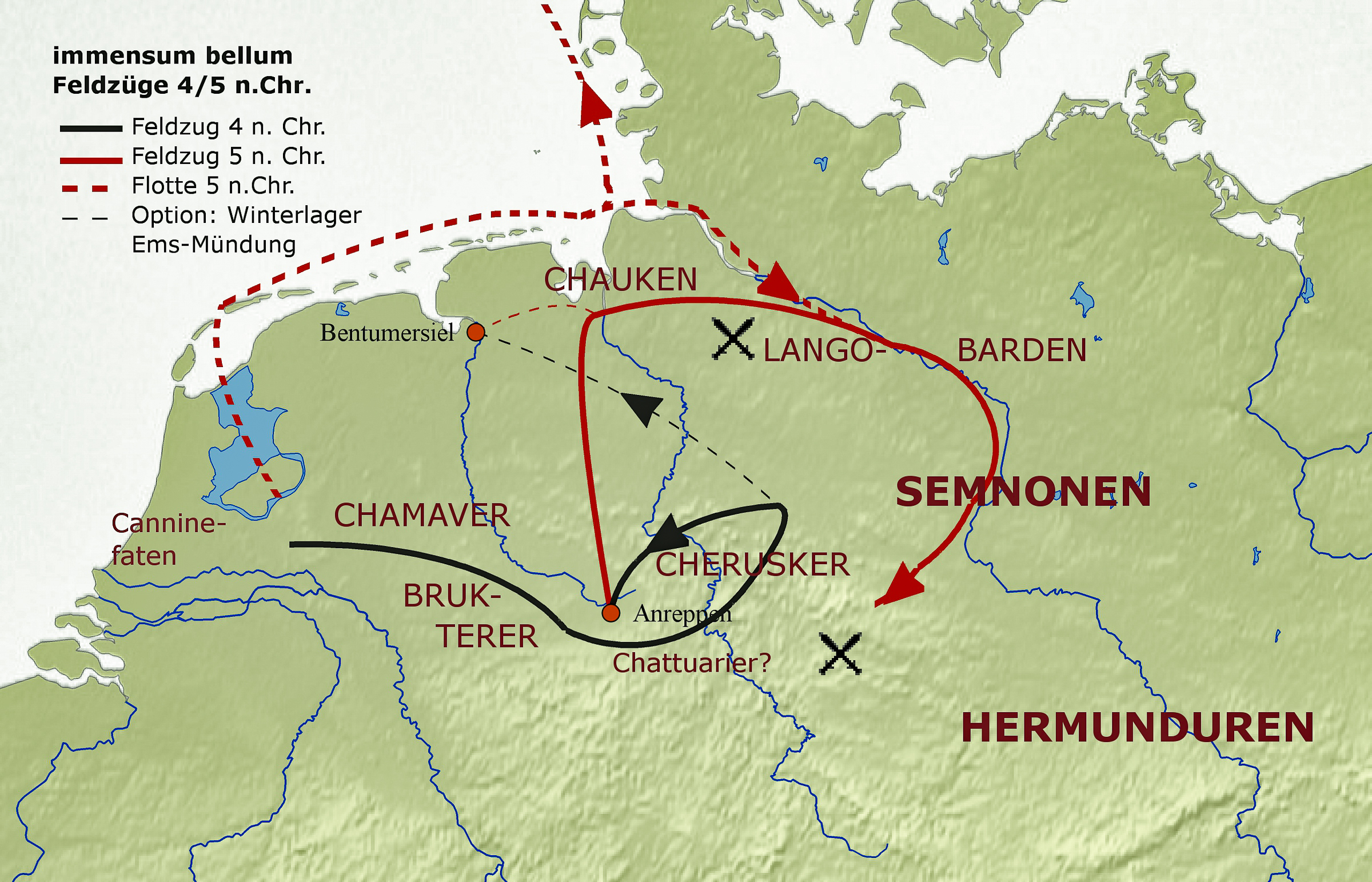
- The military operations of Tiberius, 4 and 5 AD.
| Date | 1–5 AD |
| Location | Germania, between the Rhine and the Elbe |
| Result | Roman victory: Increased provincialization of Germania |

Belligerents
| Roman Empire | Germanic tribes led by the Cherusci |

Commanders and leaders
| Marcus Vinicius (1–4 AD); Tiberius (4–5 AD) | Unknown |

The immensum bellum (Latin for "mighty war") was an armed uprising of Germanic tribes against Roman influence and exercise of power east of the Rhine. The revolt broke out in 1 AD under the governorship of Marcus Vinicius and ended with the renewed subjugation of the tribes in 4 and 5 AD by the designated Roman heir to the throne, Tiberius. The conflict is part of the Augustan Germanic Wars and the (ultimately futile) efforts by Rome to bring the area between the Rhine and the Elbe under the rule of the empire between 12 BC (beginning of Drusus' campaigns) and 16 AD (end of Germanicus' campaigns).

The term immensum bellum was coined by the Roman historian Velleius Paterculus. In the second book of his Roman History (Latin for "Historia Romana"), he reports on the outbreak of a massive war ("immensum exarserat bellum").

The available sources do not allow a reliable assessment of the severity and extent of the uprising. Nevertheless, the conflict is generally regarded by researchers as the "most important turning point in the [Roman] expansion phase between Drusus and Varus". As a result, the Romans increased their power in Germania. In 9 AD, the tribes again took up arms against the efforts of Publius Quinctilius Varus to make the area a Roman province, and inflicted the clades Variana ("Varian defeat", the Battle of the Teutoburg Forest) on the Romans.

== Sources ==
The sources do not provide any details about the first three years of the war under Vinicius. Only after the governor's replacement (probably in accordance with the schedule) in 3 or 4 AD and with the intervention of Tiberius in the summer of 4 AD does the tradition become more detailed. No Germanic princes or military leaders are mentioned.

The main source is the second book of the Historia Romana, chapters 104–107, by the war participant Velleius Paterculus. (Note: According to his own statement, Velleius served under the command of Tiberius from 4 AD, initially as cavalry prefect (See: Velleius Paterculus, II, 104, 3).) The description was written around two decades after the events and is characterized by great reverence for the general Tiberius and is therefore sometimes distorted. Geographical details are largely missing.

An extremely brief but important parallel tradition is available in the "Roman History" (Greek: 'Ῥωμαϊκὴ ἱστορία), Book 55, Chapters 10a and 28, by Cassius Dio. The historical work was written at the beginning of the 3rd century and is considered to be reliable and based on contemporary sources. However, the source that Cassius Dio used to describe the uprising probably had anti-Tiberian tendencies. (Note: Cassius Dio treated the uprising "presumably on the basis of a post-Tiberian (and accordingly tendentious) source". (See: Lehmann, Gustav Adolf (2011). Imperium und Barbaricum (in German). Vienna. p. 53, note 74.).)

Suetonius only touches on the conflict in his biography of Tiberius with a brief note (See: Suetonius, Tiberius, 16,1).

== Background ==
In the years 12 to 8 BC, first Nero Claudius Drusus (until 9 BC) and then Tiberius subjugated numerous tribes between the Rhine and the Elbe. However, a complete and lasting pacification of the tribal world was not achieved. Roman regulatory and infrastructure measures are recorded from 3 BC onwards. The Roman governor Domitius Ahenobarbus probably settled the tribe of the Hermunduri in the region of the Upper Main, crossed the Elbe with his troops, oversaw the expansion and construction of bases and roads (including the pontes longi) and settled internal Germanic disputes. Probably in 1 AD he tried in vain to return exiled members of the Cherusci tribe. The failure apparently exacerbated a crisis of authority among the Romans. When Ahenobarbus' governorship ended in the same year, he left his successor Vinicius a difficult legacy.

== Course of the campaign ==
=== Break out of the rebellion ===
In the year 1 AD, the immensum bellum broke out. The exact cause is unknown, but the failed repatriation of the Cherusci and the change of governor may have played a role. The rebellious tribes are not mentioned in the sources, but the later subjugations of the Chamavi (or Cananefates), Chattuarii, Bructeri, Cherusci and Chauci suggest that they were involved.

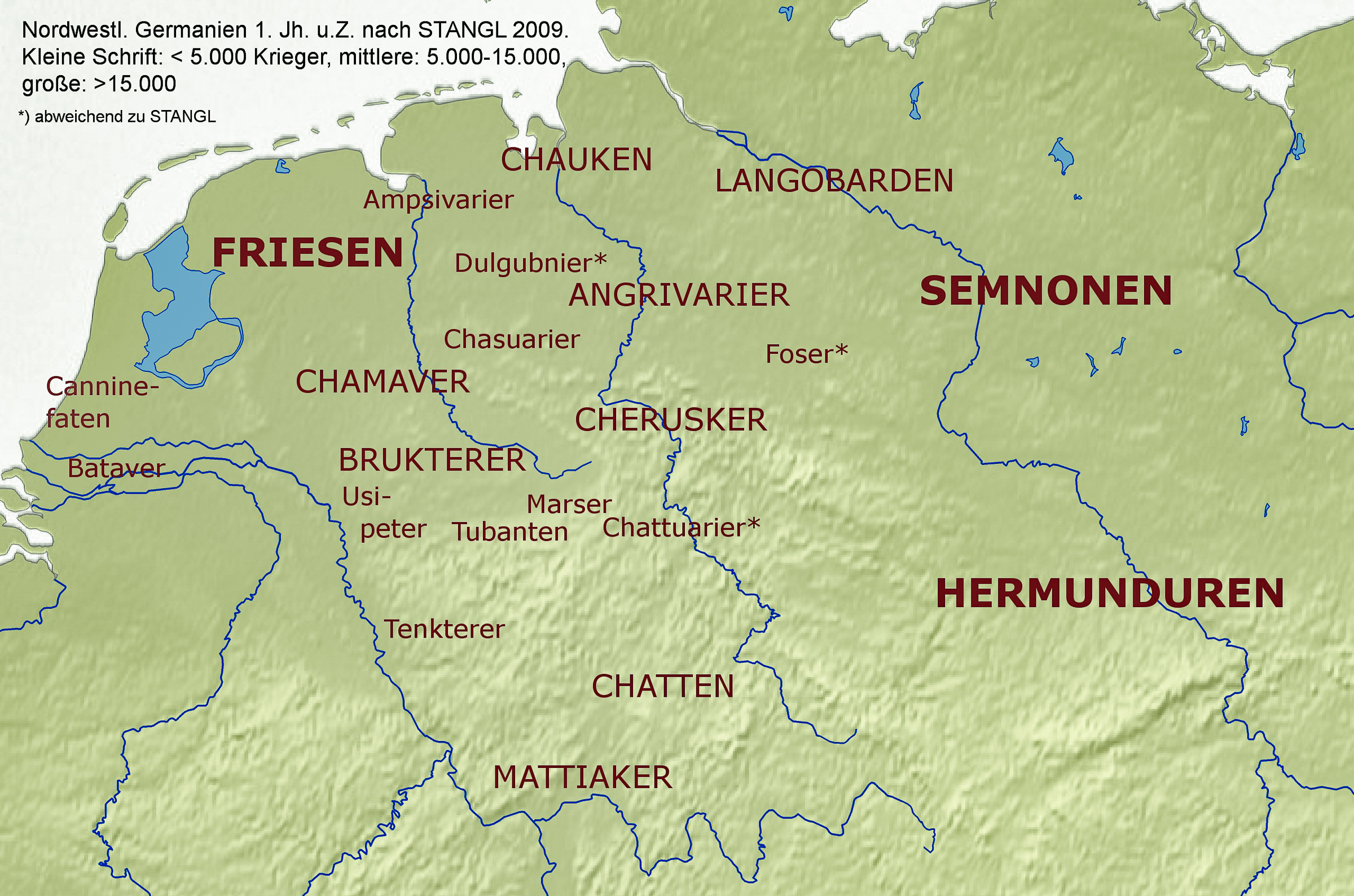
The Germanic tribes around the time of the immensum bellum.

The Germanic tribes around the time of the immensum bellum The participation of other tribes is uncertain. The Sugambri on the right bank of the Rhine may have used the opportunity to take revenge for the kidnapping of their envoys in 8 BC. Peter Kehne even considers it possible that the main source of unrest was the Sugambri. It is unclear whether the unmentioned Cananefates (or Chamavi), Batavians, Usipetes, Marsi, Tencteri and Tubantes stayed away from the uprising or surrendered to Vinicius. It must also remain uncertain which tribes "with an almost unknown name" translated by are meant, which Velleius reports as defeated. The confrontation with the Elbe Germanic tribes of the Lombards, Hermunduri and Semnones in the last year of the war does not necessarily indicate their initial participation in the uprising.

=== Campaign of years 1 to 3 AD ===
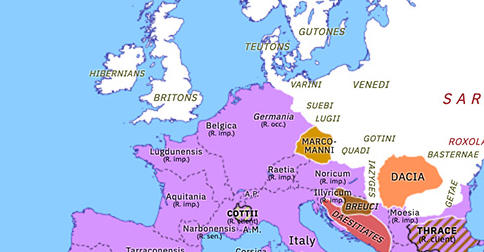
In 1 AD Augustus sent his stepson Tiberius to subdue the Germanic tribes on the Rhine frontier. In his campaigns, Tiberius eventually extended the Roman border as far as the Elbe but was forced to cancel plans to conquer the Suevic Marcomanni when revolt broke out in Illyria in 6 AD.

The military actions of the experienced general Vinicius in the years 1 to 3 AD are obscure. Velleius merely reports that the governor "led the war successfully in some areas, and stalled in others", for which he was awarded ornamenta triumphalia and a speciosissima inscriptio operum. Overall, researchers are cautious in their assessment of Vinicius' performance.

Historian Ronald Syme proposed that the historian of equestrian origin Velleius Paterculus owed his entry into the senate around 6–7 AD to the influence of Vinicius, who would therefore be configured as the patron, evidently in life, of the historian, who, moreover, dedicated his Historia Romana to his nephew of the same name.

=== Campaign in Autumn of 4 AD ===
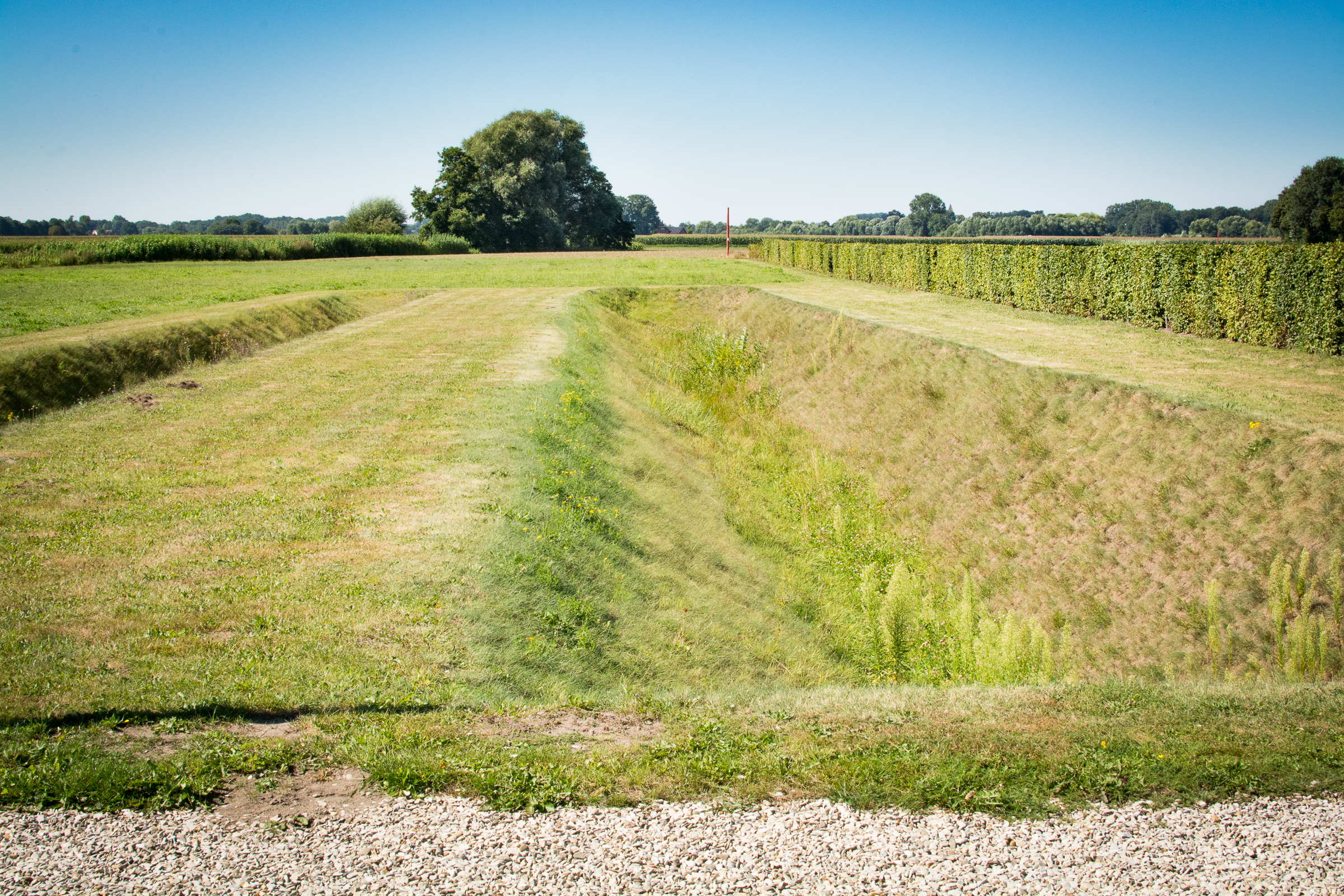
The Roman camp at Anreppen, here the partially reconstructed double ditch, which was probably the winter camp of Sentius' legion from 4 to 6 AD.

In the summer of 4 AD, (Note: The date is unknown, but it is after June 26, the day of the adoption of Tiberius by Augustus.) Tiberius hurried from Rome to the Gallic Channel coast to the naval base at Gesoriacum (Boulogne-sur-Mer), most likely to initiate naval operations. He then took over as commander-in-chief of the Rhenish legions and led the army into the interior of Germania at an unusually late time of year. At his side was the experienced commander Gaius Sentius Saturninus, the successor to Vinicius.

The focus of the military operations was initially directed against the Chamavi (or Cananefates), Chattuarii and Bructeri, who were subjugated (subacti). Tiberius then reinstated the Cherusci into the Roman system of rule (recepti) and crossed the Weser. The military actions continued until December. Here the entire army set up a winter camp in the middle of Germania, probably in the Roman camp of Anreppen not far from the Lippe springs, which served as an important base for the subsequent campaigns.

In the year 4 AD, an exploratory fleet may also have set sail for the Jutland peninsula (today Denmark). Although researchers generally assign this voyage to the major naval operation the following year, there are indications that the expedition's findings were already incorporated into the planning for the campaign year 5 AD and that the exploratory voyage should therefore be scheduled earlier. The Wilkenburg marching camp near Hanover, which has been researched since 2015, could also be related to the campaigns of the years 4 and 5 AD.

=== Campaign of 5 AD ===
In the campaign year 5 AD, the legions initially forced the Chauci back into dependence on Rome (receptae). Afterwards, a Roman victory (fracti) broke the resistance of the Lombards on the left bank of the Elbe. However, the tribe was able to avoid subjugation by retreating (archaeologically verifiable) to territory on the right bank of the Elbe.

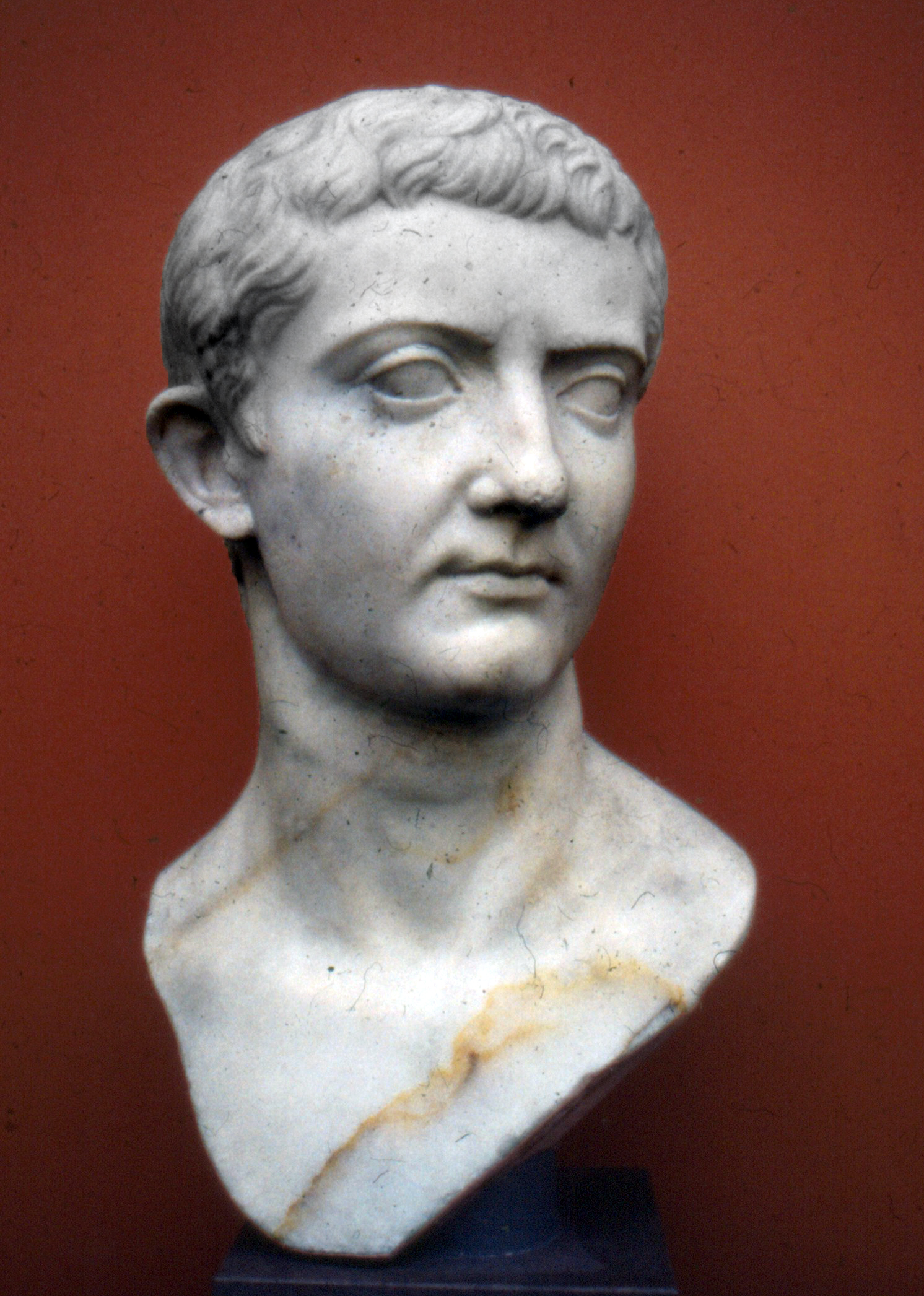
Bust of Tiberius.

Finally, the legions united with the Roman fleet that had advanced up the Elbe. The apparently perfectly coordinated maneuver is "admirable and represents without a doubt the high point of the Roman Germanic campaigns". Suggestions for the location of the meeting point range from the Lower Elbe to the area of the Hermunduri. The fleet had probably already been involved in the operations against the Chauci and Lombards. In connection with the fleet, Velleius reports "a victory over numerous peoples" but this cannot be linked with certainty to the campaign against the Chauci and Lombards.

There were no fightings on the Elbe. The Semnones, Hermunduri and Lombards, (Note: The alliance membership of the Lombards is not certain (See: Tausend, Klaus (2009). Im Inneren Germaniens. Beziehungen der germanischen Stämme vom 1. Jahrhundert v. Chr. bis zum 2. Jahrhundert n. Chr. Vol. 25. Stuttgart. p. 23.).) who had formed an alliance, had retreated to the right bank and were waiting. The Romans were bound by a ban on crossing the Elbe imposed by Augustus.

In this situation, Velleius reports on the difficult-to-interpret visit of an "older barbarian" to Tiberius' camp. The German, probably a prince, first steered a dugout canoe to the middle of the river and asked to be allowed to see Tiberius, which was granted. Standing before the general, he initially expressed incomprehension about the behavior of his Germanic compatriots: "Truly mad are our youth, who respect your will when you are not there, but when you are there, prefer to fear your weapons than to seek your protection", Velleius has him say. Then he thanked them for being allowed to see "the gods", described the day as the happiest of his life and took Tiberius' hand. Finally, constantly looking around, he rowed back. Research suggests a panegyric (flattering) exaltation of Tiberius by Velleius or the initiation of negotiations by a Germanic prince.

On the march back to the Rhine, the legions had to fend off an unspecified attack. Apparently, despite the impressive Roman demonstration of power, Germania was not completely pacified. Nevertheless, with the conclusion of the campaign, the previous order could be considered restored and the immensum bellum ended.

== Consequences ==
By the war year 5 AD at the latest, the Romans were seriously attempting to seize the Elbe border. In order to draw this border, however, it was necessary to eliminate or subdue the powerful empire of the Marcomanni under their king Maroboduus, which was located in Bohemia and on both sides of the Elbe. According to Velleius, there was "nothing more to defeat in Germania than the people of the Marcomanni". In 6 AD, Tiberius led 12 legions, one of the largest armies the empire had ever mustered, into Maroboduus's Bohemian core area. However, the attack had to be aborted due to the onset of the Pannonian uprising.

The ambassadors he sent to the Caesars sometimes recommended him as if he were a suppliant, sometimes they spoke of him as if he were an equal. Tribes and individuals who had defected from us found refuge with him. On the whole, he (Marbod) behaved, which he only poorly concealed, as a rival of Rome. He trained his (Marbod's) army, which he had brought up to the strength of 70,000 foot soldiers and 4,000 horsemen, in constant wars against the neighboring peoples and thus prepared it for a greater task than the present one.

— Velleius Paterculus, II, 109, 2

Between the Rhine and the Elbe, the Romans increased their efforts to make the area a Roman province. The construction and expansion of the infrastructure on the right bank of the Rhine reached a peak during and after the war. Not least because of the "intensified pace" Cassius Dio reports that Varus was keen to "completely transform the Germanic tribes more quickly; he generally gave them orders as if they were already living in slavery and collected tribute from them (...); they could no longer bear this treatment". of Saturninus' successor Varus (governor from 7 to 9 AD) in the provincialization measures (tax collection, military presence and, above all, jurisdiction) the Germanic tribes again took up arms. Four years after the end of the immensum bellum , a new uprising broke out with the Battle of the Teutoburg Forest, the devastating defeat suffered by Varus against the rebellious Germanic tribes under Arminius.

== Sources ==
- Cassius Dio. Historiae Romanae (in Ancient Greek). book 55, chapters 10a–28. (Greek text here and English translation here).
- Velleius Paterculus. Historia Romana (in Latin). book 2, chapters 104–107.
- Suetonius. De vita Caesarum (in Latin). (Latin text here and Italian translation here).

== Literature ==
- Johne, Klaus-Peter (2006). Die Römer an der Elbe. Das Stromgebiet der Elbe im geographischen Weltbild und im politischen Bewusstsein der griechisch-römischen Antike (in German). Berlin.
- Becker, Armin (1992). Rom und die Chatten (in German). Darmstadt.
- Kehne, Peter (2008). Zelle, Michael (ed.). "Zur Lokalisierung, Organisation und Geschichte des Cheruskerstammes". Terra Incognita? (in German). Mainz.
- Goetz, Hans-Werner; Welwei, Karl-Wilhelm (1995). Altes Germanien. Auszüge aus den antiken Quellen über die Germanen und ihre Beziehungen zum römischen Reich (in German). Darmstadt.
- Syme, Ronald (August 8, 2002) [1939]. The Roman revolution. OUP Oxford, Clarendon Press.
