= Hedemünden =

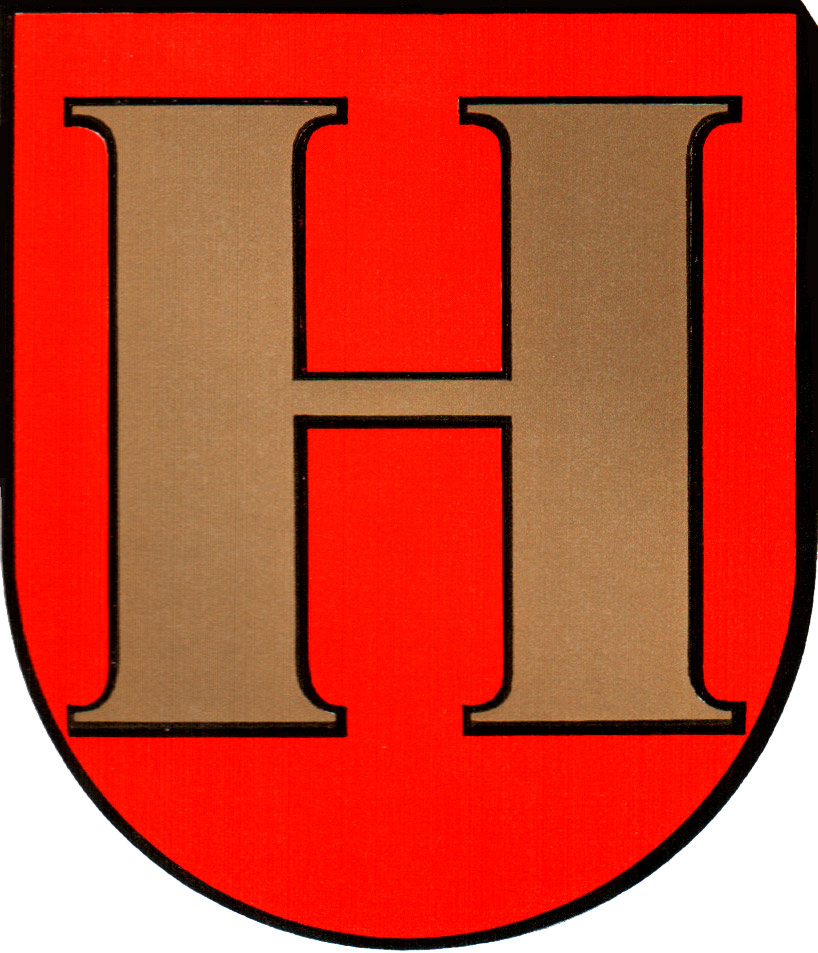
Heraldic sign of Hedemünden

Hedemünden is part of the city Hann. Münden in southern Lower Saxony. Until 1930, it was an independent municipality. About 1500 people live in the village.

== Location ==
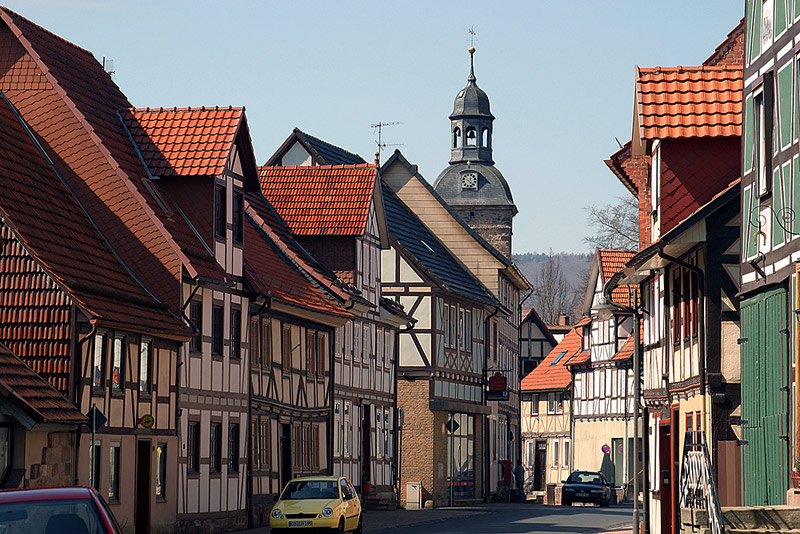
Historical center of Hedemünden

Hedemünden lies on the lower part of the river Werra. This river starts in Thuringia, runs through Hesse, and enters Lower Saxony in Hedemünden. The average elevation of Hedemünden is 130 m above sea level (NN), and the highest hill is 'Hohe Schleife' at 442 m above sea level.

== Traffic ==
Hedemünden lies on the highway A7(E45) from Frankfurt to Hamburg and on the Halle–Kassel railway. In addition the national road B80 ran through the center of the village until 1995; it now bypasses Hedemünden. The bypass was planned since the early 1960s but only built in the early 1990s when traffic in town became unbearable due to the reunification of Germany. The B80 connects Nordhausen in eastern Germany with Hann. Münden and the Weser area.

== History ==
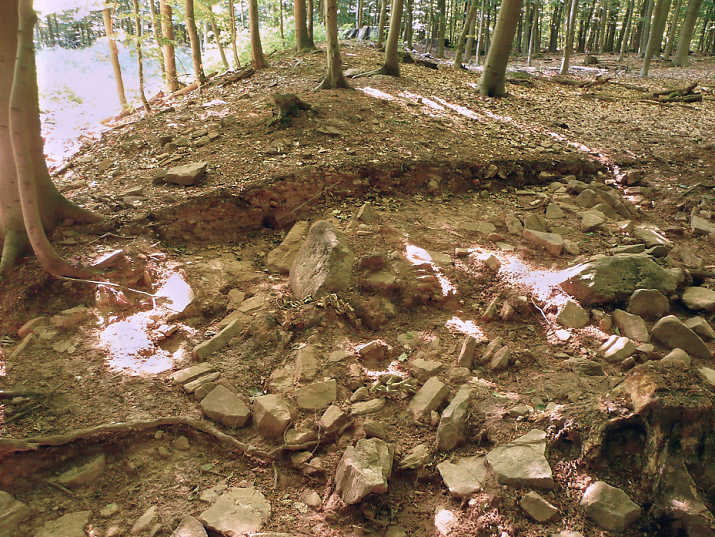
Archeological findings with cut through the wall surrounding the Roman camp

In about 1 CE, a Roman camp existed near Hedemünden. It is currently the northernmost known Roman camp in Germany. In the year 1017 Hedemünden was mentioned for the first time in a document: Emperor Henry II. donated the farm "Hademinni" to the abbey in Kaufungen, which was founded by his wife Kunigunde.

By the early medieval era (9th century CE) a church existed in Hedemünden. In the year 1210 it was remodeled with a newly designed church surrounded by a large wall so it could be used as a fortress as well. 300 years later, the church and the municipality built the first school on this wall.

In 1589, the village got the right to brew its own beer, and in 1645, it is first mentioned as a municipality of its own by Herzog Christian Ludwig. A new school building was erected in 1731, and in 1860 the municipality got its first constitution. In 1913 the school moved to a new building 300 m away from the first and in 1930 the municipality of Hedemünden ceded its independence, becoming part of Hann. Münden.

The Autobahn A7 was built in 1937 as part of the German war efforts. By this time most Jews had left the village or were deported.

After the war, rebuilding began. Factories of different kinds began to settle in the village for access to the infrastructure (river, Autobahn, and railway).

== Industrial settlement ==
The village Hedemünden developed a comparatively large industrial area due to its closeness to the Autobahn and the cities of Göttingen and Kassel. A large distribution center of the German discounter Aldi was built in the 1970s, a cable factory followed in the 1980s and an online retailer in the 1990s.

Currently a new industrial area Hedemünden 2 with 27 hectares is being developed. This is the largest free industrial area in the municipality of Hann. Münden.

== Literature ==
- Heinrich Hampe: Hedemünden - Aus der Geschichte einer kleinen Ackerbürgerstadt bis zu ihrem Verzicht auf die Stadtrechte 1930. Hampe, Hedemünden 1992.
- Klaus Grote: Stützpunkt der römischen Expansionspolitik. Das Römerlager bei Hedemünden an der Werra. Ein Vorbericht. In: Göttinger Jahrbuch. Göttingen 52.2004, S. 5–12. ISSN 0072-4882
- Klaus Grote: Römerlager Hedemünden. Herausgegeben vom Mündener Heimat- und Geschichtsverein Sydekum. Hann-Münden 2005. ISBN 3-925451-35-8
