= 271 =

271 in various calendars
- Gregorian calendar: 271; CCLXXI
- Ab urbe condita: 1024
- Assyrian calendar: 5021
- Balinese saka calendar: 192–193
- Bengali calendar: −323 – −322
- Berber calendar: 1221
- Buddhist calendar: 815
- Burmese calendar: −367
- Byzantine calendar: 5779–5780
- Chinese calendar: 庚寅年 (Metal Tiger); 2968 or 2761 — to — 辛卯年 (Metal Rabbit); 2969 or 2762
- Coptic calendar: −13 – −12
- Discordian calendar: 1437
- Ethiopian calendar: 263–264
- Hebrew calendar: 4031–4032
- Hindu calendars
- Vikram Samvat: 327–328
- Shaka Samvat: 192–193
- Kali Yuga: 3371–3372
- Holocene calendar: 10271
- Iranian calendar: 351 BP – 350 BP
- Islamic calendar: 362 BH – 361 BH
- Javanese calendar: 150–151
- Julian calendar: 271; CCLXXI
- Korean calendar: 2604
- Minguo calendar: 1641 before ROC 民前1641年
- Nanakshahi calendar: −1197
- Seleucid era: 582/583 AG
- Thai solar calendar: 813–814
- Tibetan calendar: ལྕགས་ཕོ་སྟག་ལོ་ (male Iron-Tiger); 397 or 16 or −756 — to — ལྕགས་མོ་ཡོས་ལོ་ (female Iron-Hare); 398 or 17 or −755

Roman Empire (271)

Year 271 (CCLXXI) was a common year starting on Sunday of the Julian calendar. At the time, it was known as the Year of the Consulship of Aurelianus and Bassus (or, less frequently, year 1024 Ab urbe condita). The denomination 271 for this year has been used since the early medieval period, when the Anno Domini calendar era became the prevalent method in Europe for naming years.

== Events ==
=== By place ===
==== Roman Empire ====
- After an indecisive battle, Emperor Aurelian defeats the Vandals, and forces them from Pannonia, and across the Danube.
- Battle of Placentia: The Iuthungi invade Italy and sack the city of Piacenza. A Roman army under Emperor Aurelian is ambushed and defeated.
  - Battle of Fano: The Iuthungi move towards a defenseless Rome. Aurelian rallies his men and defeats the Germanic tribes on the Metauro River, just inland of Fano.
  - Battle of Pavia: The Roman army pursues the Alamanni in Lombardy. Aurelian closes the passes in the Alps and encircles the invaders near Pavia. The Alamanni are destroyed and Aurelian receives the title Germanicus Maximus.
- Following Aurelian's execution of Felicissimus, the financial minister of the state treasury, on the charge of corruption, the mint workers of the city of Rome, with senatorial support, lead an uprising against Aurelian. In bitter street-fighting on the Caelian Hill the rebels are defeated. The revolt is followed by a purge of Aurelian's senatorial opponents, including Urbanus.
- Around this time, generals loyal to Aurelian defeat the usurpers Septimius in Dalmatia and Domitian II in southern Gaul. The Iuthungian invasion may have encouraged the spate of revolts.
- Aurelian begins construction of a new defensive wall to protect Rome. The Aurelian Walls, 19 kilometers (12 mi), enclose the city with fortifications.
- Perhaps around this time, Aurelian increases Rome's daily bread ration to nearly 1.5 pounds and adds pig fat to the list of foods distributed free to the populace.
- Aurelian defeats a Gothic raid into the Balkans and then invades the Gothic homeland. Here he defeats the Goths again, killing one of their leaders, Cannabas, who may be Cniva, the Goth who had won the battle of Abritus, at which Emperor Decius was killed.
- Aurelian withdraws Rome's administrative and military presence from Dacia (modern Romania), thereby rationalizing the Danube frontier and freeing resources for the forthcoming campaign against Zenobia.

==== Europe ====
- Victorinus, Emperor of the Gallic Empire, is assassinated by one of his officers, Attitianus, reportedly for reasons of personal revenge. He is succeeded by Tetricus I, who is elevated with the help of Victorinus' mother Victoria.

==== Near East ====
- Zenobia invades Asia Minor and seizes control of Cilicia and Galatia before being stalled in Bithynia.
- Shapur I of the Sasanian Empire dies, and his successor, his son Hormizd I, leads an army against nomads in Sogdiana, perhaps taking command of a war that had begun under his father. (Note: Some scholars date Shapur's death to 270 or 272)

=== By topic ===
==== Art and Science ====
- King Shapur I builds the Academy of Gundishapur (Iran), which becomes the intellectual center of the Sassanid Empire.
- A magnetic compass is first used in China.

== Births ==
- Sima Wei, Chinese prince of the Jin Dynasty (d. 291)

== Deaths ==
- Ding Feng, Chinese general and politician
- Domitian II, emperor of the Gallic Empire
- Felicissimus, Roman financial minister (rationalis)
- Hormizd I (or Ohrmazd), ruler of the Sassanid Empire
- Liu Shan, Chinese emperor of the Shu Han state (b. 207)
- Pei Xiu, Chinese official, writer, geographer and cartographer (b. 224)
- Sima Wang, Chinese general and prince of the Jin dynasty (b. 205)
- Victorinus, emperor of the Gallic Empire
