= 356 =

356 in various calendars
- Gregorian calendar: 356; CCCLVI
- Ab urbe condita: 1109
- Assyrian calendar: 5106
- Balinese saka calendar: 277–278
- Bengali calendar: −238 – −237
- Berber calendar: 1306
- Buddhist calendar: 900
- Burmese calendar: −282
- Byzantine calendar: 5864–5865
- Chinese calendar: 乙卯年 (Wood Rabbit); 3053 or 2846 — to — 丙辰年 (Fire Dragon); 3054 or 2847
- Coptic calendar: 72–73
- Discordian calendar: 1522
- Ethiopian calendar: 348–349
- Hebrew calendar: 4116–4117
- Hindu calendars
- Vikram Samvat: 412–413
- Shaka Samvat: 277–278
- Kali Yuga: 3456–3457
- Holocene calendar: 10356
- Iranian calendar: 266 BP – 265 BP
- Islamic calendar: 274 BH – 273 BH
- Javanese calendar: 238–239
- Julian calendar: 356; CCCLVI
- Korean calendar: 2689
- Minguo calendar: 1556 before ROC 民前1556年
- Nanakshahi calendar: −1112
- Seleucid era: 667/668 AG
- Thai solar calendar: 898–899
- Tibetan calendar: ཤིང་མོ་ཡོས་ལོ་ (female Wood-Hare); 482 or 101 or −671 — to — མེ་ཕོ་འབྲུག་ལོ་ (male Fire-Dragon); 483 or 102 or −670

Year 356 (CCCLVI) was a leap year starting on Monday of the Julian calendar. At the time, it was known as the Year of the Consulship of Constantius and Iulianus (or, less frequently, year 1109 Ab urbe condita). The denomination 356 for this year has been used since the early medieval period, when the Anno Domini calendar era became the prevalent method in Europe for naming years.

== Events ==
=== By place ===
==== Roman Empire ====
- February 19 – Emperor Constantius II issues a decree closing all pagan temples in the Roman Empire, and ordering the banishment once again of the anti-Arian patriarch of Alexandria, Athanasius. He tries to have him arrested during a vigil service, but Athanasius flees to the Nitrian desert in Upper Egypt.
- The veneration of non-Christian images is banned in the Roman Empire.
- Siege of Autun: Julian receives a report that Augustodunum (Autun) is under attack by the Alemanni. The city walls are in poor state and in danger of falling.
- Battle of Reims: Julian is defeated by the Alemanni at Reims (Gaul).
- Battle of Brumath: Roman forces pursue Germanic warbands through the Gallic countryside. Julian wins an open battle near Brumath (Alsace).
- Rhaetia (Switzerland) is invaded by the Alemanni.
- Winter – Siege of Senonae: Julian over-winters at Senonae (Bourgogne). German federated troops (foederati) desert and hostile warbands besiege the town.

==== Asia ====
- Naemul becomes king of the Silla dynasty (Three Kingdoms of Korea).

=== By topic ===
==== Religion ====
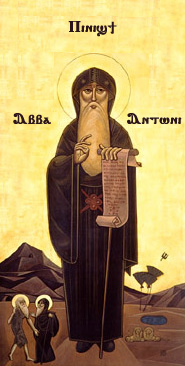
Anthony the Great

- Anthony the Great (pictured) dies at his hermitage near the Red Sea in mid-January at age 105 (approximate), having preached against Arianism, and having tried to codify guidelines for monastic life. His followers subsequently establish the Monastery of Saint Anthony, beginning the tradition of Coptic monasticism.
- Construction begins on the first basilica of Saint Peter in Rome.

== Births ==
- 31 March – Aelia Flaccilla, Roman empress and wife of Theodosius I (d. 386)
- John II, Byzantine bishop, theologian and writer (d. 417)

== Deaths ==
- Amasius of Teano, bishop Teano (also known as St. Paris)
- Anthony the Great, Egyptian monk and Desert Father
- Cai Mo (or Daoming), Chinese official and politician (b. 281)
- Qiang (or Mingde), Chinese empress and wife of Fú Jiàn
- Rav Nachman bar Yitzchak, Babylonian scholar and rabbi
- Sanctinus of Meaux, French bishop and missionary (b. 270)
- Vetranio, Roman statesman, usurper and co-emperor
- Yin Hao (or Yuanyuan), Chinese general and politician
