= Chronology of warfare between the Romans and Germanic peoples =

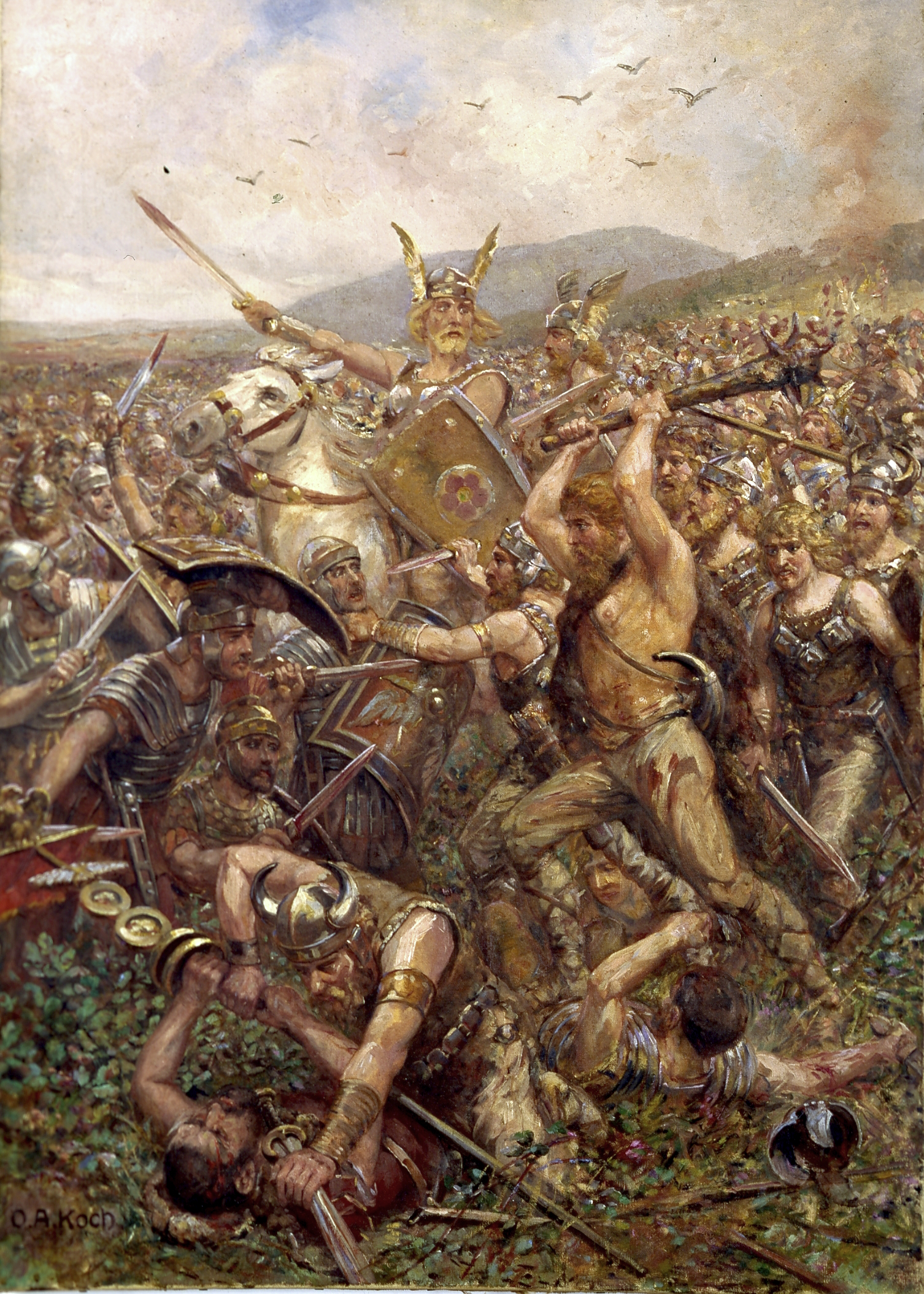
The Varus battle by Otto Albert Koch, 1909, a loose portrayal of the Battle of the Teutoburg Forest

This is a chronology of warfare between the Romans and various Germanic peoples. The nature of these wars varied through time between Roman conquest, Germanic uprisings, later Germanic invasions of the Western Roman Empire that started in the late second century BC, and more. The series of conflicts was one factor which led to the ultimate downfall of the Western Roman Empire in particular and ancient Rome in general in 476.

== List of campaigns ==
- Cimbrian War (113–101 BCE)
  - Battle of Noreia (112 BCE)
  - Battle of Burdigala (107 BCE)
  - Battle of Arausio (105 BCE)
  - Battle of Aquae Sextiae (102 BCE)
  - Battle of Vercellae (101 BCE)
- Battle of Vosges (58 BCE)
- Battle of the Sabis (57 BCE)
- Clades Lolliana (16 BCE)
- Roman campaigns in Germania (12 BCE–16 CE)
  - Drusus' Germanic campaign (11–9 BCE)
    - Battle of Arbalo (11 BCE)
    - Battle of the Lupia River (11 BCE)
  - Battle of the Teutoburg Forest (9 CE)
  - Germanicus's Germanic campaign
    - Campaign against the Marsi (14)
    - Campaign against the Chatti (15)
    - Campaign against the Bructeri (15)
    - Battle at Pontes Longi (15)
    - Battle of Idistaviso (16)
    - Battle of the Angrivarian Wall (16)
    - Campaign against the Chatti (16)
- Battle of Baduhenna Wood (28)
- Revolt of the Batavi (69–70)
- Domitian's Campaign against the Chatti (82)
- Clashes along the Danube (92)
- Marcomannic Wars (166–180)
  - Battle of Carnuntum (170)
- Crisis of the Third Century (235–284)
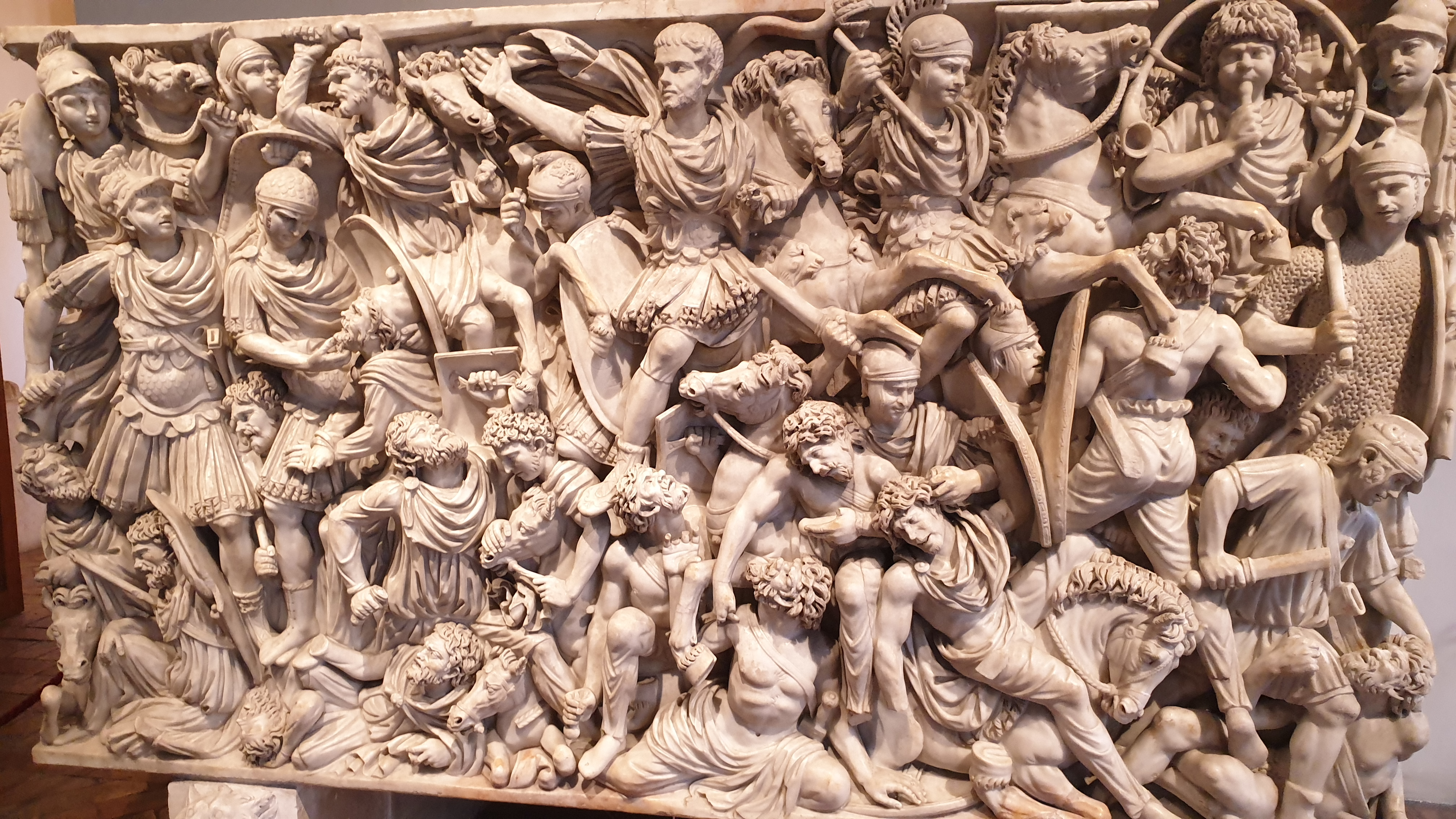
  The 3rd-century Ludovisi Battle sarcophagus depicts a battle between Goths and Romans.
  - Battle at the Harzhorn (c. 235)
  - Battle of Nicopolis ad Istrum (250)
  - Battle of Beroe (250)
  - Siege of Philippopolis (250)
  - Battle of Abritus (251)
  - Siege of Thessalonica (254)
  - Battle of Thermopylae (254)
  - Battle of Mediolanum (259)
  - Battle of Augusta Vindelicorum (260)
  - Siege of Mainz (268)
  - Battle of Lake Benacus (268)
  - Battle of Naissus (269)
  - Battle of Placentia (271)
  - Battle of Fano (271)
  - Battle of Pavia (271)
- Battle of Lingones (298)
- Battle of Vindonissa (298)
- German and Sarmatian campaigns of Constantine (306–336)
- Siege of Senonae (356)
- Siege of Autun (356)
- Battle of Reims (356)
- Battle of Brumath (356)
- Battle of Strasbourg (357)
- Great Conspiracy (367–368)
- Battle of Solicinium (368)
- Battle of Noviodunum (369)
- Gothic War (376–382)
  - Battle of Marcianople (376)
  - Battle of the Willows (377)
  - Battle of Dibaltum (377)
  - Battle of Adrianople (378)
  - Siege of Adrianople (378)
  - Battle of Constantinople (378)
  - Battle of Thessalonica (380)
- Battle of Argentovaria (378)
- Frankish invasion of 388
- Gothic Revolt of Tribigild (399–400)
- Gothic War (401–403)
  - Siege of Asti (402)
  - Battle of Pollentia (402)
  - Battle of Verona (403)
- War of Radagaisus (405–406)
  - Battle of Faesulae (406)
- Crossing of the Rhine (406)
- Sack of Rome (410)
- Gothic War in Spain (416–418)
- Castinus' campaign against the Franks (420–421)
- Vandalic War (422)
- Gothic revolt of Theodoric I (426)
- Frankish War (428)
- Vandal conquest of Roman Africa (429–432)
  - Battle of Calama (429)
  - Siege of Hippo Regius (430–431)
- Aetius campaign in the Alps (430–431)
- Frankish War (431–432)
- Burgundian Revolt of Gunther (436)
- Gothic War (436–439)
  - Battle of Narbonne (436)
  - Battle of Mons Colubrarius (439)
  - Battle of Toulouse (439)
- Vandalic War (439–442)
- Frankish War (441-446)
  - Battle of Vicus Helena (445)
- Sack of Rome (455)
- Gothic War in Spain (456)
  - Battle of Órbigo (456)
- Gothic War (457–458)
  - Battle of Arelate (458)
- Battle of Cartagena (461)
- Gothic war against Aegidius
  - Battle of Orleans (463)
- Vandalic War (461–468)
  - Battle of Cap Bon (468)
- Gothic revolt of Euric (468-471)
- Battle of Bolia (469)
- Battle of Arles (471)
- Spanish War of Euric (473-475)
- Battle of Ravenna (476)
- Franco-Roman War (486)
- Burgundian Civil War (500–501)
- Franco–Gothic War (507–511)
- Vandalic War (533–534)
  - Battle of Ad Decimum (533)
  - Battle of Tricamarum (533)
- Gothic War (535–554)
  - Siege of Panormus (535)
  - Siege of Naples (536)
  - Siege of Rome (537–538)
  - Siege of Ariminum (538)
  - Siege of Auximus (539)
  - Siege of Ravenna (539–540)
  - Battle of Treviso (541)
  - Siege of Verona (541)
  - Battle of Faventia (542)
  - Battle of Mucellium (542)
  - Siege of Naples (543)
  - Sack of Rome (546)
  - Siege of Rome (549–550)
  - Battle of Sena Gallica (551)
  - Battle of Taginae (552)
  - Battle of Mons Lactarius (553)
  - Battle of the Volturnus (554)
- Byzantine–Lombard wars (568–750)

== Chronology ==
=== Second century BC ===
The migrations of the Cimbri and the Teuton tribes (c. 120–101 BC). Roman victories. Cimbri and Teuton victories.

- 113–101 BC, Germanic Collision with the Roman Republic, Cimbrian War, Beginning of Germanic Wars.
  - 112 BC, Battle of Noreia, Suicide of Consul Gnaeus Papirius Carbo.
  - 107 BC, Helvetii defeat the Romans in the Battle of Agen, Consul Lucius Cassius Longinus dies in battle, General Lucius Calpurnius Piso Caesoninus dies in battle. (Battle against Allies of the Cimbri)
  - 105 BC, Battle of Arausio, Execution of Roman General Marcus Aurelius Scaurus, Proconsul Quintus Servilius Caepio and Consul Gnaeus Mallius Maximus exiled.
  - 102 BC, Consul Gaius Marius defeats the Sciri and Teutons in the Battle of Aquae Sextiae, Capture of King Teutobod, Extermination of the Teutons, Cimbri defeat Consul Quintus Lutatius Catulus in the Adige Valley.
  - 101 BC, Roman consuls Gaius Marius and Manius Aquillius defeat the Cimbri in the Battle of Vercellae, King Boiorix dies in battle, Extermination of the Cimbri.

=== First century BC ===
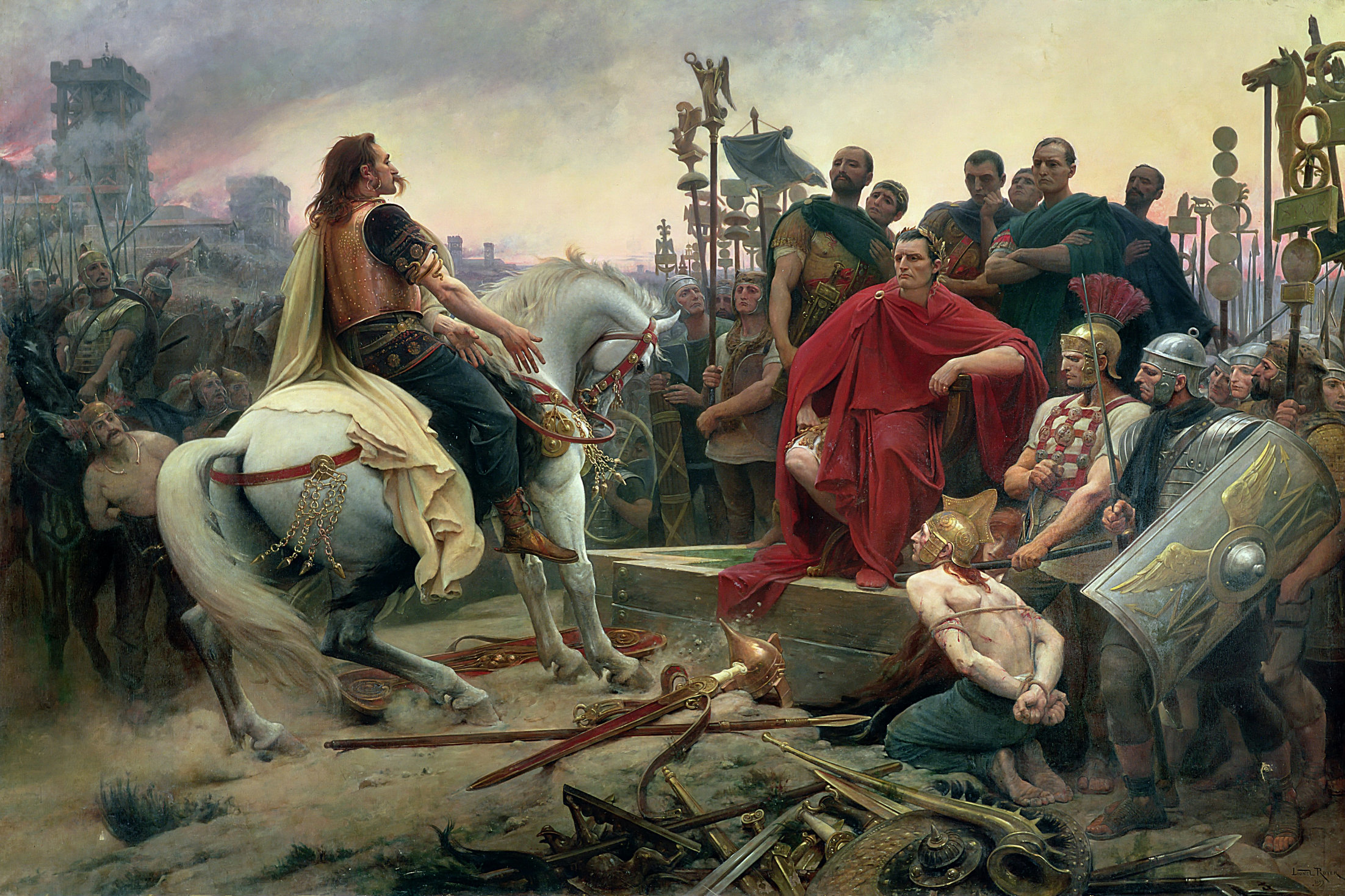
Vercingetorix Throws Down His Arms at the Feet of Julius Caesar by Lionel Noel Royer, 1899

- 58–51 BC, Conquest of Celtic Gaul to the Rhine by Julius Caesar, Gallic Wars.
  - 58 BC, Caesar decisively defeats the Helvetii in the Battle of the Arar and the Battle of Bibracte, Caesar decisively defeats the Suevi, led by Ariovistus, in the Battle of Vosges.
  - 57 BC, Battle of the Sabis.
  - 55 BC, Caesar's intervention against Tencteri and Usipetes, Caesar defeats a Germanic army then massacres the women and children, totalling 430,000 people, somewhere near the Meuse and Rhine rivers, Caesar's first crossing of the Rhine against the Suevi, Caesar's invasions of Britain. Archaeologists with Vrije Universiteit Amsterdam claim they've found the first physical evidence that the battle took place in what is now the Netherlands, near the city of Kessel, North Brabant.
  - 54 BCE, Destruction of the legion Legio XIV Gemina by the Eburones led by Cativolcus and Ambiorix, Lucius Aurunculeius Cotta dies in battle, Quintus Titurius Sabinus dies in battle.
  - 53 BC, Caesar's retaliation against the Eburones second crossing of the Rhine, Extermination of the Eburones.
  - 52 BC, Fall of Celtic Gaul, Gaul becomes a Roman province.
- 46 BC, Execution of Vercingetorix the Celt.
- 30–29 BC, Rebellion of the Morini and Treveri with aid of the Suebi crushed by proconsuls Gaius Carrinas and Gaius Cornelius Gallus.
- 20 BC, Marcus Vipsanius Agrippa, Governor of Transalpine Gaul, Construction of military roads and especially the military road Lugdunum--Divodurum--Treverorum--Agrippinensium (from Lyon to Cologne).
- 16 BC, clades Lolliana, Destruction of the legion Legio V Alaudae by Sicambri and their allies, Fall of the Kingdom of Noricum.
- 16–13 BC, Emperor Augustus on the Rhine, Reorganization of the Three Gauls (capital Trier), Decision to fortify the left bank of the Rhine and conquest of Germania to the Elbe, Rome pays tribute to the Frisii, Begin of invasions east of the Rhine by Rome, Construction of the modern city of Mainz begins.
- 12–9 BC, Invasions of Drusus up the Elbe from the North Sea, the Lippe and Main, Battle of the Lupia River, Cherusci, Marsi and Sicambri subdued, Chatti, Mattiaci, Tencteri and Usipetes are overrun, Frisii and other the Germans along the lower Rhine defeated, Canal of Drusus constructed, Establishment of new forts by Rome of Haltern am See, Xanten, Haltern, Oberaden, Holsterhausen, Anreppen and Beckinghausen.
- 9 BC, Creation of Magna Germania (capital Cologne), Pacification campaigns against the Germanic tribes by the Roman Empire, Marcomanni defeated and forced to flee into the territory of the Boii.
- 8–7 BC, Construction of military forts on both sides of the Weser, Deportation of 40,000 Sicambri and Suebi west of the Rhine.
- 6–2 BC, Lucius Domitius Ahenobarbus leads a Roman army across the Elbe. Construction of military roads, called the pontes longi, amid the vast swamps between the Rhine and the Ems. Hermunduri subdued and forced to flee into the territory of the Marcomanni.

=== First century ===
- 1–4 AD, Rise of the Chatti and Bructeri (immensum bellum) suppressed by Tiberius, who reaches the Elbe. Canninefates, Chattuarii, Cherusci are again subdued. Lombards, Semnones, Chauci and other tribes who dwelt on both sides of the Elbe are subjugated.
- 5, The Roman navy reaches the Cimbrian peninsula for the first time. Cimbri, Charudes, Semnones and other Germanic tribes who inhabit the region declare themselves friends of the Roman people.
- 6–9, Uprising in Illyricum, which cancels the major Roman project of war against Suevic Marcomanni. Romans forced to move eight of eleven legions present in Magna Germania to crush the rebellion in the Balkans and Pannonia.
- 6, Varus succeeds Saturninus as governor of Germania with the mission of peacekeeping and the implementation of tax and judicial administration.
- 9, clades Variana, Destruction of the legions XVII, XVIII and XIX by Arminius in the Battle of Teutoburg Forest, Suicide of Administrator Varus, Loss of military camps east of the Rhine., Roman Empire is forced to strategically withdraw from Germania. Pro-Roman Germanic coalition led by Maroboduus and Segestes turns against Arminius. The resistance of the Roman garrison of Aliso and the arrival of Roman reinforcements on the Rhine prevent Arminius from invading Gaul.
- 10–13, Military command of Tiberius in Germania and interventions in the valley of the Lippe, replaced by Germanicus, Construction of Limes Germanicus begins.
- 14, Mutiny of the legions of Germania.
- 14–16, Roman retaliation against Cherusci, Chatti, Bructeri and Marsi, capture of Thusnelda, recovery of two legionary standards lost in the Battle of the Teutoburg Forest.

Battles of Idistaviso and the Angrivarian Wall.

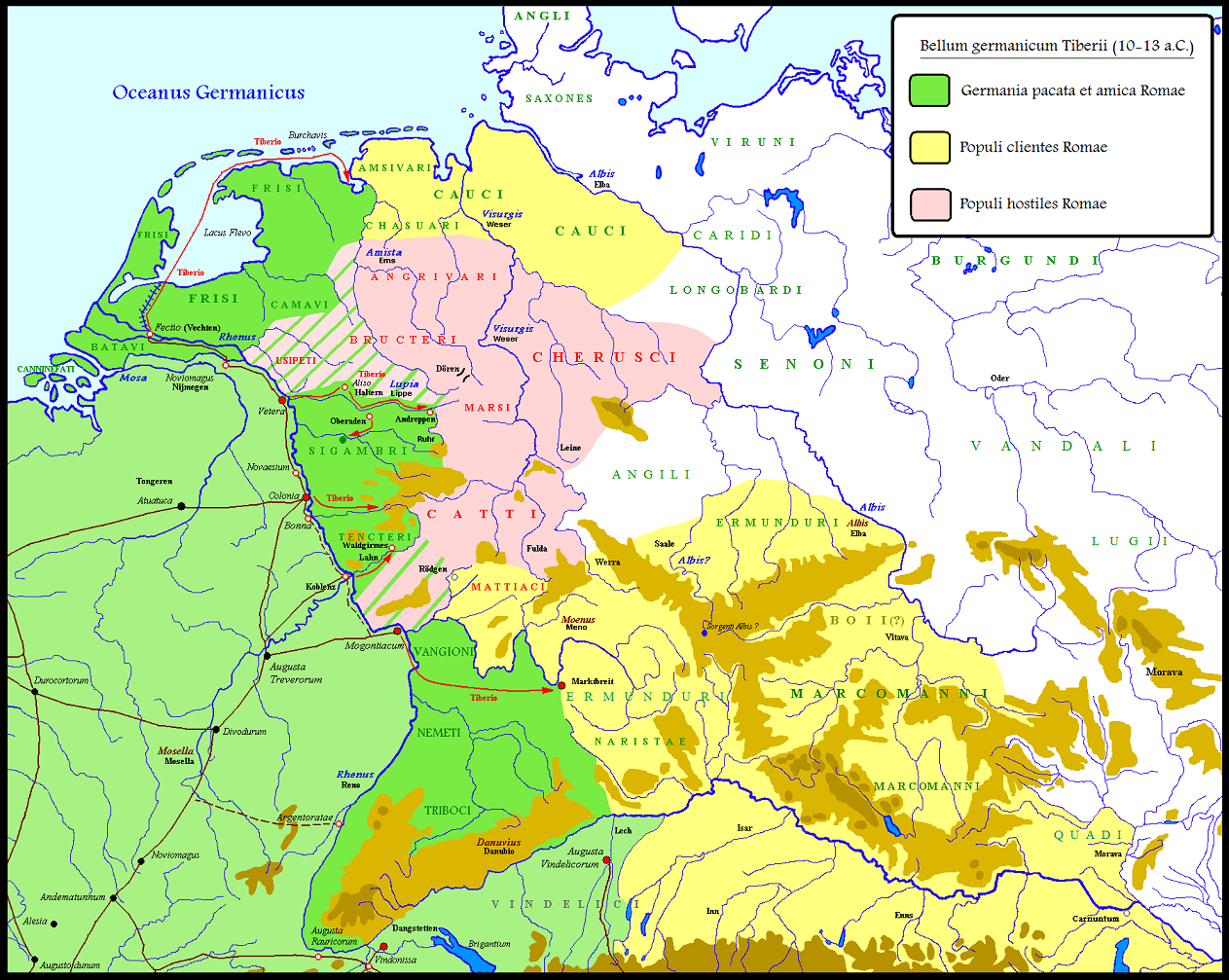
Campaigns of Tiberius and Germanicus in the years 10/11-13 CE. In pink the anti-Roman Germanic coalition led by Arminius. In dark green, territories still directly held by the Romans, in yellow the Roman client states

- 17, Cessation of military offensives east of the Rhine by Tiberius, Civil war between pro-Roman and anti-Roman Germanic tribes ends in a stalemate.
- 19, Death of Germanicus.
- 20, In a series of actions backed by Rome, Vannius came to power following the defeat of the Marcomannic king Catualda by the Hermunduri king of Vibilius, establishing the kingdom of Vannius (regnum Vannianum). Vannius was a client king of the Roman Empire and ruled from 20 AD to 50 AD.
- 21, Assassination of Arminius.
- 28, Revolt of the Frisii, Tax collectors hanged, Romans defeated in the Battle of Baduhenna Wood.
- 41, Raid against the Chauci under Emperor Claudius, Recovery of third legionary standard lost in the Battle of the Teutoburg Forest.
- 47, Cnaeus Domitius Corbulo crosses the Rhine, defeats the Frisii and Chauci and occupies their territory.
- 50, Raid against the Chatti under Emperor Claudius, Liberation of Roman prisoners.
- 54, Under Emperor Nero, Frisian raid repulsed.
- 69–70, Revolt of the Batavi, Destruction of 2 Roman legions by the Batavi, Rebellion crushed by Quintus Petillius Cerialis.
- 72, Under Emperor Vespasian, Romans occupy and settle the Agri Decumates.
- 82–83, Campaign against the Chatti under Emperor Domitian, Roman armies conquer the territory of Chatti with the help of Mattiaci, Hermunduri and Cherusci, Triboci and Nemetes subdued, Establishment of new Roman forts of Ladenburg, Neuenheim, Ladenburg, Sulz, Geislingen, Rottenburg an der Laaber, Burladingen, Gomadingen, Donnstetten, Urspring, Günzburg.
- 89, Lucius Antonius Saturninus, Legio XIV Gemina and Legio XXI Rapax revolt against Rome with aid of the Chatti.

=== Second century ===
- c. 165, Invasion of Pannonia by Lombards and Ubii.
- 166–180, Germanic tribes invade the frontiers of the Roman Empire, specifically the provinces of Raetia and Moesia, Marcomannic Wars.
- 180, Goths reach the banks of the Black Sea.

=== Third century ===
- 213–214, Emperor Caracalla's successful campaign against the Alamanni, fortifications of Raetia and Germania Superior strengthened.
- 235–284, Crisis of the Third Century.
  - 235, Battle at the Harzhorn.
  - 238, Gothic raid on Istria,
  - 248–249, Raid in Marcianopolis by Goths.
  - 250, Roman victory at the Battle of Nicopolis ad Istrum. Gothic victory at the Battle of Beroe. Siege and sack of Philippopolis by Goths led by Cniva.
  - 251, Three Roman legions defeated by Goths at the Battle of Abritus, Emperor Decius dies in battle, Co-Emperor Herennius Etruscus dies in battle.
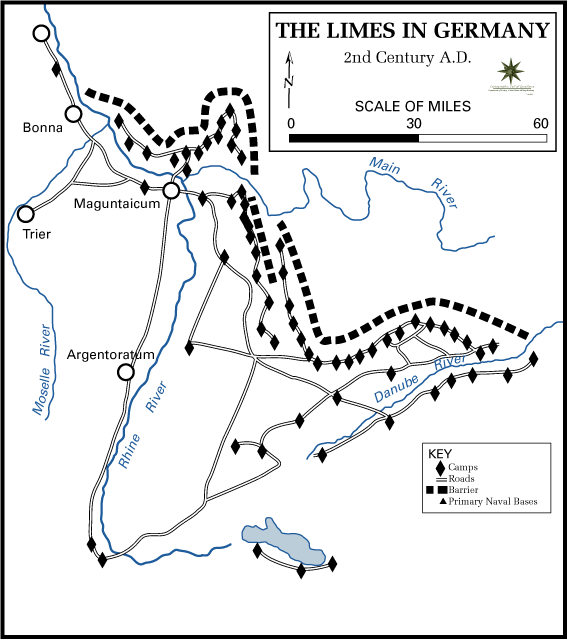
    The area (Agri Decumates) between Main and Rhine was evacuated in 259 AD, dozens of Roman camps were abandoned.
  - 254, successful Graeco-Roman defense of Thessalonica at the Siege of Thessalonica. Successful Graeco-Roman defense of Achaea at the Battle of Thermopylae.
  - 259, 300,000 Alemanni die in the Battle of Mediolanum (Milan).
  - 259–260, Evacuation of the agrarian area Agri Decumates by the Roman Empire, Roman Empire retreats behind the Rhine.
  - 260–274, Usurper Postumus, of possible Batavian origin, declares himself Emperor of the Gallic Empire including Roman Gaul, Roman Britain, Roman Spain and Germania. He assumed the title Germanicus Maximus after successfully campaigning against Franks and Alamanni.
  - c. 267–269, Invasion of the Goths, Gothic attacks on Marcianopolis and Chrysopolis, Sack of Byzantium.
  - 268, Siege of Mainz, Battle of Lake Benacus, assassination of Gallic Emperor Postumus.
  - 269, Battle of Naissus, end of Gothic Invasion.
  - 271, Battle of Placentia, Battle of Fano, Battle of Pavia, Destruction of Alemannic army, Emperor Aurelian repelled another Gothic invasion but abandoned the province of Dacia north of Danube forever, Construction of the Aurelian Wall begins.
  - 277–278, Emperor Probus's successful campaigns against Goths, Alamanni, Longiones, Franks and Burgundians. Reportedly, 400,000 barbarians were killed during this campaign, and the entire nation of the Lugii were extirpated.
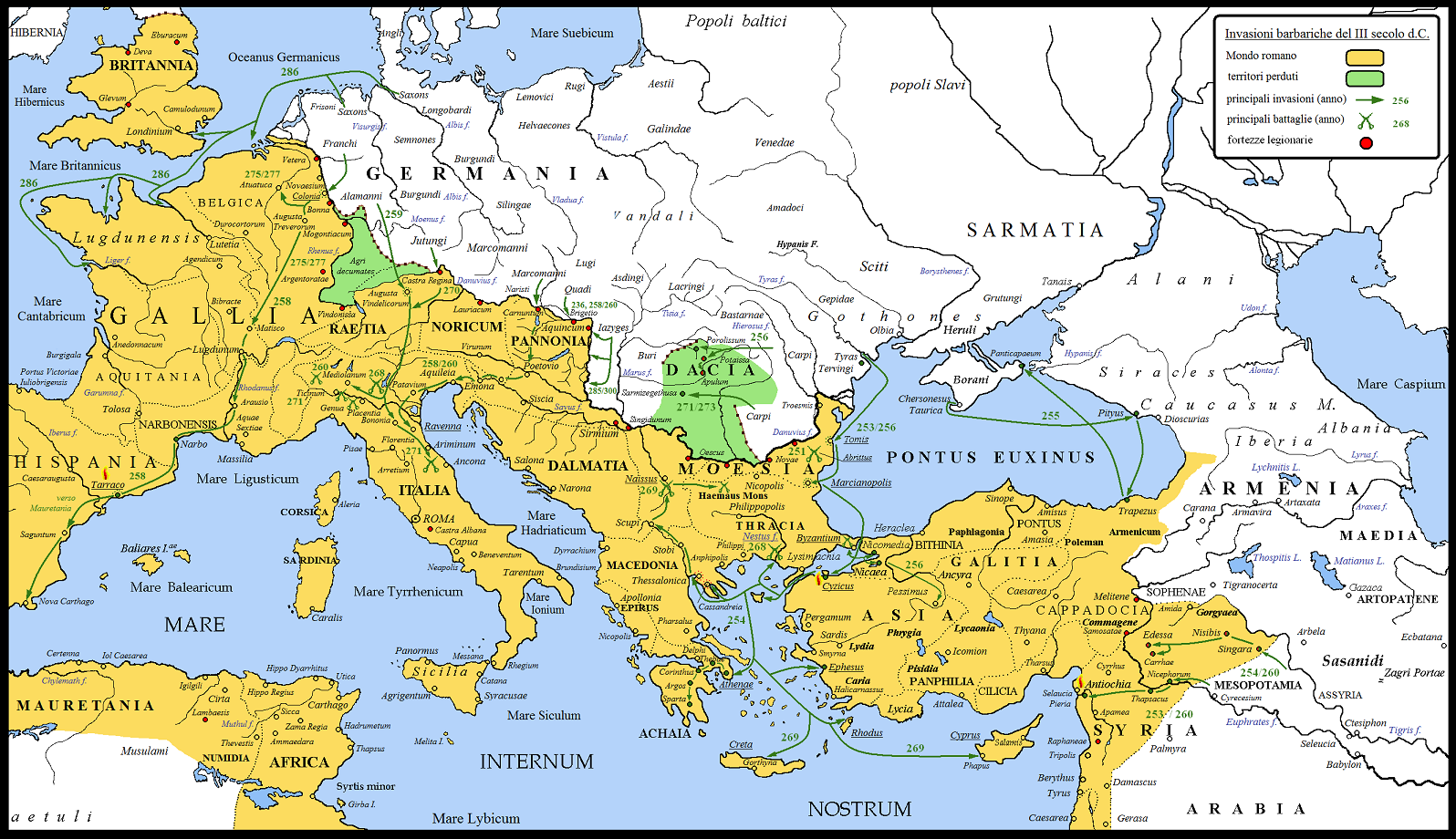
    Barbarian invasions of the Roman Empire during the Crisis of the Third Century
- 286, Campaign against the Alamanni, Burgundians, Heruli and Chaibones under Emperor Maximian.
- 287–288, Salian Franks, Chamavi and Frisii surrender and become subjects of the Roman Empire. Maximian move them to Germania Inferior to provide manpower and prevent the settlement of other Germanic tribes.
- 292, Constantius defeat the Franks who had settled at the mouth of the Rhineand and deport them to the nearby region of Toxandria providing a buffer along the northern Rhine and reducing his need to garrison the region.
- 296, Frisians deported into Roman territory as laeti.
- 298, Battle of Lingones.
- 298, Battle of Vindonissa.

=== Fourth century ===
- 306–310, Emperor Constantine the Great drives the Franks back beyond the Rhine and captures two of their kings, Ascaric and Merogaisus. The prisoners are fed to the beasts of Trier's amphitheater in the adventus (arrival) celebrations that followed. Constantine crosses the Rhine in 308 and 310, devastating the lands of the Franks and the Bructeri.
- 332, Roman invasion north of the Danube under Emperor Constantine the Great. Capture of Gothic Prince Ariaricus. Nearly one hundred thousand Goths die before submitting to Rome. (Note: wikisource:Ecclesiastical history (Sozomen), book I; chapter 8, and book II; chapter 34)
- 306–337, After thirty years of military campaigns Constantine regains control over a good part of the territories which had been abandoned by Gallienus and Aurelian. This included the Agri decumates from the Alemanni, the plain south of the Tisza (Banat) from the Sarmatians and Oltenia & Wallachia from the Goths.
- c. 350, Infiltration of Germania Inferior by Franks.
- 354–355, Roman double victory over Alamanni under Emperor Constantius II. (Note: wikisource:Roman History, book 14; chapter 10, and book 15; chapter 4)
- 356, Recapture of Colonia Agrippina (Cologne) by future Emperor Julian the Apostate, Siege of Senonae by Alamanni, Siege of Autun by Alemanni, Battle of Reims, Battle of Brumath.

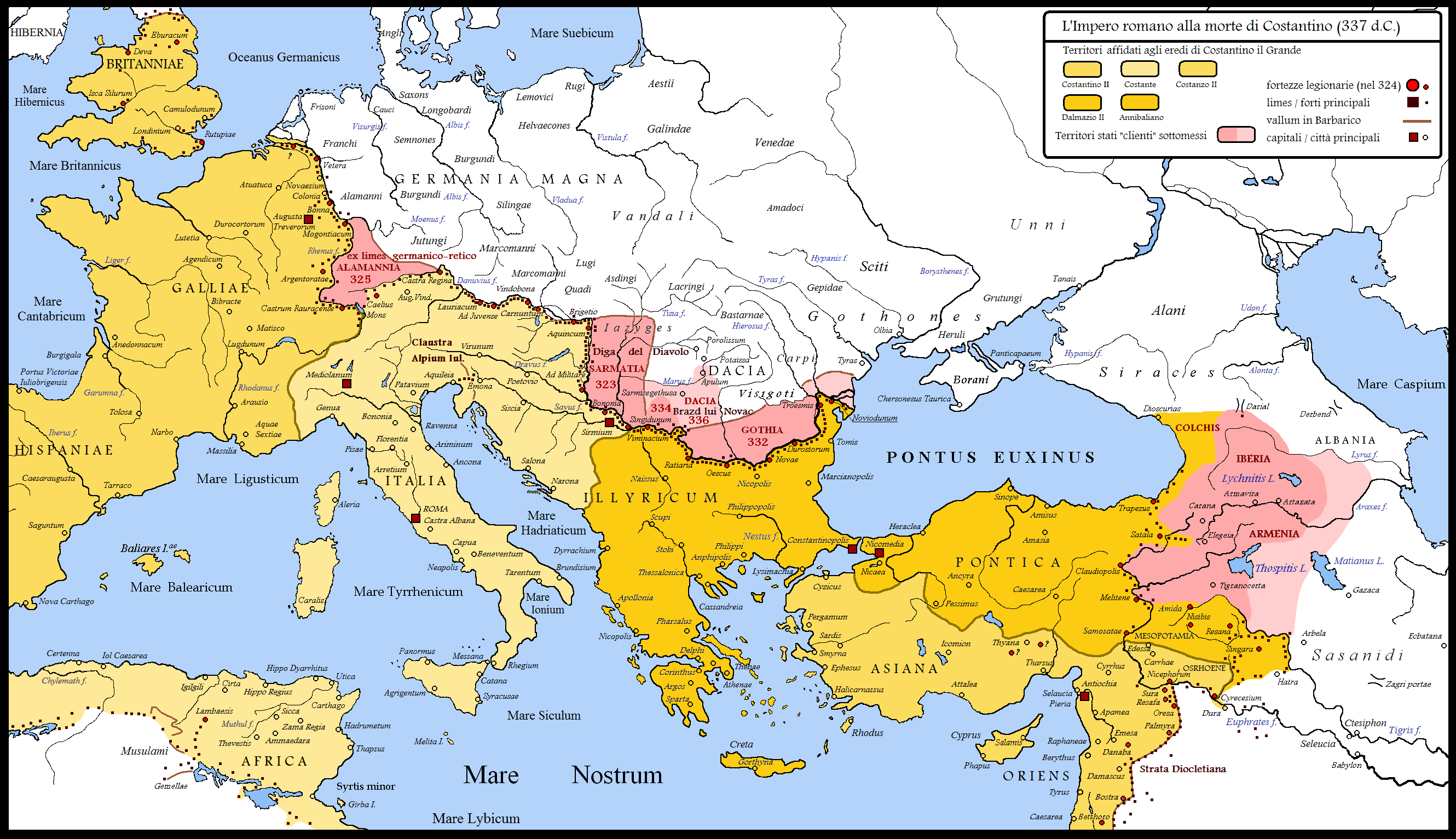
The northern and eastern frontiers of the Roman Empire in the time of Constantine, with the territories acquired in the course of the thirty years of military campaigns between 306 and 337

- 357, Roman invasion of Alemannic territory led by general Barbatio and Julian, Attack on Lugdunum (Lyon) by Laeti, End of coordinated operation against the Alemanni, Battle of Argentoratum, Capture of Alemannic King Chnodomarius, Julian crosses the Rhine at Moguntiacum and forces three Alamannic kingdoms to submit, Franks expelled from the basin of the Meuse.
- 358, Raid in the province of Raetia by Alemannic Juthungi, Destruction of Castra Regina (Regensburg) by Alemanni, Julian forces the Salian Franks into submission and expel the Chamavi back to Hamaland.
- 359, Execution of Roman General Barbatio, Recapture of Moguntiacum by Julian, Emperor Constantius II crosses the Danube at Brigetio (Komárom) and devastates the Quadian lands. (Note: wikisource:Roman History, book 17; chapters 12–13)
- 365, Invasion of Roman Gaul by Alemanni, Alemanni leave with spoil and captives
- 366, Alemanni invade Roman Gaul a second time
- 367, Sack of Moguntiacum by Alemanni, Battle of Solicinium, Roman army led by Eastern Emperor Valens defeats Gothic Greuthungi and captures their king Ermanaric.
- 367–368, Great Barbarian Conspiracy against Roman Britain and Roman Gaul by Saxons and Franks, Death of Nectaridus.
- 367–369, Attack on Gothic Thervingi under Eastern Emperor Valens. (Note: wikisource:Roman History, book 27; chapter 5)
- 368, Invasion of Alemannic territory under Emperor Valentinian the Great, Crossing of the Rhine by the Roman Empire.
- 369, Destruction of a fortress near Heidelberg by Alemanni.
- 370, Invasion of Roman Gaul by Saxons, Death of all invading Saxons, Invasion of Alemannic territory by Valentinian the Great, Rome captures thousands of Alemannic Bucinobantes, Deposition of Alemannic King Macrian, Hunnic raids on Gothic Greuthungi. (Note: wikisource:Roman History, book 31; chapter 3) (Note: wikisource:Ecclesiastical history (Sozomen), book 6; chapter 37)
- 374, Assassination of Quadic King Gabinius, Invasion of former Illyricum by Quadi and Sarmatians.
- 375, Pillaging of Quadi lands by the Roman Empire, Western Emperor Valentinian the Great dies during peace negotiations.

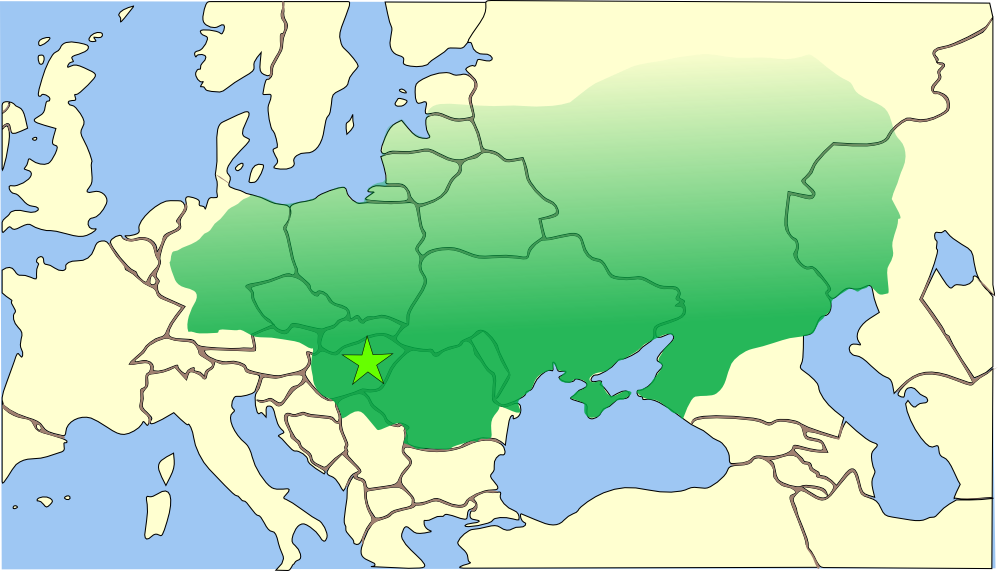
Empire of the Huns, pushing the Germanic tribes over the Limes into the Roman Empire

- 376, Invasion of the Huns, Hunnic war against Visigoths and Ostrogoths, Suicide of Gothic King Ermanaric, Gothic King Vithimer dies in battle.
- 376–382, Hunnic raids on Gothic Thervingi (Visigoths), (Note: wikisource:Roman History, book 31; chapter 3) (Note: wikisource:Ecclesiastical history (Sozomen), book 6; chapter 37) Gothic War, (Note: wikisource:Ecclesiastical history (Sozomen), book 6; chapter 37) (Note: wikisource:Roman History, book 31; chapters 5–16) Plundering and destruction throughout the Balkans by Goths.
  - 377, Battle of the Willows, Gothic chieftain Farnobius dies in battle.
  - 378, Battle of Adrianople, (Note: wikisource:Roman History, book 31; chapters 5–16) Eastern Emperor Valens dies in battle, Begin of the Fall of the Western Roman Empire.
- 377–378, Invasion of Thrace and Moesia by Gothic Greuthungi led by chieftain Alatheus.
- 378, Invasion of Alsace by Alemanni, Battle of Argentovaria, Extermination of Alemannic Lentienses, Alemannic King Priarius dies in battle.
- 380, Battle of Thessalonica, Death of Gothic chieftain Fritigern, Begin of naval raids by Saxons, Begin of the Migration of the Saxons.
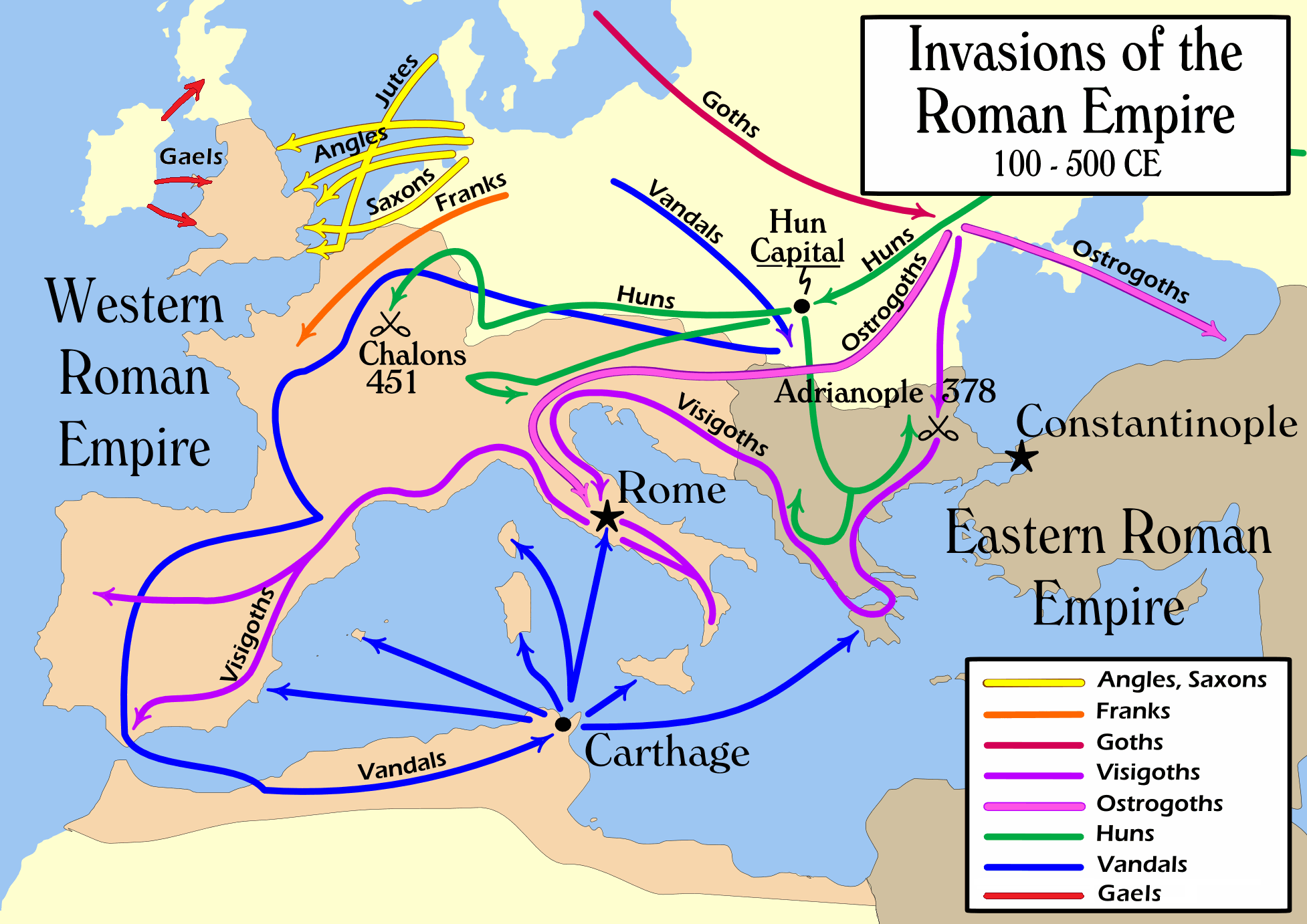
  Routes taken by barbarian invaders of the Roman Empire during the Migration Period
- 382, Peace between Rome and the Goths, Large Gothic contingents of Thervingi, Taifali and Victohali settle along the southern Danube frontier in the province of Thrace.
- 383, Failed raid in the province of Raetia by Alemannic Juthungi.
- 387, Failed Invasion of Thrace and Moesia by Gothic Greuthungi led by chieftain Alatheus, Greuthungi chieftain Alatheus dies in battle.
- 390, Massacre of Thessalonica.
- 392, Emperor Valentinian II is hanged, Frankish General Arbogast names Eugenius to be Western Emperor.
- 394, 20,000 Gothic mercenaries support Eastern Emperor Theodosius the Great in the Battle of the Frigidus, Suicide of Frankish General Arbogast, Execution of puppet Western Emperor Eugenius.
- 395, Assassination of Consul Rufinus by Gothic mercenaries.

=== Fifth century ===
For the timeline of events in Britannia after its abandonment by Emperor Valentinian III, see Timeline of conflict in Anglo-Saxon Britain.

- 401–402, Raid in Raetia by Vandals.
- 401–403, Invasion of Italy by Visigoths under Alaric I, Gothic War.
  - 402, Gothic Siege of Asti lifted by Stilicho.
  - 402, Alaric defeated by Stilicho at the Battle of Pollentia.
  - 403, Alaric's army destroyed at the Battle of Verona, Visigoths pushed into former Illyricum by Stilicho.
- 405–406, Siege of Florentia, Battle of Faesulae, execution of Gothic King Radagaisus (August 406), 12,000 Gothic higher-status fighters are drafted into the Roman army. War between Frankish federates and Vandals (Vandal king Godigisel dies in battle), "Battle of Moguntiacum" (Alans under King Respendial rescue the Vandals), Crossing of the Rhine by Vandals, Suebi, Burgundians (?) and Alans (405–406, exact date disputed).
- 406, Usurpation of Marcus in Britannia (late 406), supposedly in response to the Crossing of the Rhine.
- 408, Failed invasion of Moesia by Huns and Germanic mercenaries led by Uldin the Hun, Capture of thousands of Germanic mercenaries, Execution of Roman General Stilicho (August), Slaughter of wives and children of barbarian foederati, Siege of Rome by Visigoths, Attacks on Roman Britain by Saxons.

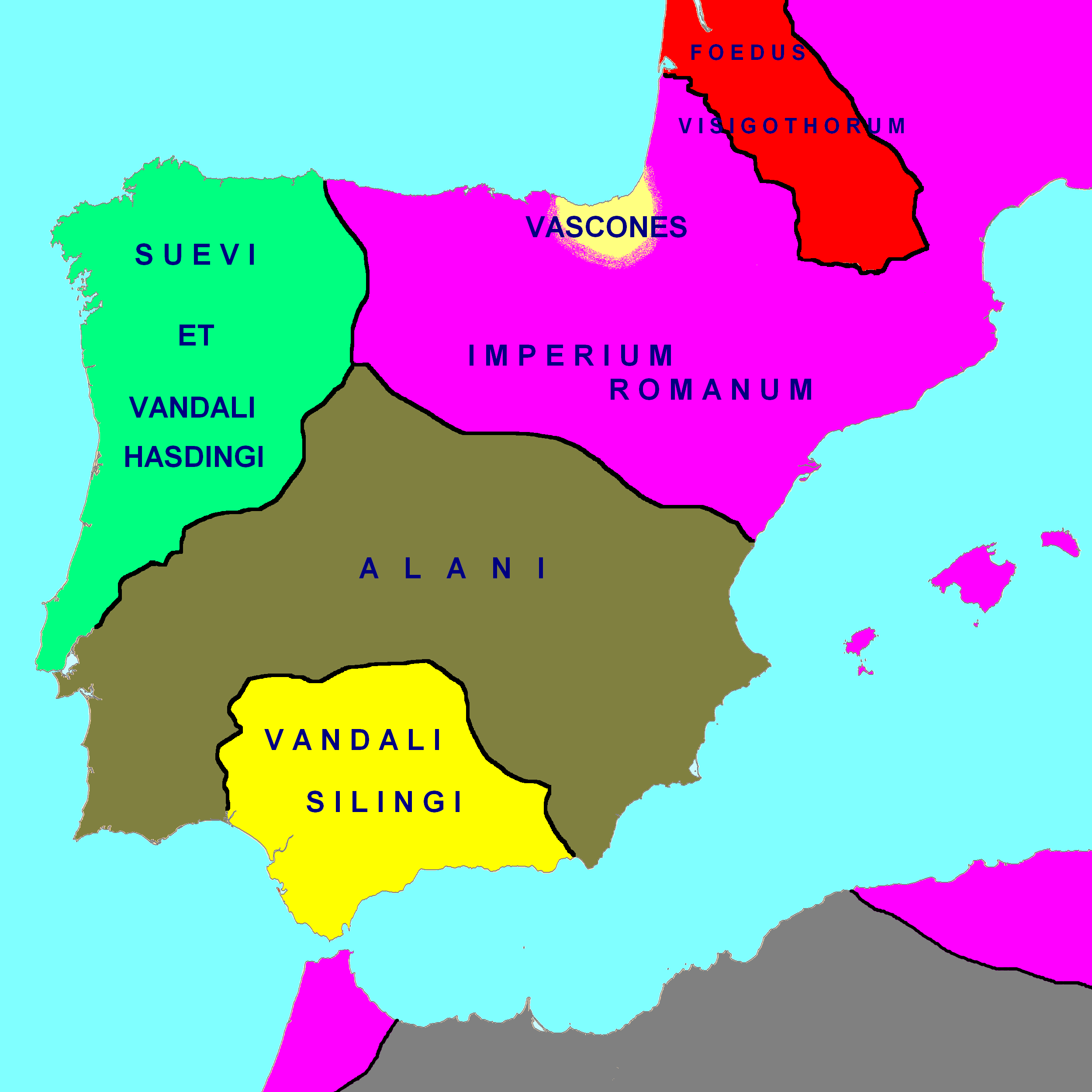
Kingdom of the Vandals (yellow) and their allies the Sarmatian Alans before the invasion of Roman Africa, c. 418

- 409, second Siege of Rome by Visigoths. Invasion of Roman Spain by Vandals, Suebi (Marcomanni, Quadi, Buri) and Alans (September or October 409).
- 410, Sack of Rome by Visigoths, beginning of attacks on Vandals by Visigoths, Begin of Barbarian raids by Picts, Scoti and Irish Celts, End of Roman rule in Britain, Suevi establish a kingdom in Galicia.
- 411, Jovinus declares himself Western Roman Emperor with aid of the Burgundians, Franks and Alans, Burgundians establish a Kingdom left of the Rhine under King Gundahar. First sack of Trier by the Franks
- 413, Capture of Narbonne and Toulouse by Visigoths led by King Ataulf. Usurper Jovinus is executed. Second sack of Trier by the Franks.
- 421, Third sack of Trier by the Franks.
- 418 Visigoths settle in southwestern Gaul.
- 426–436, Campaigns against the Visigoths in southern Gaul under Western Emperor Valentinian III, Battle of Narbonne, Capture of Visigothic chieftain Anaolsus.
- 428–431, Failed Roman campaigns against Salian Franks, Alemannic Juthungi on the Rhine and Danube, Germanus of Auxerre leads Romano-Britons to a victory against Saxon raiders.

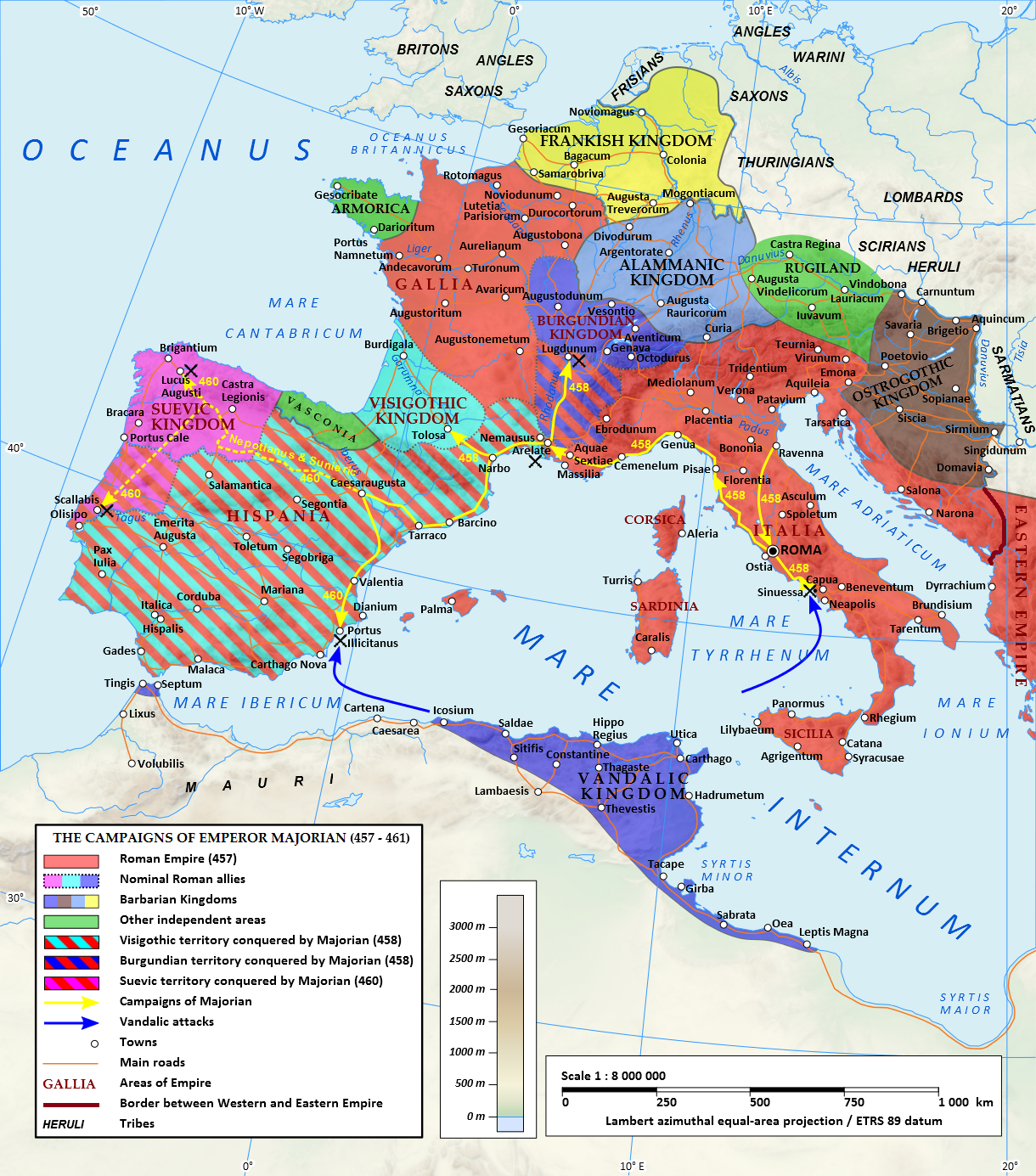
During his four-year reign Majorian reconquered most of Hispania and southern Gaul, meanwhile reducing the Visigoths, Burgundians and Suevi to federate status.

- 428 or 435, Fourth sack of Trier by the Franks.
- 429–439, Invasion of Africa by Vandals led by Vandal King Genseric, Siege of Hippo Regius, Capture of Carthage by Vandals, Capture of Roman navy by Vandals, Pillaging of Sicily, Begin of pirate raids by Vandals.
- 431, Invasion to the Somme River by Salian Franks.
- 436–437, Invasion of Burgundian Rhineland by Hun mercenaries controlled by Rome, Burgundian King Gundahar dies in battle.
- c. 443, Britain plunges into civil war, Groans of the Britons, Britain is abandoned by Western Emperor Valentinian III.
- c. 445–450, Invasion of Northern Gaul by Salian Franks led by king Chlodio, who conquers the cities of Tournai and Cambrai.
- 448, Defeat of the Salian Franks in the Battle of Vicus Helena by Roman General Aëtius.
- 451, Invasion of Gaul by the Huns with Frankish, Gothic and Burgundian mercenaries led by Attila the Hun, Sack of Trier, Attack on Metz, Siege of Orléans, Coalition of Romans, Franks and Visigoths led by General Aëtius stop the Huns in the Battle of Châlons, Visigothic King Theodoric I dies in battle.
- 452, Invasion of northern Italy under Attila the Hun: Sack of Aquileia, Vicetia, Verona, Brixia, Bergamum and Milan.
- 453, Hunnic and Germanic attacks on Constantinople, Attila the Hun dies during heavy drinking.
- 454, Assassination of Roman General Aëtius, Gepids establish a kingdom in Pannonia.
- 455, Sack of Rome by Vandals, Capture of Empress Licinia Eudoxia by Vandals.
- 456, Visigoths defeat the Suebic Kingdom of Galicia in the Battle of Órbigo.
- 458, Emperor Majorian leads the Roman army to a victory over the Vandals near Sinuessa, Roman victory over the Visigoths in southern Gaul in the Battle of Arelate.

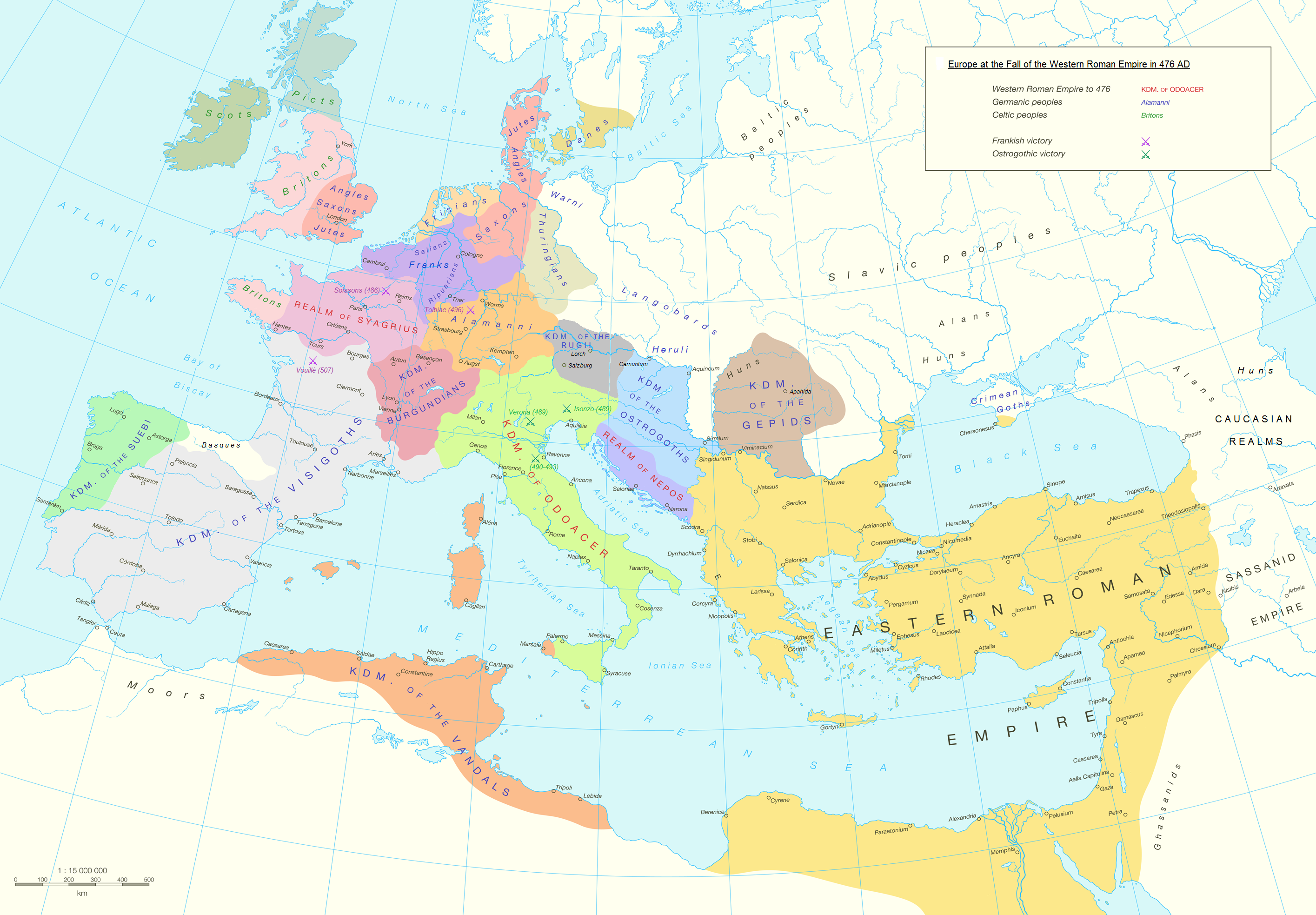
Europe in the late fifth century (476–486)

- 459, Seizure of Trier by Franks, Roman reconquest of southern Gaul and most of Hispania under Emperor Majorian.
- 460, Roman victory over the Suebi at Lucus Augusti, Roman fleet is destroyed by traitors paid by the Vandals, Attack on the kingdom of the Vandals cancelled.
- 461, Seventeen Vandal ships destroy forty Roman ships in a surprise attack.
- 463, Battle of Orleans.
- 465, Ostrogothic King Valamir dies in battle.
- 468, Invasion of the Vandal Kingdom by the Byzantine Empire, Defeat of the Byzantine Empire by the Vandals in the Battle of Cape Bon.
- 469, Ostrogoths decisively defeat an alliance of pro-Roman Germanic forces in the Battle of Bolia, Fall of the Hunnic Empire, Visigoths thwarted an attack by an alliance of Bretons and Romans in the Battle of Déols.
- 471, Battle of Arles, Roman army crushed by Visigoths, most of southern Gaul re-captured by Visigoths, Emperor Anthemius deposed by his own general.
- 472, Revolt in Thrace by Ostrogoths led by chieftain Theodoric Strabo.
- 476, Revolt of Heruli, Sciri and Turcilingi mercenaries, Battle of Ravenna, Germanic Heruli chieftain Odoacer becomes King of Italy, Deposition of Romulus Augustulus, the last de facto Western Roman Emperor, Fall of the Western Roman Empire.
- 480, Assassination of Julius Nepos, the last de jure Western Roman Emperor.
- 486, Franks under Merovingian King Clovis I defeat the Kingdom of Soissons in the Battle of Soissons, Fall of the Kingdom of Soissons.
- 489, Theodoric the Great defeats Odoacer in the Battle of Isonzo, Battle of Verona.

=== Sixth century ===
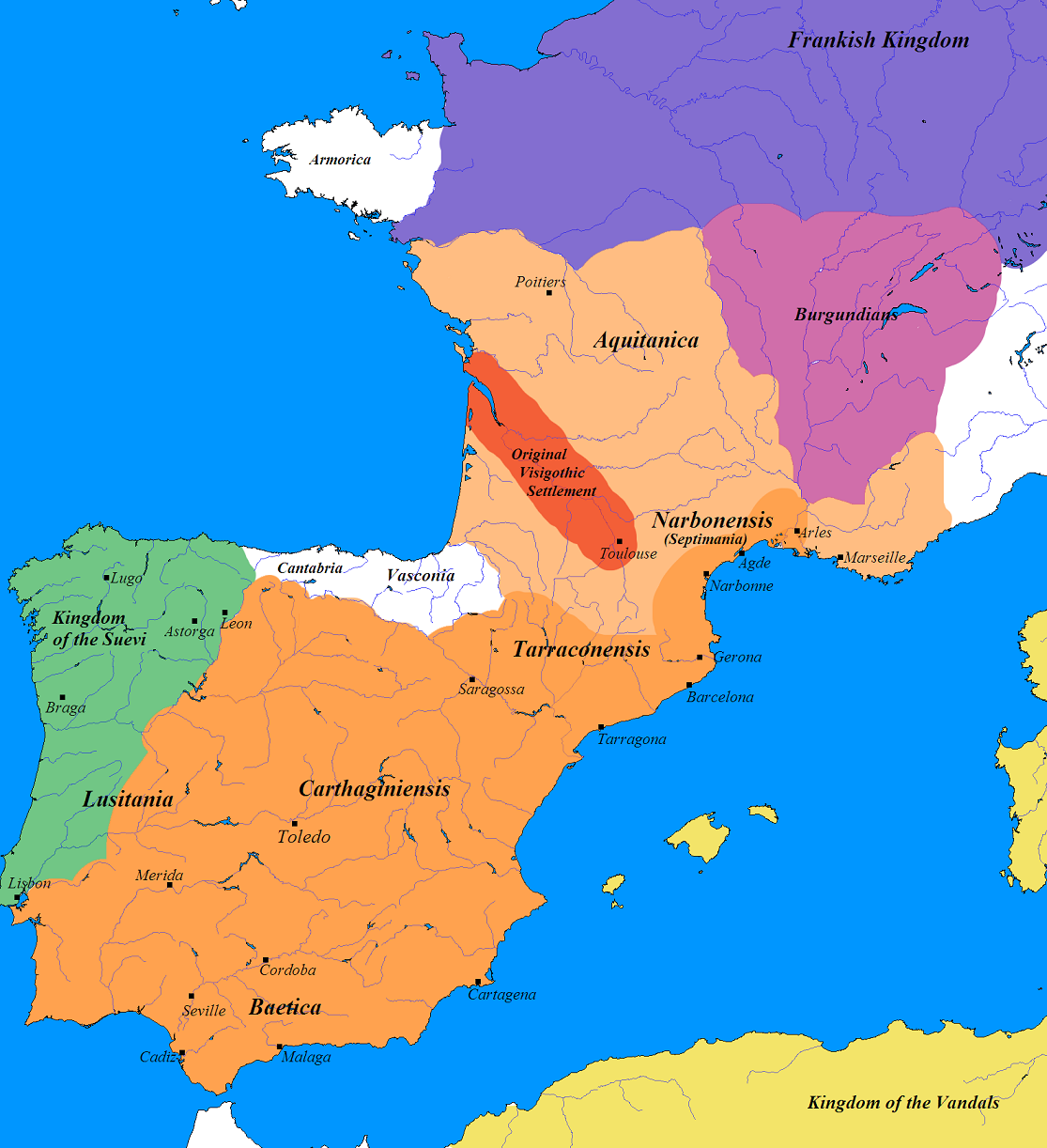
Kingdom of the Visigoths (orange), Kingdom of the Suebi (green), Kingdom of the Burgundians, Kingdom of the Franks (purple), Kingdom of the Vandals (yellow), c. 490

- 526, Raid against Gothic Gepidae by Byzantine General Belisarius.
- 533–534, Invasion of North Africa by the Byzantine Empire, Vandalic War.
  - 533, Battle of Ad Decimum, Capture of Carthage by the Byzantine Empire.
  - 533, Battle of Tricamarum, Destruction of the Vandal Kingdom by the Byzantine Empire, Fall of the Kingdom of the Vandals.
- 535–554, Invasion of Italy by the Byzantine Empire, Ostrogothic War.
  - 535, Capture of Sicily by Byzantine General Belisarius.
  - 536, Capture of Naples and Rome by Byzantine General Belisarius.
  - 537–538, Siege of Rome by Ostrogoths.
  - 538, Siege of Ariminum by Ostrogoths.
  - 539 Destruction of Mediolanum by the Ostrogoths under Uraias; Belisarius captures Auximus
  - 540, Capture of Ravenna, the Ostrogothic capital, by Byzantine General Belisarius, including King Witiges.
  - 541–542, Bubonic plague wipes out most of the farming community of the former Roman Empire and leaving dead an estimated 25 million people across the world.
  - 541–544, Recapture of Northern Italy by Ostrogoths, after the Battle of Treviso.
    - 542, Battle of Faventia, Battle of Mucellium.
    - 543, Siege of Naples.
  - 546, Sack of Rome by Ostrogoths.
  - c. 548, Recapture of Rome by the Byzantine Empire.
  - 549–550, Siege and Capture of Rome by Ostrogoths.
  - 551, Battle of Sena Gallica, Capture of Ostrogothic chieftain Gibal, Demoralization of Gothic army.
  - 552, Byzantine Empire with aid of the Heruli and Lombards defeat the Ostrogoths in the Battle of Taginae, Ostrogothic King Totila dies on the run, Defeat of Gothic Gepids in the Battle of Asfeld against Lombards (Longbeards), Gepid King Thurisind dies in battle.
  - 552–553, Capture of Rome and Siege of Cumae by Byzantine General Narses, Battle of Mons Lactarius, Ostrogothic king Teia dies in battle, Fall of the Ostrogothic Kingdom.

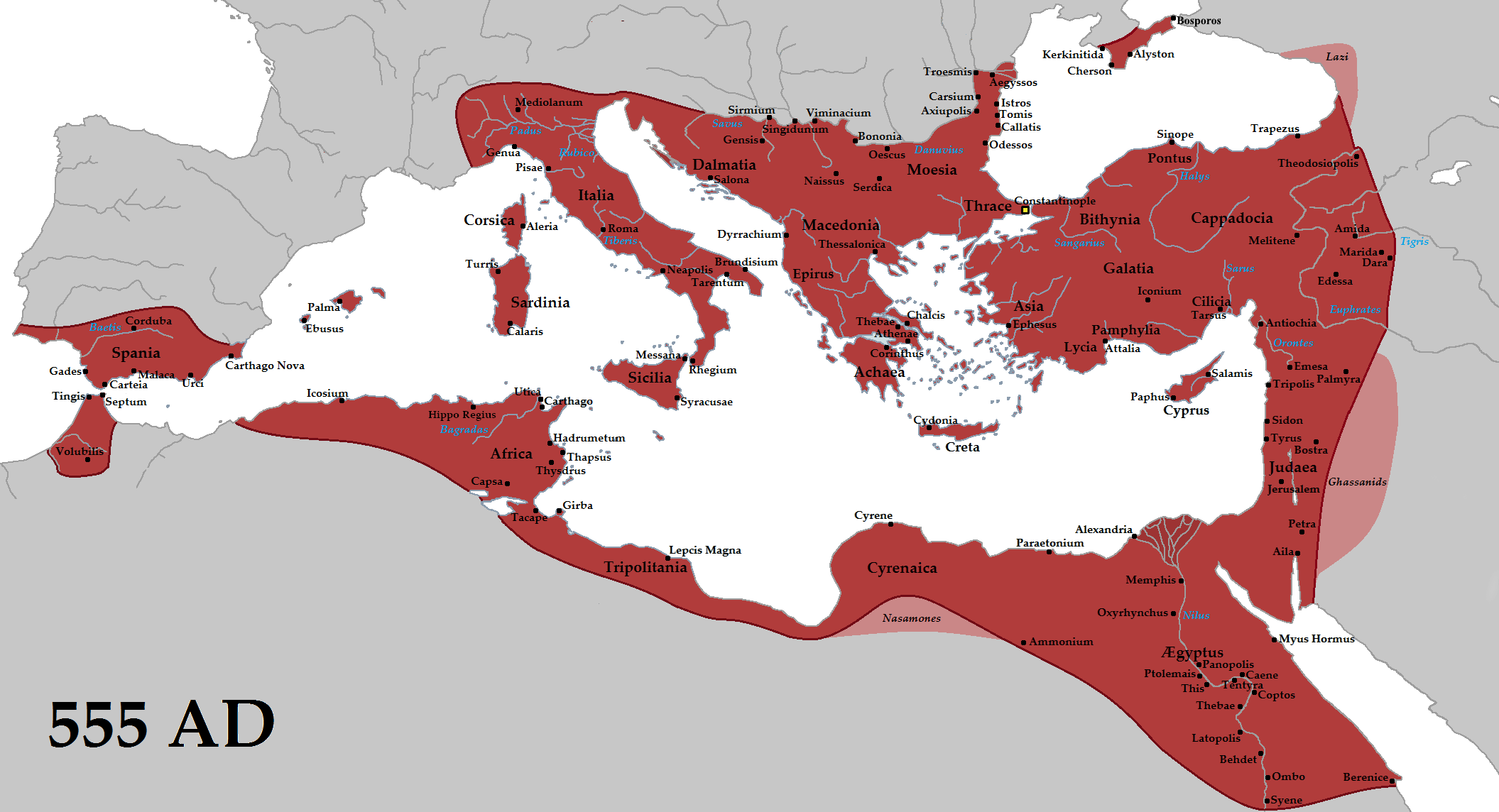
The Byzantine Empire at the end of Antiquity in 555 AD

- 552, Justinian sends a force of 2,000 men, led by Liberius, against the Visigoths in Hispania. Conquest of Cartagena and other cities on the southeastern coast and foundation of the new province of Spania.
- 554, Byzantine General Narses defeats the Franks and Alemanni in the Battle of the Volturnus.
- c. 558–561, Failed Uprising of the Ostrogoth Widin.
- 567, Lombards decisively defeat the Gepids, Gepid King Cunimund dies in battle, Fall of the Kingdom of the Gepidae.
- 568–c. 572, Invasion of Italy by a confederation of Lombards, a Germanic people that had been previously allied with the Byzantine Empire from Pannonia and Bavarians, Gepids, Suebi, Heruls, Thuringians, Saxons, Ostrogoths and Rugii. Longbeards (Lombards) establish kingdoms in Northern Italy (Langobardia Major) and in Southern Italy (Langobardia Minor).
  - 569, Seizure of Cividale del Friuli, Vicenza, Verona, Brescia and Mediolanum by Lombards.
  - 570–572, Siege of Ticinum, Seizure of Tuscany by Lombards. Faroald and Zotto found the Duchies of Spoleto and Benevento.
- 585, King Autari, led the Byzantines to ask, for the first time since the Lombards had entered Italy, for a truce. The territories which remained under Byzantine control were called "Romania" (today's Italian region of Romagna) in northeastern Italy and had its stronghold in the Exarchate of Ravenna, including Rome.

=== Eighth century ===
- 751, the Lombards conquer Ravenna, but Pope Stephen II controlled the territories of Rome, Sicily, Sardinia and others.
- 751–756, just when it seemed Aistulf was able to defeat all opposition on Italian soil, Pepin the Short, the old enemy of the usurpers of Liutprand's family, finally managed to overthrow the Merovingian dynasty in Gaul, deposing Childeric III and becoming king de jure as well as de facto. The support Pepin enjoyed from the papacy was decisive. Because of the threat this move represented for the new king of the Franks, an agreement between Pepin and Stephen II settled, in exchange for the formal royal anointing, the descent of the Franks in Italy.
- In 754, the Lombard army, deployed in defence of the Locks in Val di Susa, was defeated by the Franks. Aistulf, perched in Pavia, had to accept a treaty that required the delivery of hostages and territorial concessions, but two years later resumed the war against the pope, who in turn called on the Franks. Defeated again, Aistulf had to accept much harsher conditions: Ravenna was returned not to the Byzantines, but to the pope, increasing the core area of the Patrimony of St. Peter; Aistulf had to accept a sort of Frankish protectorate, the loss of territorial continuity of his domains, and payment of substantial compensation. The duchies of Spoleto and Benevento were quick to ally themselves with the victors. Aistulf died in 756, shortly after this severe humiliation.
- In 772 CE, the Roman pope Adrian I, of the opposite party of Desiderius, reversed the delicate game of alliances, demanding the surrender of the area never ceded by Desiderius and thus causing him to resume the war against the cities of Romagna. Charlemagne, though he had just begun his campaign against the Saxons, came to the aid of the pope. He feared the capture of Rome by the Lombards and the consequent loss of prestige that would follow.
- Between 773 and 774 Charlemagne invaded Italy. Once again the defence of the Locks was ineffective, the fault of the divisions among the Lombards. Charlemagne, having prevailed against a tough resistance, captured the capital of the kingdom, Pavia. Charles then called himself Gratia Dei rex Francorum et Langobardorum ("By the grace of God king of the Franks and the Lombards"), realizing a personal union of the two kingdoms. Thus ended the Lombard Kingdom in Latin Italy, led by the Roman Pope Adrian I.

== See also ==
- Contact between Germanic tribes and the Roman Empire
- Gothic and Vandal warfare
- Anglo-Saxon warfare
- Furor Teutonicus
- Germanic Iron Age
- Germanic Heroic Age
- Timeline of Anglo-Saxon settlement in Britain
- Timeline of Germanic kingdoms in the Iberian peninsula
- Operation Achse
- Roman-Persian wars
