= Battle of Lake Benacus =

Battle during the Imperial Crisis and the Roman–Germanic wars (268/269)

Coordinates: 45.58060°N 10.62053°E

- Part of the Crisis of the Third Century; Roman–Alamanni conflict and Roman–Germanic Wars
- Battle of Lake Benacus (Italy)
Date	268 or early 269
Location	Lake Benacus, Italy, Roman Empire (present-day Lake Garda, Italy)
Result	Roman victory

Belligerents
Roman Empire	Alamanni

Commanders and leaders
Claudius II; Aurelian	Unknown

Strength
Unknown	Unknown

Casualties and losses
Unknown	Heavy

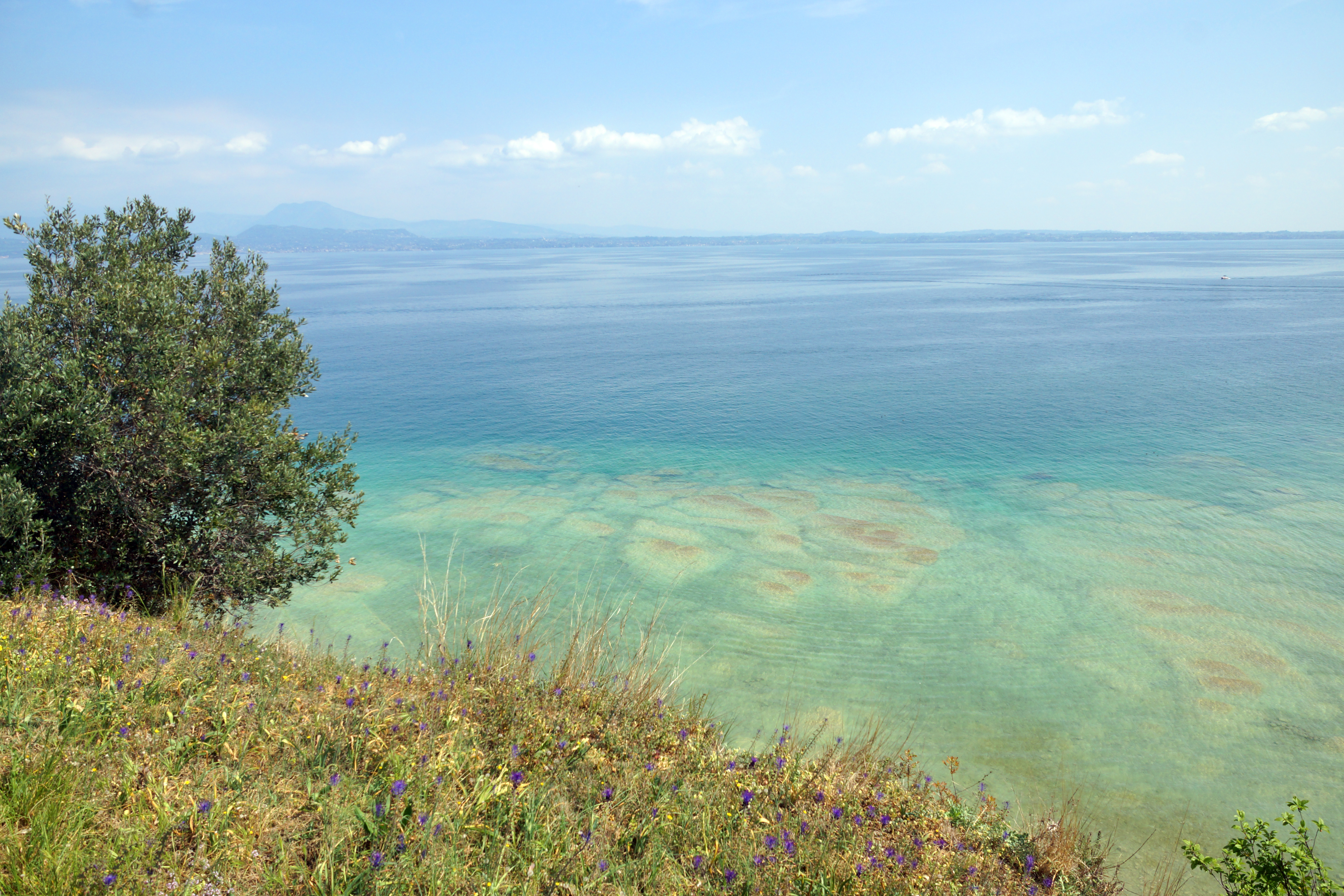
Lake Garda, the site of the battle

The Battle of Lake Benacus was fought along the banks of Lake Garda in northern Italy, which was known to the Romans as Benacus, in 268 or early 269, between the army under the command of the Roman Emperor Claudius II and the Germanic tribes of the Alamanni and Juthungi.

== Background ==
Ιn 268, the Alamanni, who had been making incursions into Roman territory since the reign of Marcus Aurelius, had broken through the Roman frontier at the Danube and crossed the Alps. The power struggles in Mediolanum due to Aureolus' revolt, the murder of Emperor Gallienus and the resulting confrontation between Aureolus and Claudius, who had been nominated as emperor by Gallienus on his death bed, forced the Romans to denude the frontier of troops. Having defeated and killed Aureolus in a siege on Mediolanum, Claudius led his army, together with the remnants of Aureolus' force, north to confront the Germans.

== Battle ==
Details of the battle are unknown, but future Emperor Aurelian was present at the battle. After what was described as a decisive victory, Claudius assumed the title Germanicus Maximus. Much of the German force was slaughtered on the field with the remainder retreating beyond the bounds of the Empire.

== Aftermath ==
Claudius returned to Rome after the battle to attend to affairs of state. The Alemanni returned to Italy in 271 and won a victory against Emperor Aurelian at the Battle of Placentia before their ultimate defeat in the Battle of Fano.
