= 356th =

356th may refer to:

- 356th Airlift Squadron (356 AS), part of the 433d Airlift Wing at Kelly Field Annex, Texas
- 356th Fighter Group, inactive United States Air Force organization
- 356th Tactical Fighter Squadron, inactive United States Air Force fighter squadron

== See also ==
- 356 (number)
- 356, the year 356 (CCCLVI) of the Julian calendar
- 356 BC
