= Battle of Thermopylae (254) =

Battle between Roman and Gothic forces (254)

Coordinates: 38°48′19″N 22°33′46″E

- Part of the Crisis of the Third Century; Gothic War (248-253) and Roman–Germanic Wars
Date	254 AD
Location	Thermopylae, Achaea, Roman Empire (present-day Thermopylae, Greece)
Result	Roman victory

Belligerents
Roman Empire	Goths

Commanders and leaders
Marianus; Philostratus; Dexippus	Unknown

Strength
Militia	Unknown

Casualties and losses
Unknown	Unknown

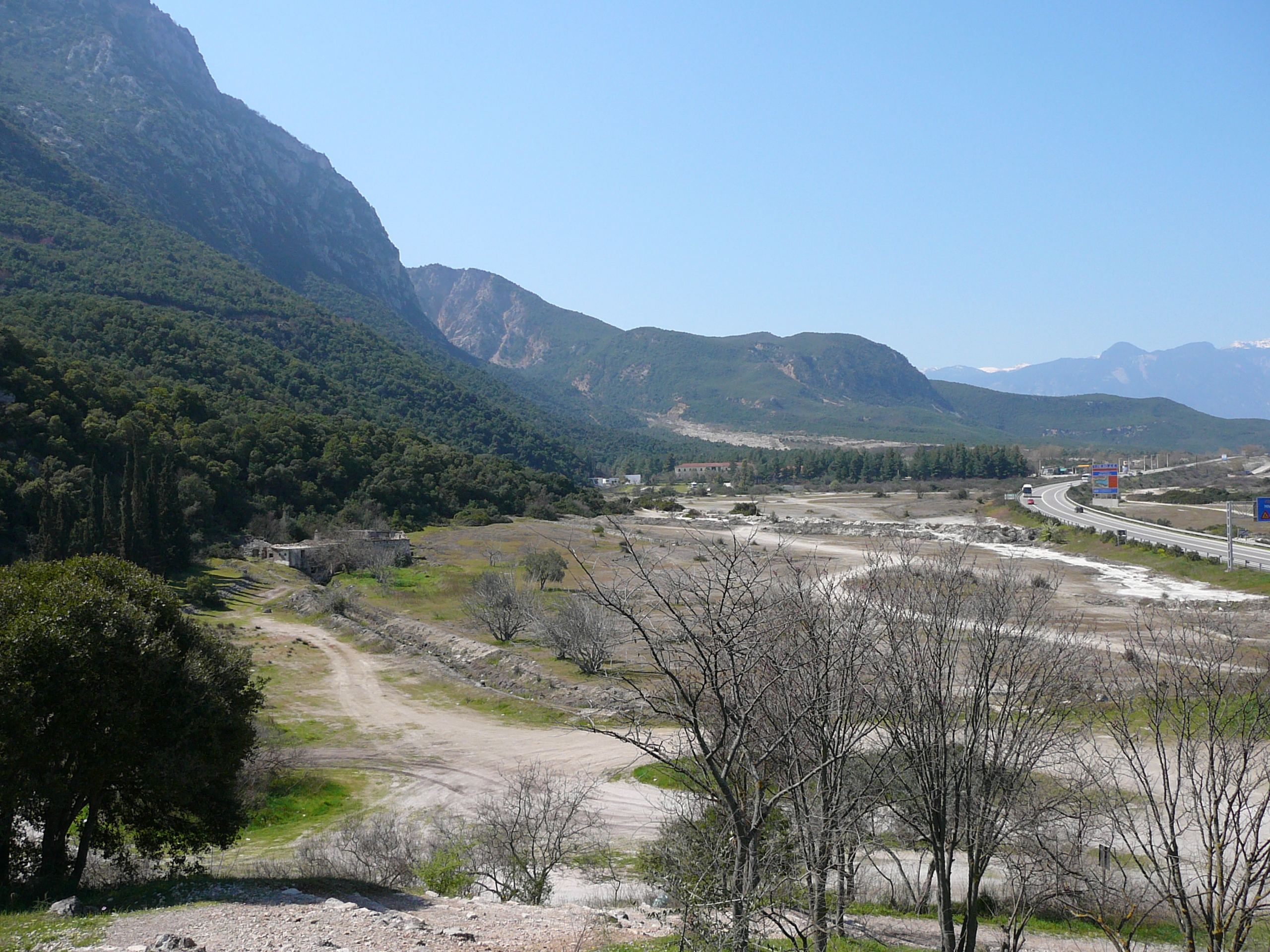
Thermopylae ancient coastline

The Battle of Thermopylae in 254 was a successful defense of the pass of Thermopylae by local Greek militia under Marianus, the Roman proconsul of Achaea, during an invasion of the Balkans by the Goths.

== Background ==
In 254 the Goths invaded and plundered Thrace and Macedonia. In 1979, Herwig Wolfram regarded 254 as the date, while Mallan and Davenport in 2015 suggested 262. Goltz and Hartmann estimated 254 as the date. David Potter in 2016 rejected Mallan and Davenport's estimate and dated it to either 253 or 259. The Goths attempted to storm Thessalonica with close order formations and assault columns. The Thessalonians mobilized to defend their city and beat off the attacks. The Goths abandoned the siege and moved off to invade Greece south of Thermopylae, seeking to loot the gold and silver wealth of Greek temples.

== Prelude ==
The Greeks learned of the Goths' approach and the Roman proconsul Marianus, the Athenian Philostratus, and the Boeotian Dexippus mobilized a militia to block the pass of Thermopylae. The militia were armed with bronze or iron-tipped wooden pikes, small spears, axes, and assorted weapons. They set to work fortifying the pass. Marianus gave a pre-battle speech to them, emphasizing the defense of the pass by previous generations of Greeks and Romans.

== Battle ==
The Graeco-Roman forces successfully blocked the Goths' way at Thermopylae and the Goths returned home, albeit with considerable loot.

== Aftermath ==
A fragment of text attributed to the contemporary historian Dexippus, discovered in Vienna in 2010, provides detail on the weapons, leadership, and geography of the engagement. The fragment cuts off before the battle's outcome. Dexippus was used as a source by the Byzantine chronicler George Syncellus, who mentioned the blocking of the pass and the Goths' return home with plunder.

== Bibliography ==
- Goltz, Andreas; Hartmann, Udo (2008). "Valerian und Gallienus". In Johne, Klaus-Peter (ed.). Die Zeit der Soldatenkaiser. Krise und Transformation des Römischen Reiches im 3. Jahrhundert n. Chr. (235–284) (in German). Berlin: Akademie Verlag. ISBN 978-3-05-004529-0.
- Mallan, Christopher; Davenport, Caillan (November 2015). "Dexippus and the Gothic Invasions: Interpreting the New Vienna Fragment". Journal of Roman Studies. 105: 203–226. doi:10.1017/s0075435815000970. S2CID 163234044.
- Potter, David (2016). "War as Theater, from Tacitus to Dexippus". In Riess, Werner; Fagan, Garrett G. (eds.). The Topography of Violence in the Greco-Roman World. Ann Arbor: University of Michigan Press. ISBN 978-0472119820.
- Wolfram, Herwig (1990) [1979]. Geschichte der Goten. Entwurf einer historischen Ethnographie [History of the Goths]. Translated by Dunlap, Thomas J. University of California Press. ISBN 978-0520069831.
