= Battle of the Lupia River =

Battle between the Romans and the Sicambri in the Ruhr Valley in 11 BC

- Part of the Roman campaigns in Germania (12 BC – AD 16), the Campaigns of Drusus and the Roman–Germanic Wars
Date	11 BC
Location	Lower Lippe River (present-day Lippe River)
Result	Roman victory

Belligerents
Roman Empire	Sicambri

Commanders and leaders
Drusus	Unknown

Strength
2000~	300~

Casualties and losses
100	250

The Battle of the Lupia River was fought in 11 BC between a Roman force led by Nero Claudius Drusus and the Sicambri. The Lupia River, now Lippe, flows westwards through the Ruhr Valley in North Rhine-Westphalia. Drusus defeated the Sicambri, and some of the defeated were moved to west of the Rhine River.

== Aftermath ==
Drusus began the construction of several strongholds to secure the area between the Lippe and the Rhine.
