= Battle of Pavia (271) =

Battle during Juthungian invasion of Italy (271)

Coordinates: 45.183333°N 9.15°E

- Part of the Crisis of the Third Century; Juthungian invasions of Italy and Roman–Germanic Wars
- Battle of Pavia (271) (Italy)
Date	271
Location	Ticinum, Pavia, Italy
Result	Roman victory; End of the Juthungian invasions of Italy

Belligerents
Roman Empire	Juthungi

Commanders and leaders
Emperor Aurelian	Unknown

The Battle of Pavia or Battle of Ticinum was fought in 271 near Ticinum (Pavia) in Italy, and resulted in the Emperor Aurelian destroying the retreating Juthungian army.

== Background ==
In 271, the Juthungi invaded Roman Italy. They defeated Aurelian's army at the Battle of Placentia but, on their way to attack the defenseless city of Rome, they were repulsed by the imperial army at the Battle of Fano. The Juthungi then asked for peace but Aurelian rejected their demand for safe passage. Trying to force their way back to their homelands, they headed north using the Via Aemilia. Aurelian wanted a decisive victory in order to restore his damaged reputation after the loss at Placentia as well as to recover the plunder the Juthungi were carrying. Therefore, he went in pursuit of the invaders, waiting for the best moment to attack.

== Battle ==
Aurelian attacked the Juthungi while they were entering the open plains near Ticinum (Pavia). He was able to destroy their entire force, except for a column that escaped through the Alps. However, this remnant force was later caught by Aurelian in Raetia and was eliminated.

== Aftermath ==
For the victory, Aurelian assumed the title of honour Germanicus Maximus. His victories ended the Juthungi invasion, but the Roman citizenry were shocked by the great threat that Rome itself had faced after the loss near Placentia. However, the menace of the Germanic people and a Germanic invasion was still perceived by the Romans as likely. In response, Aurelian resolved to build a new system of walls around Rome that became known as the Aurelian Walls. Portions of this wall can still be seen in Rome today.
