= Battle of Brumath =

Battle in 356 CE

Coordinates: 48.732778°N 7.709167°E

- Part of the Roman–Alamanni conflict and Roman–Germanic Wars
Date	356 AD
Location	Brocomagus, Gallia Lugdunensis (modern-day Bas-Rhin, Alsace, France)
Result	Roman victory

Belligerents
Western Roman Empire	Alamanni

Commanders and leaders
Julian	Unknown

Strength
13,000	Unknown

Casualties and losses
Unknown	Unknown

The Battle of Brumath in 356 AD was part of Roman Emperor Julian's campaigns against the Germanic tribes. Following the Battle of Reims, Julian's forces pursued several Germanic war bands through the Gallic countryside. Outside Brocomagus (Brumath), one war band met Julian in open battle and the Romans were victorious.

Hearing therefore that Strasburg, Brumath, Saverne, Seltz, Speyer, Worms, and Mayence were held by the savages, who were living on their lands (for the towns themselves they avoid as if they were tombs surrounded by nets), he first of all seized Brumath, but while he was still approaching it a band of Germans met him and offered battle. Julian drew up his forces in the form of a crescent, and when the fight began to come to close quarters, the enemy were overwhelmed by a double danger; some were captured, others were slain in the very heat of the battle, and rest got away, saved by recourse to speed.

Although casualties were not numerous, the Germanic defeat was sufficiently great to have a deterrent effect on other tribal groups in the area, and to partially restore order.

Following Brumath, Julian went on to re-occupy Cologne (Colonia Claudia Ara Agrippinensium), and then went into winter quarters in Senonae, modern Sens, where he was besieged by Frankish forces.
