= Frankish War (441–446) =

Frankische Oorlog 441-446
- Part of Fall of the Roman Empire
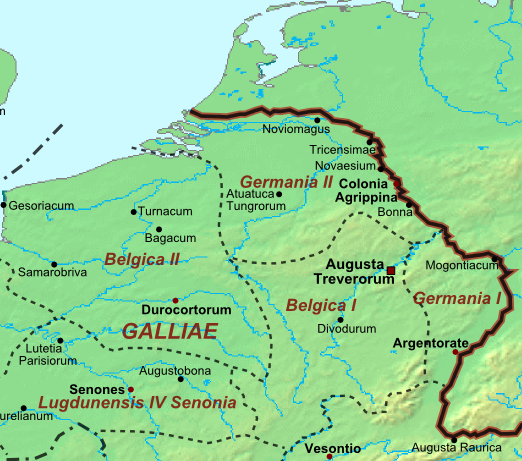
- North Gaul and Germania
Date	441–446
Location	Belgica Secunda and Germania Secunda
Result	Roman victory

Belligerents
Ripuarian and Salian Franks	Western Roman Empire

Commanders and leaders
Chlodio	Aëtius

Strength
10,000–15,000	40,000

Casualties and losses
Unknown	Unknown

Frankish War (441–446) was a multi-year military conflict in the provinces of Germania II and Belgica I during the reign of Emperor Valentinian. In addition to the Western Roman Empire, the two tribal associations of the Franks were involved: the Salian Franks and the Ripuarian Franks. The main players in this conflict were Flavius Aetius and Chlodio.

== Sources and interpretation ==
The most important contemporary source for this war is the Chronica Gallica of 452. This chronicle has the disadvantage that the order and dating of the events between 441 and 450 are uncertain and open to multiple interpretations. This article follows Syvänne's reconstruction of the events.

== Background ==
It seems that when Aetius withdrew troops from Gaul during the Vandal War (439-442) to deploy against the Vandals, the Salian Franks exploited this situation by taking possession of the Roman territory up to Cambrai. The Ripuarian Franks also took advantage of the situation and invaded Germania Prima. Cologne and Trier were taken by them in 441. According to Salvianus, the citizens of the city had only themselves to blame for this. After an earlier occupation by the Franks, they were more concerned with the restoration of the circus than spending money to better defend the city. As a result, the city was conquered and plundered for a fourth time. The fact that the Ripuarian Franks were able to conquer Trier means that they first overwhelmed the Burgundian foederati on the Limes to get there.

Expansion of Frankish territory between 440 and 446

== Course of the war ==
=== Revolt of the Armoricans ===
A shadowy period followed because written sources provide no information. From the surviving sources it can be deduced that the Roman government demanded that the inhabitants of Armorica, a semi-autonomous territory, contribute more to the defense of northwestern Gaul. However, they refused to provide manpower for the army and a revolt broke out under a leader named Tibatto. In response, Aëtius ordered the mobile army of the Alans, stationed at Valence, to attack the Armoricans (referred to in the sources as Bagaudae).

Germanus, the bishop of Auxerre, attempted to mediate in this conflict, but Tibatto's attack on Tours, which was ably defended in the summer of 442 by the future emperor Majorian, resulted in all-out war. With the remaining Gallic army now operating against the Bacaudae with Alan auxiliaries, this then allowed the Salian Franks to push their frontier back to the Somme. From Toxandria Chlodio marched south and captured the garrison towns of Tournai and Cambrai.

=== Interruption of the war ===
The peace agreement with the Vandals allowed Aetius to deploy his army against the Ripuarian Franks at the end of 442. He led this army himself and advanced north from Italy. Aetius' operations in Gaul were prematurely halted when the Huns, under two new leaders Bleda and Attila, turned their attention westwards in 443/4 after defeating the Eastern Romans. For Aetius this was a greater danger than the advance of the Franks. He interrupted his campaign and formed a new line of defense by bringing the Burgundian foederati south and settling them in Sapaudia (Savoy).

No events are known between 443 and 444, but it may be assumed that Aetius' defensive arrangements had worked, with the result that the Franks had not advanced any further and the Bagaudae in Armorica had been destroyed by the Alans.

=== Continuation and battle of Vicus Helena ===
In 445 the inevitable Roman counterattack came. Aetius returned from the Danube after a successful campaign against the Huns. He resumed the war by leading the campaigns against the Franks himself, while at the same time another Roman army went to war in Spain against the Suevi. With his usual force he defeated the Ripuarians in 445. According to Syvänne, a panegyric by Merobaudes relates to this period and Aetius first liberated the cities of Trier and Cologne after which he defeated the Franks at a fortified hill after a battle or ambush. It is noteworthy that he also appointed new bishops with a military background in Gaul that year.

After Aetius had subdued the Ripuarian Franks, he marched north to attack the Salian Franks. According to a panegyric by Siodonius Apollaris, he managed to force the Frankish king Chlodio to surrender by ambushing his army at the settlement of Vicus Helena.

== Aftermath ==
According to Syvänne, Chlodio was killed in the Battle of Vicus Helena, or died soon after. He was succeeded by his son Merovech. Aetius' victory was so complete that the Franks once again recognized Roman supremacy. Aetius celebrated his victories over the Franks by issuing coins that were struck in the mint of Trier in 445/6. On 1 January 446 he was in Rome to celebrate his third consulate. Peace returned to the northern provinces. The area remained in Roman hands until 455. Border control was left to the Franks, who also supplied many recruits to the Roman army in Gaul.

== Primary sources ==
- Chronica Gallica of 452
- Renatus Profuturus Frigeridus, Gallic historian
- Salvianus, Gallic writer
- Gregory of Tours, Gallic bishop
- Merobaudes, Roman general and author of Panegyricus
- Sidonius Apollinaris, Gallic poet of panegryric
