= Clades Lolliana =

Battle in the Germanic Wars

- Part of the Germanic Wars
Date	16 BC
Location	Rhine shores
Result	Germanic victory

Belligerents
Sicambri; Usipetes; Tencteri	Roman Empire

Commanders and leaders
Unknown	Marcus Lollius

Units involved
Unknown	Unknown

Strength
Unknown	Unknown

Casualties and losses
Unknown	1 legionary eagle

The clades Lolliana or Lollian disaster was a battle in 16 BC, when the consul Marcus Lollius was defeated by the Sicambri, Usipetes and Tencteri, Germanic tribes who had crossed the Rhine. This defeat is coupled by the historian Suetonius with the disaster of Publius Quinctilius Varus in the Battle of the Teutoburg Forest.

After capturing and crucifying Romans in their own lands, the three Germanic tribes crossed the Rhine and plundered Roman territory. Roman cavalry were ambushed and routed. While pursuing the cavalry, the Germani came across the Roman governor Lollius and defeated him as well. They captured the eagle of the fifth legion. When Lollius and Augustus began to assemble armies, the Germani retreated back to their own lands, made peace and gave hostages.

== See also ==
- Chronology of warfare between the Romans and Germanic tribes
