= Siege of Thessalonica (254) =

Conflict between Roman and Gothic forces (254)

- Part of the Crisis of the Third Century; Gothic War (248-253) and Roman–Germanic Wars
| Date | 254 AD |
| Location | Thessalonica, Macedonia, Roman Empire (present-day Macedonia, Thessaloniki, Greece) 40°38′00″N 22°57′00″E |
| Result | Roman victory |

Belligerents
| Roman Empire | Goths |

Commanders and leaders
| Unknown | Unknown |

Strength
| Garrison; Militia | Unknown |
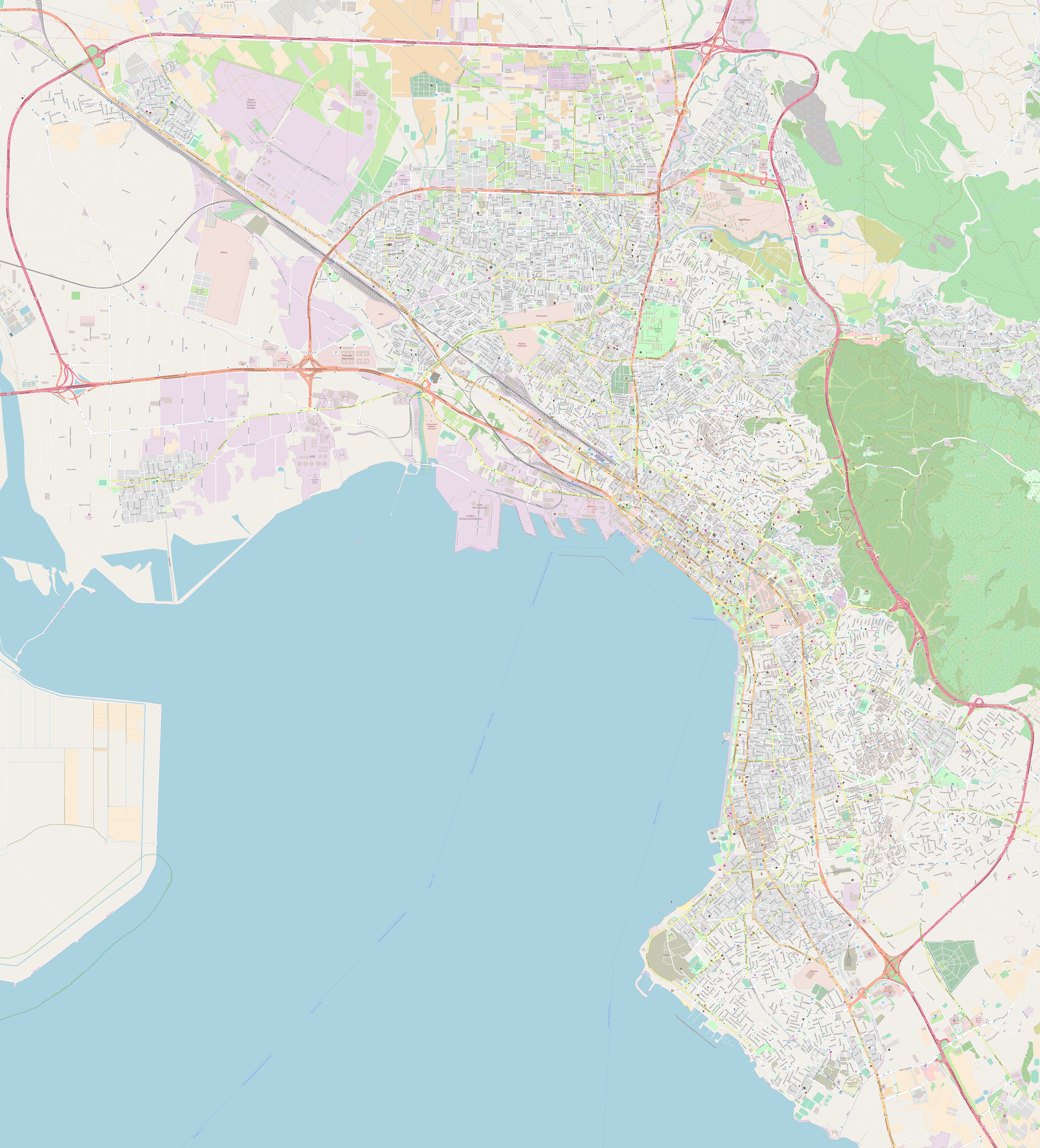
- Location within the Thessaloniki urban area Siege of Thessalonica (254) (Greece)

The siege of Thessalonica in 254 was a successful defense of the city of Thessalonica by local Roman militia during an invasion of the Balkans by the Goths.

== Background ==
In 254 the Goths invaded and plundered Thrace and Macedonia. In 1979, Herwig Wolfram regarded 254 as the date, while Mallan and Davenport in 2015 suggested 262. Goltz and Hartmann estimated 254 as the date. David Potter in 2016 rejected Mallan and Davenport's estimate and dated it to either 253 or 259.

== Siege ==
The Goths attempted to storm Thessalonica in close order formations and assault columns. The Thessalonicans rallied to defend the city walls and defeated the attacks.

According to Victor Duruy, Valens Thessalonicus, who later briefly became emperor, may have lifted the siege of Thessalonica, as suggested by Ammianus Marcellinus, who refers to him by the surname "Thessalonicus".

== Aftermath ==
The Goths abandoned the siege and moved on to invade Greece south of Thermopylae, seeking to loot the gold and silver wealth of Greek temples. The siege was recorded by the contemporary historian Dexippus. A fragment of his work, discovered in Vienna in 2010, specifies the involvement of the citizens in the defense.

== Bibliography ==
- Duruy, Victor (1879). Histoire des Romains depuis les temps les plus reculés jusqu'à la fin du règne des Antonins (in French). Hachette.
- Goltz, Andreas; Hartmann, Udo (2008). "Valerian und Gallienus". In Johne, Klaus-Peter (ed.). Die Zeit der Soldatenkaiser. Krise und Transformation des Römischen Reiches im 3. Jahrhundert n. Chr. (235–284) (in German). Berlin: Akademie Verlag. ISBN 978-3-05-004529-0.
- Mallan, Christopher; Davenport, Caillan (November 2015). "Dexippus and the Gothic Invasions: Interpreting the New Vienna Fragment". Journal of Roman Studies. 105: 203–226. doi:10.1017/s0075435815000970. S2CID 163234044.
- Potter, David (2016). "War as Theater, from Tacitus to Dexippus". In Riess, Werner; Fagan, Garrett G. (eds.). The Topography of Violence in the Greco-Roman World. Ann Arbor: University of Michigan Press. ISBN 978-0472119820.
- Wolfram, Herwig (1990) [1979]. Geschichte der Goten. Entwurf einer historischen Ethnographie [History of the Goths]. Translated by Dunlap, Thomas J. University of California Press. ISBN 978-0520069831.
