= Siege of Asti (402) =

Siege by Visigoths in 402

- Part of the Gothic War of 401–403 and Roman–Germanic Wars
Date	402
Location	Asti, Western Roman Empire
Result	Roman victory

Belligerents
Western Roman Empire	Visigoths

Commanders and leaders
Stilicho	Alaric I

The siege of Asti was a siege in 402, laid by the Visigoths under their king Alaric I after the Visigothic invasion of Northern Italy.

Emperor Honorius fled the Imperial capital in Mediolanum upon the rapid advance of the Goths through northern Italy. His original intent of escaping to Arles was foiled by an advanced Gothic party which blocked his western march. Pursued by the invaders, the Emperor with his retinue fled instead to Asti, then named Hasta. The Goths placed Hasta under siege until March when General Stilicho, bringing reinforcements from the Rhine, forced them to lift the siege and retreat to a more convenient terrain in Pollentia, where they battled the Roman army.
