= Battle of Durocortorum =

Battle between Roman and Alemanni forces (356)

Coordinates: 49.145556°N 4.0225°E

- Part of the Roman–Alamanni conflict and Roman–Germanic Wars
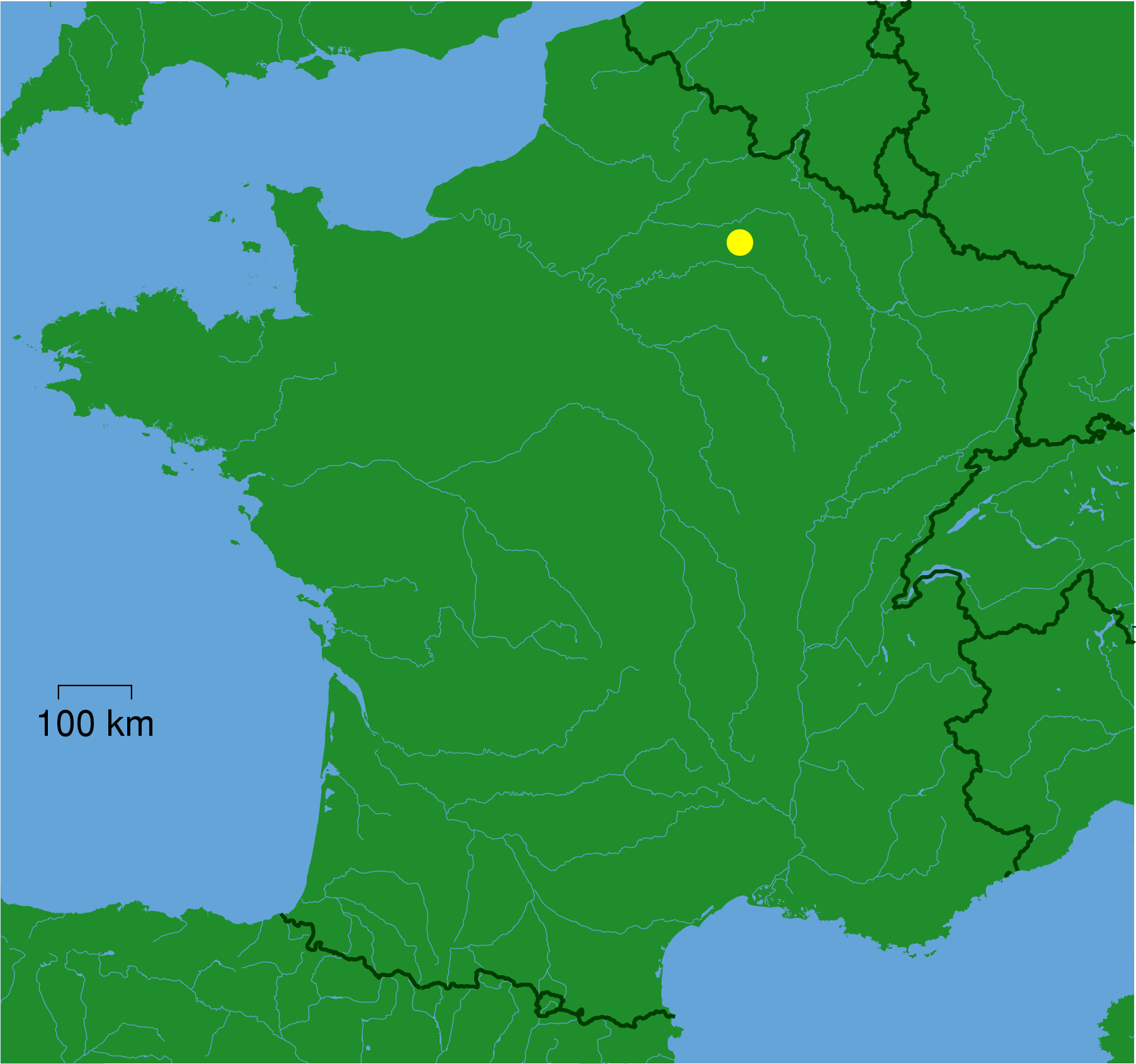
- Location of Reims (yellow)
Date	356 AD
Location	Reims (modern-day France)
Result	Alamanni victory

Belligerents
Western Roman Empire	Alamanni

Commanders and leaders
Julian	Unknown

Strength
Unknown	Unknown

Casualties and losses
Unknown	Unknown

The Battle of Reims or Battle of Durocortorum was fought in 356 between the Western Roman army led by Western Roman emperor Julian and the Alamanni. The Alamanni were victorious.

And after staying there [ Troyes (Augustobona Tricassium)] a short time, out of consideration for this tired soldiers, he felt that he ought not to delay, and made for the city of Rheims (Durocortōrum). There he had ordered the whole army to assemble with provisions for a month and to await his coming; the place was commanded by Ursicinus' successor Marcellus, and Ursicinus himself was directed to serve in the same region until the end of the campaign. Accordingly, after the expression of many various opinions, it was agreed to attack the Alamannic horde by way of the Ten Cantons [ Dieuze] with closed ranks; and the soldiers went on in that direction with unusual alacrity. And because the day was misty and overcast, so then even objects close at hand could not be seen, the enemy, aided by their acquaintance with the country, went around by way of a crossroad and made an attack on the two legions bringing up the rear of the Caesar's army. And they would nearly have annihilated them, had not the shouts that they suddenly raised brought up the reinforcements of our allies. Then and thereafter, thinking that he could cross neither roads nor rivers without ambuscades, Julian was wary and hesitant,

Following this Julian went on to fight and win the Battle of Brumath (Brocomagus).

== Sources ==
- Goldsworthy, Adrian (2004). In the Name of Rome: The Men Who Won the Roman Empire. London: Weidenfeld & Nicolson. p. 344. ISBN 0-297-84666-3.
