= Battle of Vindonissa =

Battle between Roman and Alemanni forces (298/302)

- Part of the Roman–Alamanni conflict and Roman–Germanic Wars
Date	298
Location	Vindonissa, modern Switzerland 47°28′00″N 8°13′00″E
Result	Roman victory

Belligerents
Western Roman Empire	Alamanni

Commanders and leaders
Constantius Chlorus	Unknown
- Location within Switzerland Battle of Vindonissa (Europe)

The Battle of Vindonissa was fought in 298 or 302 between the Imperial Roman army, led by Emperor Constantius Chlorus, and the Alemanni. The Romans won the battle, fought in Vindonissa, strengthening Rome's defenses along the Rhine.
