= Battle of Lingones =

Battle between Roman and Alamannic forces near Langres

- Part of Roman–Alamannic conflicts
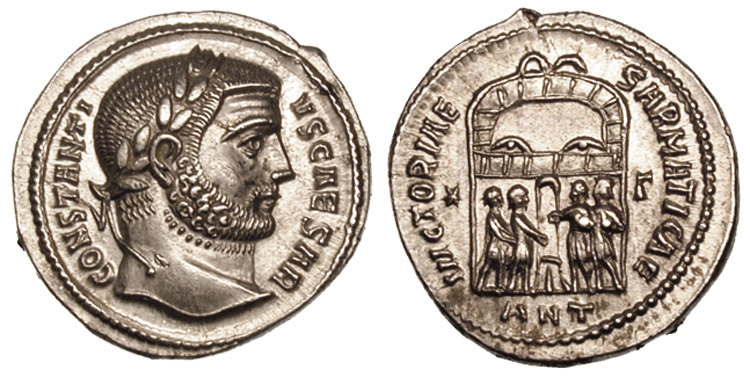
- Coin depicting Constantius Chlorus, who served as Caesar from 293 to 305
Date	c. 298
Location	Near Lingones, modern Langres, France
Result	Roman victory

Belligerents
Roman Empire	Alamanni

Commanders and leaders
Constantius Chlorus	Unknown

Strength
Unknown	Unknown

Casualties and losses
Unknown	Heavy (reported; exact number uncertain)

The Battle of Lingones was fought near Lingones, close to modern Langres in northeastern France, between Roman forces commanded by Constantius Chlorus and the Alamanni, a Germanic people. The engagement is generally dated to around 298, during the reign of Diocletian and the period of the Tetrarchy. The Romans ultimately defeated the Alamanni, according to the account of the Roman historian Eutropius.

== Background ==
During the late third century, the Roman Empire faced incursions by Germanic groups along its Rhine frontier. Constantius Chlorus, appointed Caesar by Diocletian in 293, was responsible for defending and restoring Roman authority in the western provinces, including Gaul.

The Alamanni crossed into Roman territory and advanced toward the area around Lingones. The surviving accounts provide limited information about the size of the invading force and the circumstances that led to the engagement.

== Battle ==
According to Eutropius, Constantius was initially surprised by the Alamanni and forced to retreat into the city of Lingones. The gates had already been closed, so he was reportedly pulled over the city walls with ropes. His army subsequently arrived, allowing him to resume the fight against the attackers.

Eutropius states that the Romans defeated the Alamanni shortly afterward and reports that approximately 60,000 were killed. This figure comes from an ancient narrative and should be treated cautiously, as the precise number of casualties cannot be independently established from the surviving evidence.

== Aftermath ==
The Roman victory formed part of Constantius Chlorus's military efforts to secure Gaul against incursions across the Rhine. Ancient sources provide few details about the immediate consequences of the battle, but the engagement is commonly discussed among the Roman–Alamannic conflicts of the late third century.
