= Marcellus (magister equitum) =

Roman army officer

Marcellus was a Roman general, magister equitum (master of horse), in Gaul, appointed by the Emperor Constantius II to replace Ursicinus around 356. He was accused of cowardice and dismissed from service when he failed to assist the Caesar Julian when Julian was besieged in Senonae.

Marcellus appealed to the Emperor in Milan, attempting to accuse Julian of treason, but his charges were contradicted by Julian's chamberlain, Eutherius, whom Julian had secretly sent in advance to head off Marcellus. Following this, Constantius had Marcellus exiled to his native town of Serdica. It is believed that he lived long enough there to suffer the execution of his son on charges of treason.
