= Siege of Autun (356) =

Conflict between Roman and Alemanni forces (356)

Coordinates: 46.95°N 4.3°E

- Part of the Roman–Alamanni conflict and Roman–Germanic Wars
Date	356 AD
Location	Autun, Gallia Lugdunensis (modern-day France)
Result	Roman victory

Belligerents
Western Roman Empire	Alamanni

Commanders and leaders
Julian	Unknown

Strength
Unknown	Unknown

Casualties and losses
Unknown	Unknown

The siege of Autun was a conflict fought between the Roman Empire and the invading barbarian Alamanni tribe, who were ravaging Gaul, in 356 AD. The Romans successfully defended the city, and the barbarians retreated on the approach of reinforcements.

== Background ==
During the Roman civil war of 350–353, Emperor Constantius II sought to increase pressure on his rival Magnentius by urging the Alemannic confederation to cross the Rhine and invade Magnentius' dominions in Gaul. The scheme was successful; the tribes under the command of Chnodomar and his allies invaded Gaul, defeating Caesar Decentius (Magnentius' brother) in the field, and besieging him in Sens. At the conclusion of the civil war, however, the Alemani declined to yield their conquests to the emperor, though he had granted them a commission to attack exclusively the rebels. Constantius entrusted Silvanus with driving the barbarians from Gaul and restoring Roman authority there. After the latter's revolt in early 355 AD, Constantitus elevated his cousin Julian to the title of Caesar of the Western Roman Empire on 6 November, 355. On the first day of December, Julian was sent from Mediolanum to assume his command. He resided in Vienne, on the Rhône river, during the winter of 355–356.

== Autun ==
In 356, as soon as the campaign season had begun, Julian received a report that the city of Autun, the capital of the Aedui, was under siege by a sizable army of Alemanni. Though the ancient town boasted a vast extent of walls, these were in a state of some disrepair, and consequently the city's regular garrison, despairing of defense, had abandoned their posts. Only the patriotic valor of a band of veterans residing in the city preserved the inhabitants from the ravages of the Alemans. Though he had no previous experience of arms or warfare, Julian at once advanced to lift the siege, arriving on 24 June. The barbarians retreated upon his approach.
