= Battle of Vicus Helena =

Battle between Romans and Franks

- Part of the Fall of the Roman Empire and Roman–Germanic Wars
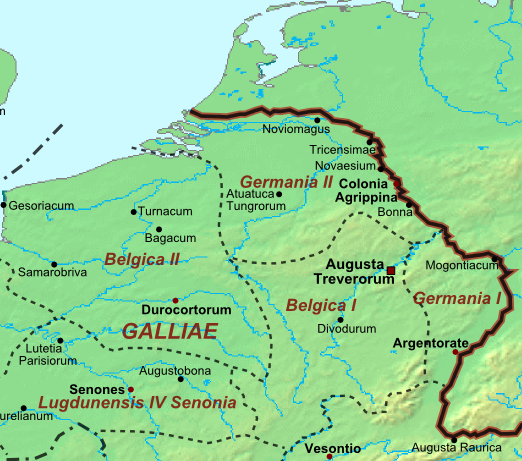
- The battle took place somewhere in Belgica II
Date	c. 445–450
Location	Vicus Helena, Belgica Secunda
Result	Roman victory

Belligerents
Western Roman Empire	Franks

Commanders and leaders
Flavius Aetius; Julius Majorian	Chlodio

The Battle of Vicus Helena was a clash between the Franks, led by Chlodio, and Roman soldiers, commanded by general Flavius Aetius. The battle is attested in a limited number of late Roman and early Medieval sources, having occurred around the year 448, in an unidentified location named Vicus Helena, somewhere in the Civitas Atrebatium, modern Artois.

== Reconstruction ==
=== Context ===
The Franks were foederati of the Romans, but regularly plundered towns and villages within the Roman Empire, and somewhere between 445 and 450, Salian Franks under Chlodio conquered the cities of Turnacum (modern Tournai) and Cameracum (Cambrai), which became centres of Frankish power. The capture of Cameracum must have happened after 443, because Gregory mentions the Burgundians had already settled east of the river Rhône. Next, the Franks expanded towards the river Somme. Around 448, the city of Nemetocenna (modern Arras) was probably sacked by the Franks as well.

=== Battle ===
Roman general Majorian, who would become the Western Roman emperor in 457, reportedly suppressed a revolt of the Bagaudae in Armorica in 448, and then successfully defended Turonum (Tours) against a siege. 'Shortly thereafter', according to Sidonius, the Franks led by 'Cloio' (Chlodio), who were holding a wedding reception, were ambushed by the Romans near Vicus Helena. Aetius directed the operations while Majorian fought with the cavalry. The Romans emerged victorious.

=== Sources ===
Most surviving information about the Battle of Vicus Helena comes from the Panegyric to Majorian, written in praise of Majorian's military exploits in 458 by Sidonius Apollinaris:

Cum bella timentes defendit Turonos, aberas. Post tempore parvo pugnastis pariter, Francus qua Cloio patentes Atrebatum terras pervaserat. Hic coeuntes claudebant angusta vias arcuque subactum vicum Helenam flumenque simul sub tramite longo artus suppositis trabibus transmiserat agger. Illic te posito pugnabat ponte sub ipso Maiorianus eques. Fors ripae colle propinquo Barbaricus resonabat hymen, Scythicisque choreis nubebat flavo similars nove nupta marito. Hos ergo, ut perhibent, stravit; crepitabat ad ictus cassis et oppositis hastarum verbera thorax arcebat squamis, donec conversa fugatus hostis terga dedit.

When [Majorian] defended the inhabitants of Tours who feared the war, you [=Aetius] were absent. Shortly thereafter, reunited, you fought the Frank Cloio, who had occupied the plains of the Atrebates. Here, various roads came together narrowed by a defile; next, Vicus Helena could be seen forming an arc, then one could find a river crossed by a bridge made of wooden planks. You [=Aetius] were there; Majorian the knight fought at the head of the bridge. Here was heard, resounding on the next hill, the songs of a wedding celebrated by the barbarians dancing in the manner of the Scythians; two spouses with blonde hair then united. [Majorian], as is reported, defeated the barbarians. His helmet sounded under the blows, and the spears were pushed back by his thick-mesh cuirass, until at last the enemy gave way, disbanded, and fled.

— Sidonius Apollinaris, Panegyric to Majorian (Carmen 5, 210–218.)

Some circumstantial information is provided by Gregory of Tours in his History of the Franks (Book 2, Chapter 9).

== Location and date ==
For centuries, scholars have not been able to locate Vicus Helena, nor been able to determine the precise date of the battle. In The History of the Decline and Fall of the Roman Empire Volume VI (1789), Edward Gibbon stated that 'both the name and the place are discovered by modern geographers at Lens'. Writing for the Magasin encyclopédique in 1797, Guilmot claimed to have discovered it as the village of Évin, on the road between Tournai and Arras. Alexandre-Joseph-Hidulphe Vincent published an essay in 1840, arguing that neither Lens nor Hesdin (two popular candidates in his time) was plausible, but that Allaines near the Mont Saint-Quentin and the town of Péronne was the lost Vicus Helena. Hubert le Bourdellès (1984) suggested Saint-Amand Abbey, which used to be known as Elnon(e). Tony Jaques (2007) went with Hélesmes in the year 431. De Boone (1954) connected Sidonius' reference to a frozen Loire river to the exceptionally harsh winter of 442–3 mentioned by the Annals of Marcellinus Comes, but Lanting & van der Plicht (2010) rejected this, as Marcellinus doesn't mention any harsh winter in Gaul, and focused mostly on the Eastern Roman Empire; instead, the latter two focused on the military career of Majorian (Sidonius called him a iuvenis or 'young man' in 458, while he had left active military service before 454, suggesting a birth around 420), concluding 445–450 to be the most likely period for the battle. Dierkens & Périn (2003) noted that Majorian had defeated the Bagaudae and freed Tours just before the battle of Vicus Helena; they dated the former two events (and therefore Vicus Helena as well) to 448, and endorsed the Hélesmes hypothesis. Alexander O'Hara (2018) suggested 'in around 448' at 'an unidentified site in the Artois', positing that it may be connected to the destruction of Arras around that time as well, although it is unknown whether Arras was sacked by Huns or Franks.

== Primary sources ==
- Sidonius Apollinaris, Panegyric to Majorian. Carmen V, 210–218. (458).
- Gregory of Tours, History of the Franks II, Chapter 9.
