= Battle of Fano =

Battle during the Roman-Germanic wars (271)

Coordinates: 43.833333°N 13.016667°E

- Part of the Crisis of the Third Century; Juthungian invasions of Italy and Roman–Germanic Wars
- Battle of Fano (Italy)
Date	271
Location	Metaurus River, Fano, Italy
Result	Roman victory

Belligerents
Roman Empire	Juthungi

Commanders and leaders
Emperor Aurelian	Unknown

The Battle of Fano also known as the Battle of Fanum Fortunae was fought in 271 between the Roman and the Juthungian armies. The Romans led by Emperor Aurelian, were victorious.

== Background ==
Aurelian had been defeated by the Juthungi at the Battle of Placentia in 271, but he had rallied his men, and started pursuing the Juthungi, who were quickly moving towards a defenceless Rome.

== Battle ==
Finally, the Roman Army caught and forced a fight with the Juthungi on the Metaurus River, just inland of Fano. The crucial moment of the battle was when the Juthungi were pinned against the river, so that, when the Germanic line was forced to give way, many of the Juthungi fell into the river and drowned according to the Romans.

== Aftermath ==
In spite of this and a following defeat in the Battle of Pavia, they remained in existence as an independent tribe until at least the beginning of the 5th century. They besieged and ultimately tore down the very important Roman military camp Castra Regina in 356 or 358AD together with the Alamanni. This is some 80 years after the event of the losses to Aurelian. This camp was one of the biggest in all of Roman-ruled Germania and borderland Gallia. The camp laid at what more or less corresponds to modern day Regensburg in Germany. The Juthungi and Alamanni who had fought alongside them probably settled in the area and became a part of the later Germanic nation of Bavaria.
