= Siege of Senonae =

356 siege, part of Roman-Alamanni conflict

Coordinates: 48.2°N 3.283333°E

- Part of the Roman–Alamanni conflict and Roman–Germanic Wars
Date	356
Location	Senonae, (modern France)
Result	Roman victory

Belligerents
Western Roman Empire	Alamanni

Commanders and leaders
Julian	Unknown

Strength
Unknown	Unknown

Casualties and losses
Unknown	Unknown

The siege of Senonae was a siege during Roman–Alamanni conflict which resulted in a Roman victory.

In 356, after leaving Cologne, Julian the Apostate, the future Roman emperor, wintered in Senonae (possibly modern Sens) in Gaul. Following desertions from his German federated troops, hostile Germanic warbands learned that his force was under-strength and moved to attack the town. However, lacking advanced siegecraft, they were not able to break into the town and could only prevent Julian from venturing outside the walls. After a month, they withdrew.

Finally, after a month the savages withdrew crestfallen, muttering that they had been silly and foolish to have contemplated the blockade of the city. But — a thing to be regarded as a shameful situation — while Caesar was in jeopardy, Marcellus, master of the horse, although he was stationed in neighbouring posts, postponed sending him reinforcements; whereas even if the city alone was endangered, to say nothing of the prince's presence there, it ought to have been saved from the hardships of blockade by the intervention of a large force.
