= Battle of Placentia (271) =

Battle during the Roman-Germanic wars (271)

Coordinates: 45.05°N 9.7°E

- Part of the Crisis of the Third Century; Juthungian invasions of Italy and Roman–Germanic Wars
- Battle of Placentia (271) (Italy)
Date	271
Location	near Piacenza, Italy
Result	Juthungian victory

Belligerents
Roman Empire	Juthungi

Commanders and leaders
Emperor Aurelian	Unknown

Strength
Unknown	Unknown

Casualties and losses
Unknown	Unknown

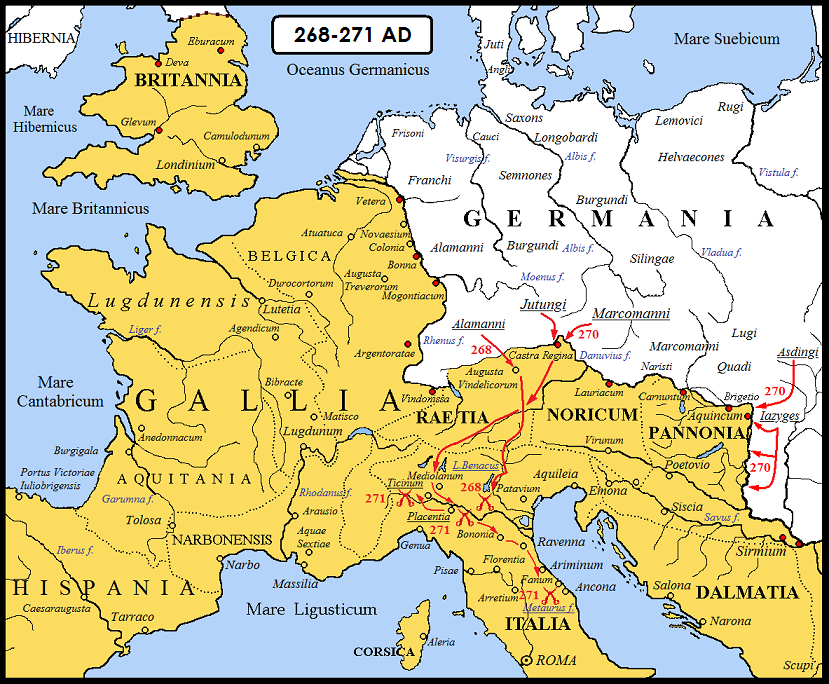

The Battle of Placentia was fought in 271 between a Roman army led by Emperor Aurelian and the Juthungi tribe, near modern Piacenza. The result was Juthungian victory.

== Background ==
Since the winter of 270, the Roman army had been occupied with repulsing a Vandal invasion at the Danube frontier. The expedition was ultimately successful, however, the Juthungi tribe seized the opportunity by invading Italia, counting on the absence of the Roman army.

Emperor Aurelian, who was in Pannonia with an army to control the withdrawal of the Vandals, hastily moved into Italia but, as he approached Mediolanum, he received news that the enemy was already moving south-east, after sacking Placentia. According to the Anonymous Continuator of Cassius Dio, he immediately sent them a message demanding their surrender, which they rejected by saying that if he wanted to challenge them they would show him how a free people could fight.

== Battle ==
The Juthungi surprised the exhausted Roman army in an ambush at a wooded area near Placentia, and the Roman army was defeated by the barbarians.

== Aftermath ==
The news of this humiliating defeat produced two short-lived military revolts. The Juthungi continued to move on Via Emilia towards Rome. Since no remarkable military force was left between the invaders and the capital, panic spread through the city, which had grown far beyond its old walls.

According to Historia Augusta, the Sibylline Books were consulted, and religious ceremonies were performed to call for the gods' help. The Romans escaped disaster when Emperor Aurelian soundly defeated the Juthungi at the Battle of Fano, leading to great celebration throughout the city.
