= Defeat in detail =

Military tactic

Defeat in detail, or divide and conquer, is a military tactic of bringing a large portion of one's own force to bear on small enemy units in sequence, rather than engaging the bulk of the enemy force all at once. This exposes one's own units to many small risks but allows for the eventual destruction of an entire enemy force.

== Etymology ==
The phrase likely arises from the French battre en détail. It had entered common usage in French society by at least 1756, and was quoted by Voltaire in 1758, and used in correspondence by the likes of Napoleon and Clausewitz by 1796 in the direct context.

== Use ==
In military strategy and tactics, a recurring theme is that units are strengthened by proximity to supporting units. Nearby units can fire on an attacker's flank, lend indirect fire support such as artillery, or maneuver to counterattack. Defeat in detail is the tactic of exploiting failures of an enemy force to coordinate and support the various smaller units that make up the force. An overwhelming attack on one defending subunit minimizes casualties on the attacking side and can be repeated a number of times against the defending subunits until all are eliminated.

An attacker can successfully conduct the tactic of defeat in detail by exploiting the absolute weaknesses or comparative disadvantages in the deployment or structure of defending troops, as well as advantages such as maneuvering speed that the defender cannot match. In an asymmetric support structure, A can support B, but unit B cannot support unit A. For example, during World War I, when horse cavalry was still in use to some extent, aircraft could support cavalry, but cavalry had little or no ability to support aircraft.

Thus, if a unit is equally suited for use against cavalry and aircraft, using it to eliminate enemy aircraft would have benefits that would last well into future engagements against enemy cavalry units weakened by their lack of support. However, using it against enemy cavalry, while leaving the enemy aircraft intact for subsequent engagements, would bring benefits only during that specific engagement.

=== Weaknesses of defenders ===
- Dug-in units that are spread out over so wide a distance that the maximum effective range of their weapons is significantly shorter than the distance between units, which prevents those units from supporting the flanks of neighboring units.
- Defending units on opposite sides of physical barriers such as hills, forests or rivers (but see the "reverse slope defence" for a historically attested deliberate tactic, now rendered obsolete by crewed and uncrewed aircraft).
- Defending units whose artillery support is too far to the rear and so cannot effectively engage attackers.
- Defending units that have no effective communications with their command structure and so cannot request assistance.

=== Enabling methods ===
The following methods can enable the attacker to defeat the enemy in detail:

- Attacking one unit faster than other defending units can move to counter-attack.
- Attacking faster than the defending intelligence, communications, command or control systems can respond (exploiting the OODA loop).
- Disabling or disrupting systems required for one defending unit to support another (as by attacking communications, command, or control systems with air strikes, artillery attacks, or radio jamming).

== Examples ==
=== Strategic campaigns ===
- 1796: Napoleon's Montenotte campaign, in which his army of 37,600 men defeated 67,000 Sardinian and Austrian troops by rapid advances, which prevented the two nations' armies from combining.
- 10–15 February 1814: the Six Days' Campaign was a final series of victories by the forces of Napoleon, as the Sixth Coalition armies closed in on Paris.
- 1862: Stonewall Jackson's Shenandoah Valley campaign, in which Jackson defeated three Union commands (a total of 60,000 men) with his own command (of 17,000 men), by fighting each of the enemy columns in turn while the Union commands were separated from each other by impassable terrain or a significant distance.
- 1912–1913: The Balkan League's victory over the Ottoman Empire in the First Balkan War.
- 1914: The Battle of Tannenberg and the First Battle of the Masurian Lakes, with the Germans exploiting the geography of the Masurian Lakes and the personal antipathy between the Russian commanders to defeat the Russian Second Army and later the Russian First Army.
- 1941: Operation Compass, when the British defeated an Italian force more than four times larger in North Africa by exploiting the fact that the Italian defenses could not support each other.

=== Tactical examples ===
- The Battle of Gaugamela, in which Alexander the Great used his Companion Cavalry to charge Darius III
- Gallic tribes tried and nearly succeeded in defeating Julius Caesar's army in detail at the Battle of the Sabis.
- In the Battle of the Teutoburg Forest, an army of Germans under Arminius exterminated Legio XVII, Legio XVIII and Legio XIX, Roman legions under Publius Quinctilius Varus.
- The Battle of Sluys, a naval battle fought on 24 June 1340 between England and France.
- The Battle of Pavia (1525), during the Italian War of 1521-1526
- The Battle of Pratapgarh in which Shivaji defeated the army of Afzal Khan
- The Battle of Rymnik (1789), in which Suvorov defeated the Ottomans
- The Battle of the Little Bighorn (1876), in which George Armstrong Custer essentially orchestrated his own defeat by dividing his regiment in four portions, allowing the Sioux and Cheyenne to annihilate half of the 7th Cavalry
- The Battle of Raate Road, in Finland (1940)
- The Battle of Savo Island, a naval battle fought on 8-9 August 1942 in which Vice Admiral Gunichi Mikawa of the Imperial Japanese Navy was able to defeat Allied naval forces in detail, with only light damage to his own.

== See also ==
- Horatii
- Big Wing
- Strategy of the central position
- Battle of annihilation
- Swarming (military)
- Lanchester's laws
- Battle of Cold Harbor
