= Roman military tombstones =

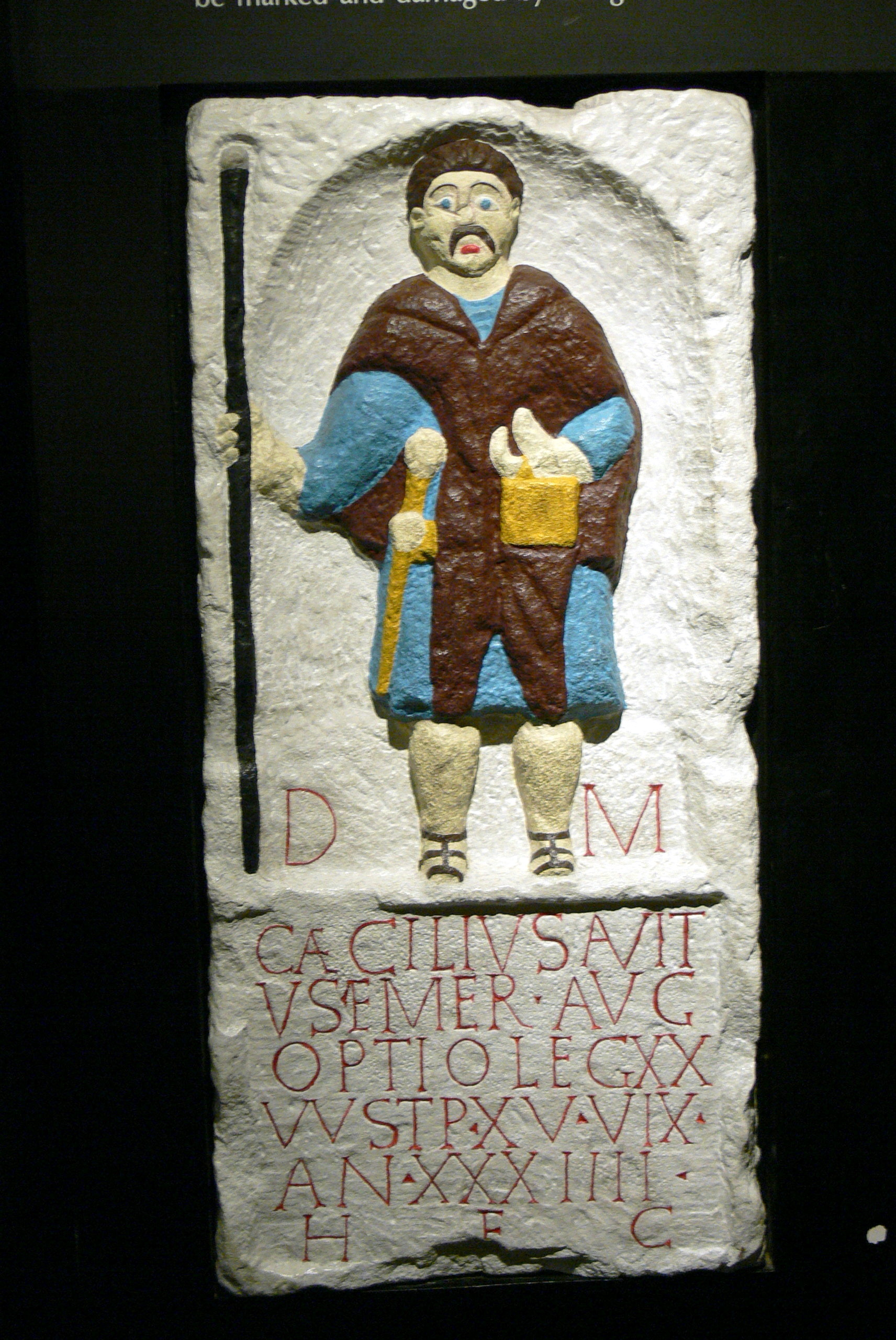
A copy of a Roman tombstone found in Chester (Deva Victrix) depicting Caecilius Avitus, an optio in the Legio XX Valeria Victrix

The archaeology of death in the Roman period provides great detail into the lives and practices of the Imperial Roman army.

== Tombstone form ==
The most familiar form of commemoration in death is the standing stone stelae; stone slabs taller than they are wide upon which they are inscribed with simple commemorative epitaphs. This may simply include a bordered written inscription, or one with added iconography of the deceased.

Military tombstones are most commonly from the 1st and 2nd centuries AD; the pre-Marian army used soldiers for specific campaigning periods; such soldiers would return to civilian life after serving in Rome's conflicts. The longer terms of military service instituted in the late 1st century BC provide more numerous examples.

== Epigraphic style ==
The Latin inscriptions on such tombstones can provide details on several aspects of life in the Roman army including:

Age - Through the Latin 'ANNORUM', an age at death is often provided like in modern headstones. Of a sample of 531 tombstones from the Roman period it was found that a trend exists whereby the age at death is rounded to the nearest five or ten, but this is not a uniform pattern.

Enlistment- Vegetius argues that enlistment occurs upon entering puberty, but Scheidel's sample discovered that around 50% of the tombstones showed enlistment occurring between ages 17 and 20, with an increase to 80% if ages 17 to 24 are included. There are also five examples of enlistment between ages 33 to 36 and one example at age 13.

Rank - Rank is an important factor in the Roman Army and one that is clearly visible in death. Examples exist showing the rank and file of the legions and auxiliary units, but also of centurions, standard-bearers, bene ficarii – units attached to the legatus's bodyguard and armourers,

One of the most famous tombstones from the Roman world is one of a centurion named Marcus Caelius. The inscription reads thus:

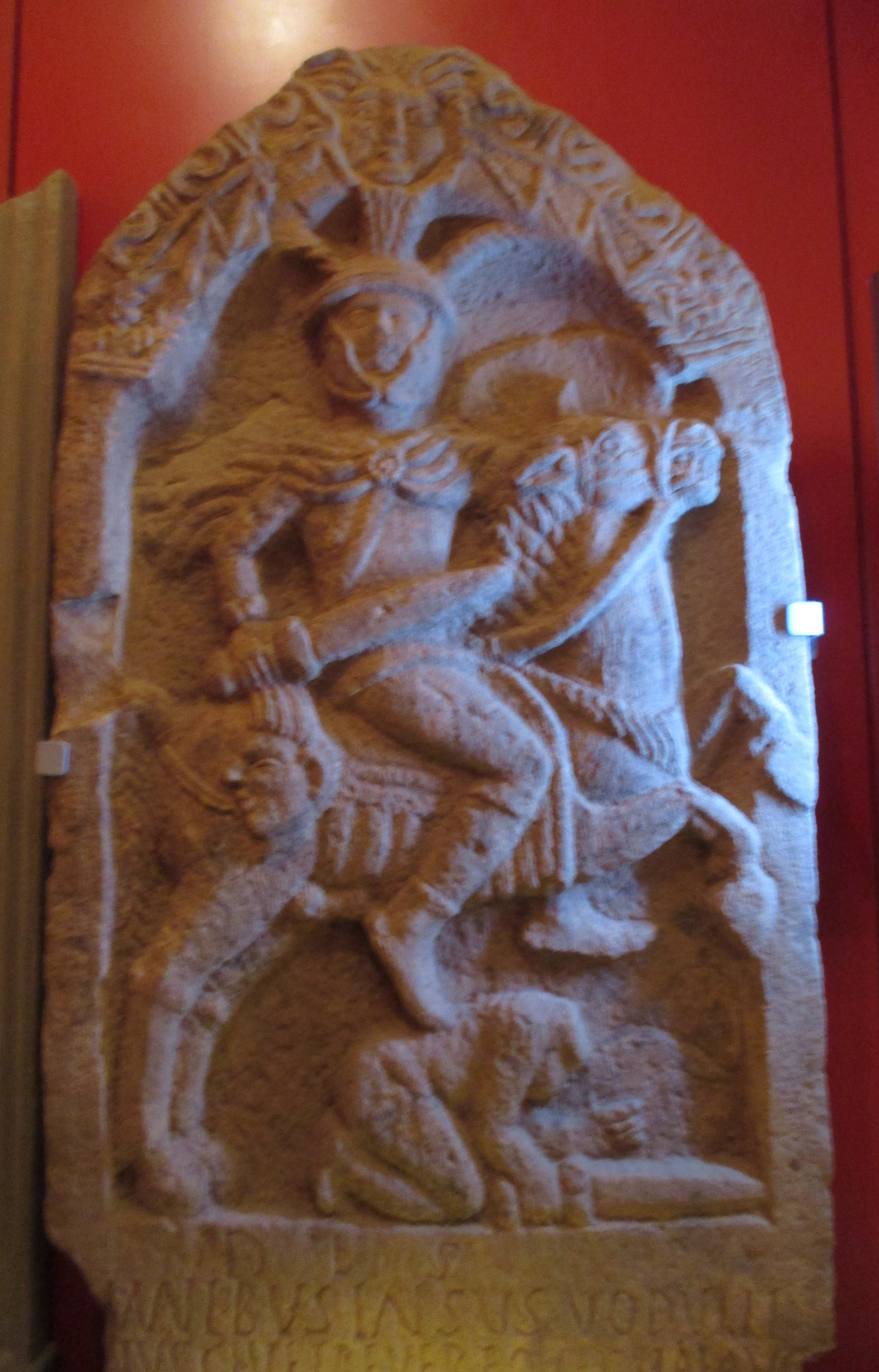
Tombstone of cavalryman Insus, now at Lancaster City Museum

M[arco] CAELIO T[iti] F[ilio] LEM[onia tribv] BON[onia] I O[rdinis] LEG[ionis] XIIX ANN[orvm] LIIIS OCCIDIT BELLO VARIANO OSSA INFERRE LICEBIT P[vblivs] CAELIVS T[iti] F[ilivs] LEM[onia tribv] FRATER FECIT

To Marcus Caelius, son of Titus, of the Lemonian district, from

Bologna, first centurion of the eighteenth legion. 53½ years old. He fell in the Varian War. His bones may be interred here. Publius Caelius, son of Titus, of the Lemonian district, his brother, erected (this monument).

== Iconographic style ==
The visual representation above the Latin inscription is important indeed as it provides an image of how the deceased has been immortalised in death. Several tombstones of auxiliary cavalrymen depict them in a killing-scene, riding high over a defeated (usually Gallic styled) foe. A 2007 discovery at Lancaster, Lancashire, UK depicts a cavalryman named Insus stationed in Britain. Instead of a relief showing him mid-kill, Insus rides tall over a prone enemy whilst holding the severed head of his victim in a victorious pose.

The tombstone of Marcus Caelius, at Xanten, in Germany, is a particularly well-known and ornate example of a legionary tombstone. He is shown in a deep-set relief, flanked by busts of his freedmen, beneath a classical colonnade and pediment. He holds the vitis, the cane held by a centurion, and wears a crown of oak – a symbol that he had saved another's life at some point.

== Purpose ==
Clearly the use of tombstones is held in the same regards as it is today – the living fulfilling an obligation of respect to the deceased. Hope argues that these funerary monuments do not necessarily reflect the realities of military society but the rhetoric of language and image through which society was constructed. The lack of tombstone evidence in Britain, when compared to Germany for example, reveals that other methods of commemoration must have been used; such as perishable wooden tombstones that would not survive, or un-marked grave sites.

== See also ==
- Epigraphy
- Headstone
- Epitaph
- List of wars involving Rome
- List of Roman wars and battles
- Roman funerary practices
