= Strategy of the central position =

The strategy of the central position (French: stratégie de la position centrale) was a key tactical doctrine followed by Napoleon in the Napoleonic Wars. It involved attacking two cooperating armies at their hinge, swinging around to fight one until it fled, then turning to face the other. The strategy allowed the use of a smaller force to defeat a larger one. However, these tactics, while successful at the battles of Ligny and Quatre Bras, failed at the Battle of Waterloo, and Napoleon was defeated because he was not able to prevent the joining of the British and Dutch forces by the Prussian forces.

At the battle of Blenheim (1704), the Duke of Marlborough and his ally Prince Eugene of Savoy realising the French were weak in the centre initially concentrated their attacks on the wings. When Marshal Tallard, the French Commander, further weakened his central position to reinforce the fortified villages on the wings of his position, Marlborough launched a battle winning attack through the centre.

Central position also describes the overall strategic situation of Frederick the Great during the War of the Austrian Succession and the Seven Years' War in the Eighteenth Century where, although Prussia was surrounded by enemies, Frederick was able to use his central position to maneuver and attack each enemy separately despite being vastly outnumbered overall.

In World War II, Rommel maintained a central position on the Mareth Line between allied forces in Tunisia and Libya.

The tactic loses at least some of its advantage when employed against successive wings or flanks of a single force with a unified command structure, as a single defending force's better communication and coordination enable it to better execute a pincer movement against the attacker.

== See also ==
- Defeat in detail
- Interior lines
