= Interior lines =

Method of movement and operation in warfare

Interior lines (Note: a term invented by 19th century Swiss-French officer and prominent author Antoine-Henri Jomini) (as opposed to exterior lines) is a military term, derived from the generic term line of operation or line of movement. The term "interior lines" is commonly used to illustrate, describe, and analyze the various possible routes (lines) of logistics, supply, reconnaissance, approach, attack, evasion, maneuver, or retreat of armed forces. Interior line strategies are based on the fact that lines of movement and communication within an enclosed area are shorter and safer than those on the outside. As the area held by a defensive force shrinks, the interior line advantage held by the defensive force increases.

Skillful and comprehensive application of interior line tactics can, for a partially surrounded combat force, provide vital breathing space, greatly reduce time, effort, security, and secrecy of resupplies and redeployment, and decrease the number of casualties. These effects may have a great impact on morale and eventually prove decisive, as according to Napoleon Bonaparte: "in war morale forces are to physical three to one".

== Tactic ==
By September 1950, US and South Korean Forces had been forced back to form the Pusan Perimeter in the South-East of the peninsula, giving the defenders shorter interior lines. This created a concentration of forces in defense, allowing quicker reinforcements and logistics. Fresh troops and supplies were increasingly being brought into the port in Pusan, strengthening the defense even further and preventing a North Korean victory. By contrast, the North Korean supply line had lengthened, making offensive action harder to maintain.

In the context of battlefield tactics, interior lines allow for more rapid concentration of resources (firepower and manpower) and afford greater tactical flexibility. Resources are ideally brought to bear at a point where the adversary is not able to quickly respond, because of their longer external lines. Examples include:

- At the Battle of Dyrrhachium (48 BC), the numerically superior Optimates, led by Gnaeus Pompeius Magnus, defeated the more battle-hardened Populares, led by Gaius Julius Caesar, when Caesar attempted to encircle them.
- During the Battles of Lexington and Concord, Brigadier General Hugh Percy utilized interior lines during the British retreat, as his men were often surrounded by militia.
- At the Battle of Jena-Auerstedt, Louis Nicolas Davout employed interior lines to defeat the main Prussian army.
- At the Battle of Wagram, the French under Napoleon I defeated the Austrians by using interior lines to achieve local numerical superiority.
- George Gordon Meade used interior lines against Robert E. Lee at the Battle of Gettysburg in 1863.
- During the Siege of Bastogne, US armored units in the city were able to quickly move to perimeter areas where the Germans were attacking, preventing any breakthroughs.

== Strategy ==
As a strategy, interior lines are commonly employed to cut armies off from reinforcements and supplies, or prevent allies from uniting their forces. Interior lines often allow for a numerically inferior force to gain a numerical superiority over an adversary in a given locality, which increases the chances of overpowering an enemy and defeating it in detail. In overpowering an enemy locally, an army hopes to demoralize the enemy sufficiently to bring it to political terms.

Some examples include:

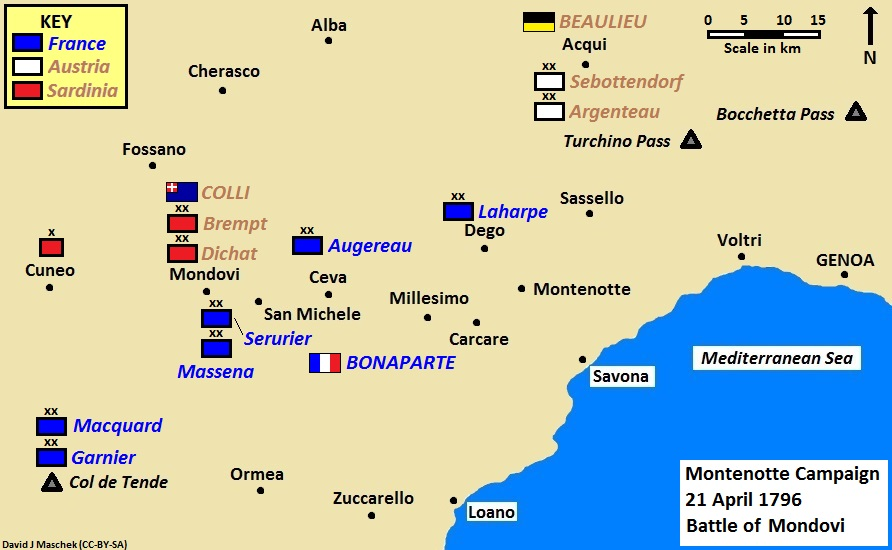
After the Battle of Mondovi, the French gained the advantage of having the interior position over their adversaries in the First Coalition.

- At the Battle of Montenotte, the French First Republic under Napoleon defeated the Austrians and destroyed an entire corps, thereby destroying the link between the Austrians and their allies, the Kingdom of Sardinia. As a result of the victory, the Sardinians were separated from Austria and were unable to defeat the French or rejoin the Austrians. They eventually sued for peace.
- Frederick the Great's operational strategy, in his prosecution of the Seven Years' War against the separate armies of the French, the Russians and the Austrians, can be considered an example of the advantage of interior lines in warfare.
- Interior lines also gave the Reds a distinct advantage over the Whites in the Russian Civil War.
- General Robert E. Lee used interior lines during the Battle of Antietam during the American Civil War in 1862.
- Though the Pusan Perimeter (Korea, 1950) was not an intentional strategy, the concentration of UN forces within the Perimeter allowed quick movement of supplies and reinforcements via interior lines.

== See also ==
- Military strategy
- Two-front war
- Encirclement

== Notes ==
Footnotes
