= Cherusci =

Germanic tribe in present-day northern Germany in the 1st centuries BCE and CE

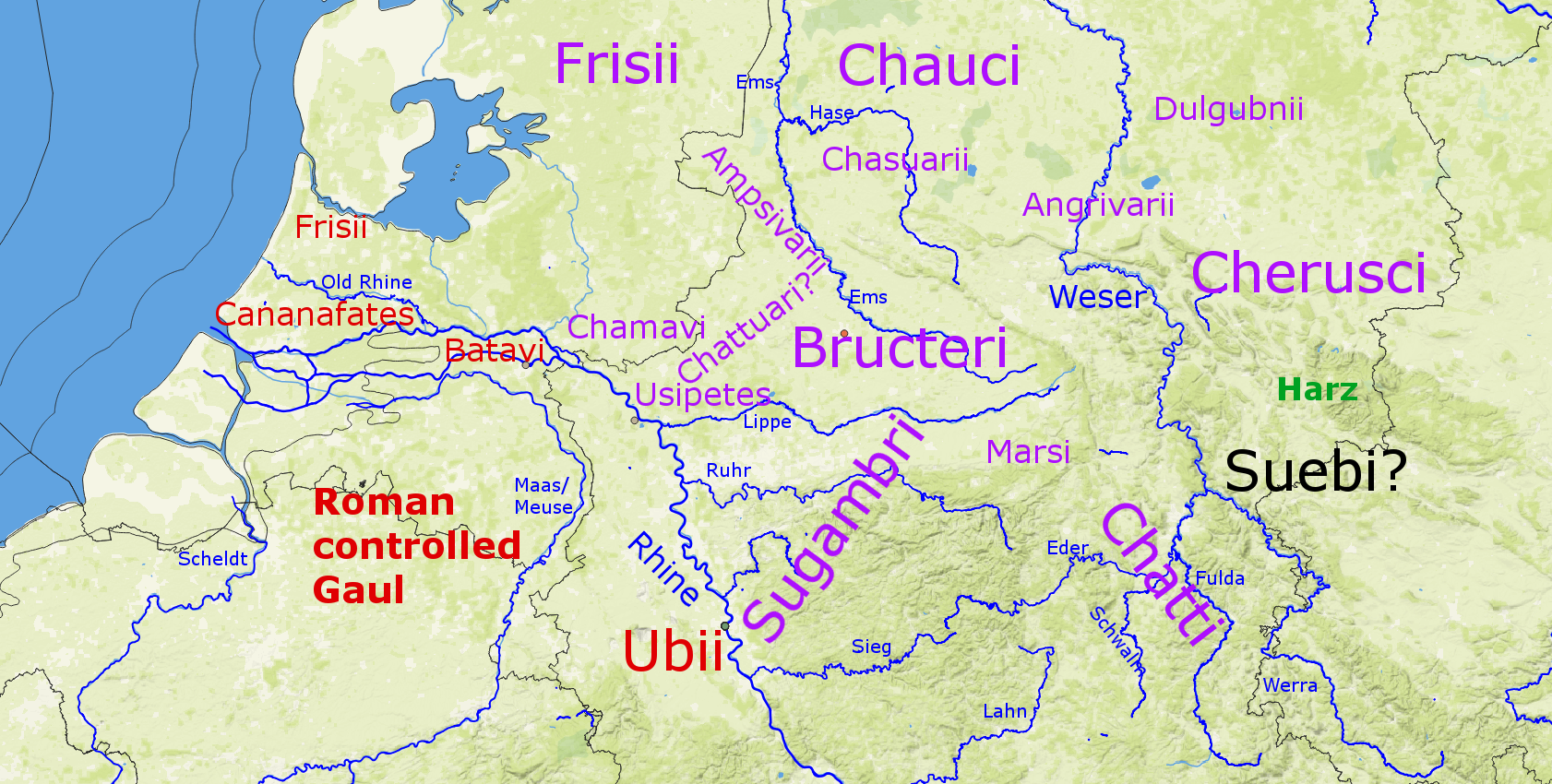
The approximate locations of several Germanic peoples in about 10 BC

The Cherusci were a Germanic people who lived in what is now northern Germany during the first centuries BC and AD. Roman authors described them living in an area around the middle of the Weser River, to their west were peoples living near the Ems and Lippe rivers such as the Bructeri, Sicambri and Marsi, and in the west their territory stretched towards the Elbe and the Suebian peoples who lived there, including the Langobardi and Semnones. To their north, also on the Weser, were the Angrivarii, and to the southwest of the Cherusci were the Chatti.

The Cherusci played a leading role in the Germanic revolt against the Roman empire which began in 9 AD, when a coalition led by the Cheruscan noble Arminius ambushed and destroyed three Roman legions led by Publius Quinctilius Varus, in an attack conventionally known as the Battle of the Teutoburg Forest. The revolt involved several neighbouring tribes, but Maroboduus, king of the Marcomanni, and the peoples within his sphere of power did not join the revolt. The Roman prince and military leader Germanicus led reprisal campaigns from 14 AD to 16 AD with mixed success, but he did not succeed to destroy the coalitions of Arminius or Maroboduus, or restore lasting Roman control. After this the Roman empire gave up its ambitions of largescale conquest and the creation of Roman provincial government in the region between the Rhine and Elbe. Instead however the empire continued to influence and intervene in the region.

Before the revolt the Cherusci were allies of Rome. Some, including Arminius and his brother Flavus, served in the Roman army, and received Roman citizenship. Several Cheruscan nobles remained loyal to Rome or opposed Arminius at different times, and in various ways. They included his brother Flavus, who continued to serve in the Roman army, and his father-in-law Segestes, who warned Varus of the conspiracy. In 17 AD, after the withdrawal of Germanicus, another Cherusci faction led by the uncle of Arminius, Inguiomerus, defected to Maroboduus, king of the Marcomanni.

Arminius was killed by relatives in AD 21 after being accused of seeking kingship. In 47 AD the Romans sent Italicus, the son of Flavus and the last known member of the Cheruscan royal family, to rule the tribe as king. After their defeat by the Chatti in the late first century AD, the Cherusci disappear from accounts of contemporary Germanic politics. Writing in around 100 AD Tacitus claimed that a policy of peace had been a disaster for the Cherusci.

In modern history the Cherusci and their rebellion became a source of inspiration for the idea of a freedom-loving German race and civilization, which influenced the development of the German national identity.

== Name ==
The English spelling Cherusci is derived from the Latin name for the tribe which is generally presumed to represent an otherwise unattested ethnonym with a Germanic etymology. Several Greek forms are also attested, including Khérouskoi and Khairouskoí (Χέϱουσϰοι, Χαιϱουσϰοί). This raises a question about the first vowel sound, and whether it was long or short. Philologist Günter Neumann argued that the first vowel was certainly short, and the spelling given by Strabo, Khēroûskoi (Χηροῦσκοι) with a long first vowel, is incorrect. Norbert Wagner however argued that Strabo's version is correct, and that the vowel was long.

There is no consensus about what the name meant. Günter Neumann lists the following traditional proposals, all based on the assumption that the name must be Germanic:

- Jacob Grimm (died 1863) connected the name with Gothic hairus, Old English heoru, which both referred to kinds of sword.
- Otto Bremer in 1886 associated the name with Old High German hārusk, meaning "hairy". Neumann rejected this because hārusk presupposes a long vowel, whereas he considered the first vowel of Cherusci short.
- Rudolf Much in 1893 connected the name with Germanic *herut- meaning "stag", represented in modern languages by examples such as English hart, and German Hirsch.
- Friedrich Kluge (died 1926) compared the word to Old High German horsc, Old English horsk, and Old Norse horskr, "quick, clever", and, through an assumed ablaut variant, interpreted Cherusci as "the clever ones".

Hans Kuhn in contrast argued that the word was not originally Germanic, and that the suffix -sk- is uncommon in Germanic. He proposed that the name was a survival from the non-Germanic, non-Celtic language stratum that he associated with the so-called Nordwestblock.

More recently Norbert Wagner argued that the name was originally Celtic, and meant "dark-coloured", but in this scenario the first consonant has been changed from a k-sound to a fricative sound under the influence of Germanic.

== Descriptions in classical sources ==
The Cherusci are first attested in Julius Caesar's Commentaries on the Gallic War, concerning his invasion of northern Gaul in 58-52 BC. He mentioned that the powerful Suebi were protected from the Cherusci by the "Bacenis Forest" (silva bacenis), a large and difficult-to-penetrate forest, sometimes identified with the Harz. The word bacenis apparently derived from the Germanic word for beech trees.

Strabo, writing about 20 AD, listed the Cherusci first as one of the more settled and non-nomadic Germanic peoples, together with the Chatti, Gamabrivii and Chattuarii. A second part of this list was described as being peoples closer to the ocean: the Sugambri, Chaubi, Bructeri, Cimbri, Cauci, Caülci and Campsiani. He also connected them to a list of tribes who were plundered by Germanicus and then marched in procession in Rome in 17 AD. The others listed with them in that context were Caülci, Campsani, Bructeri, Usipi, Chatti, Chattuarii, Landi, and Tubattii.

Pliny the Elder writing in about 70 AD categorized the Cherusci as one of Germanic group called Irminones, who live inland. In the same group he included Suebi, Chatti, and Hermunduri, tribes who claimed descent from a common ancestor.

To their west, Dio Cassius described the Cherusci lands in 11 BC as stretching over the Weser river. It was possible to walk into it from the territory of the Sicambri which was south of the Lippe. Tacitus, writing much later in about 100 AD, described the Cherusci of his time living to the east of the point where the Chauci and Chatti had come to share a border. Also in this later period, the northwestern neighbours of the Cherusci, the Angrivarii, had recently expanded southwestwards into the lands of the Bructeri. Unlike the Cherusci, Tacitus listed the Angrivarii among the Germanic peoples who had now come to be surrounded by the Chauci and Chatti.

Claudius Ptolemy's 2nd century Geography places the Cherusci west of the Elbe, and north of "Melibokus" mountains which might refer to the Harz Mountains or Thuringian Forest.

To their east it seems that the Cherusci came near to the Elbe river. Vibius Sequester, using old sources which are now lost, referred to the Elbe dividing the Cherusci from the Suebi, but it is difficult to determine which period this information came from and which Suebic people is referred to.

== History ==
=== Campaigns of Drusus and Tiberius ===
A generation after they were first mentioned by Caesar, the Cherusci came into contact with the Roman empire in 11 BC. This occurred in the early phases of the Roman Germania Wars of 12 BC–16 AD, led by Caesar's political heir, the first Roman emperor Augustus (reigned 27 BC—14 AD), and eventually ended by the second emperor Tiberius. Drusus the elder, stepson of Augustus, who governed Roman Gaul from 13 BC initiated the first invasions against the Sicambri, Usipetes and Tencteri who lived near the Rhine, west of the Cherusci, and had made attacks across the river into Gaul.

In 11 BC, in his second campaign across the Rhine, according to Cassius Dio Drusus first subjugated the Usipetes, then bridged the Lippe, and then crossed the entire country of the Sicambri without problem while the Sicambri were engaged in a campaign against the neighbouring Chatti, who had not yet joined the Sicambrian alliance. Drusus and his forces entered the land of the Cherusci but stopped at the river Weser, and then decided to turn back, not only because of a shortage ofsupplies, and the approach of winter, but also because a swarm of bees in the camp was seen as an omen. Local Germanic enemies harassed the Romans on the march, and managed to trap them in confined terrain. In the so-called Battle of Arbalo they only failed to destroy the Romans because of over-confidence and lack of discipline when the Romans seemed defeated. It is not known for sure whether the Cherusci were involved in this battle, or where exactly the battle happened. Lanting and van der Plicht believe the attackers were probably Sicambri.

In 10—9 BC Drusus campaigned at least once across the Rhine. It seems that in 10 BC he first defeated the Usipetes, before overrunning the territory of the Tencteri and Chatti, who were apparently both part of the Sicambrian alliance now. Probably in 9 BC, in the continuation of this campaign, Drusus also defeated the Marcomanni, and a powerful alliance of the Sicambri, Cherusci and Suevi. The accounts of the primary sources are as follows:

- Florus: "Drusus was sent into the province and conquered the Usipetes first, and then overran the territory of the Tencturi and Catthi. He erected, by way of a trophy, a high mound adorned with the spoils and decorations of the Marcomanni. Next he attacked simultaneously those powerful tribes, the Cherusci, Suebi and Sicambri, who had begun hostilities after crucifying twenty of our centurions".
- Orosius: "Drusus, in Germany, first subdued the Usipetes, then the Tencteri and Chatti. He almost exterminated the Marcomanni. Later, he conquered the strongest nations, [...], such as the Cherusci, Suebi, and Sugambri, all in a single war (bellum), but also with great difficulty."
- Dio Cassius: "Drusus [...] invaded the country of the Chatti and advanced as far as that of the Suebi, conquering with difficulty the territory traversed and defeating the forces that attacked him only after considerable bloodshed. From there he proceeded to the country of the Cherusci...".

In 9 BC at the end of this campaign Drusus died.

In 8 BC Augustus and future emperor Tiberius, the brother of Drusus, came north. According to Dio Cassius, Tiberius crossed the Rhine and all the Germani except the Sicambri made overtures of peace. However Augustus refused to make a truce unless the Sicambri did, and when Sicambri envoys arrived they were captured, and they all died in capitvity. Other classical sources say that Tiberius forced large numbers of Suebi and Sicambri to be moved west of the Rhine, within the Roman empire. The terms of the Cherusci submission are not known, but Roman writers thereafter treated the Cherusci as a dependent and ostensibly friendly people.

The Romans intervened in Cherusci factional politics, although details are unclear. Lucius Domitius Ahenobarbus led an army across the Elbe, penetrating further into Germany than any Roman before him, and gaining triumphal honours. Dio Cassius recorded that he did this while governing an area near the Danube, but later, when governing the Rhine, he made an effort to have Cheruscan exiles returned to their homeland. This caused some Germani to have contempt for the Romans. Velleius Paterculus also wrote of a "vast" or "extensive" war that broke out (immensum exarserat bellum) during the governorship of Marcus Vinicius in about 1 AD, after which Vinicius also received triumphal honours.

In 4 AD Tiberius was back in the region and he crossed the Rhine to subdue, in sequence, the Chamavi, Chattuari, and Bructeri. Then the Cherusci were re-subjugated. The Weser, which lay in their territory, was crossed, and regions beyond it were also penetrated. He was the first Roman military leader to pitch a winter camp in the heart of Germania, near the source of the river Lippe, and therefore in or near the Cherusci territory.

In the following summer of 5 AD Tiberius re-subjugated the Chauci, and broke the power of the Langobards, both peoples living north of the Cherusci. He also marched his force to the Elbe, and had Roman ships sail up the river. In 6 AD Tiberius began preparing a major attack upon the Marcomanni kingdom of Maroboduus, which was the last outpost of independent power in Germania, but a major revolt started in Pannonia and the Marcomanni and their allies remained independent.

=== The revolt of Arminius in 9 AD ===
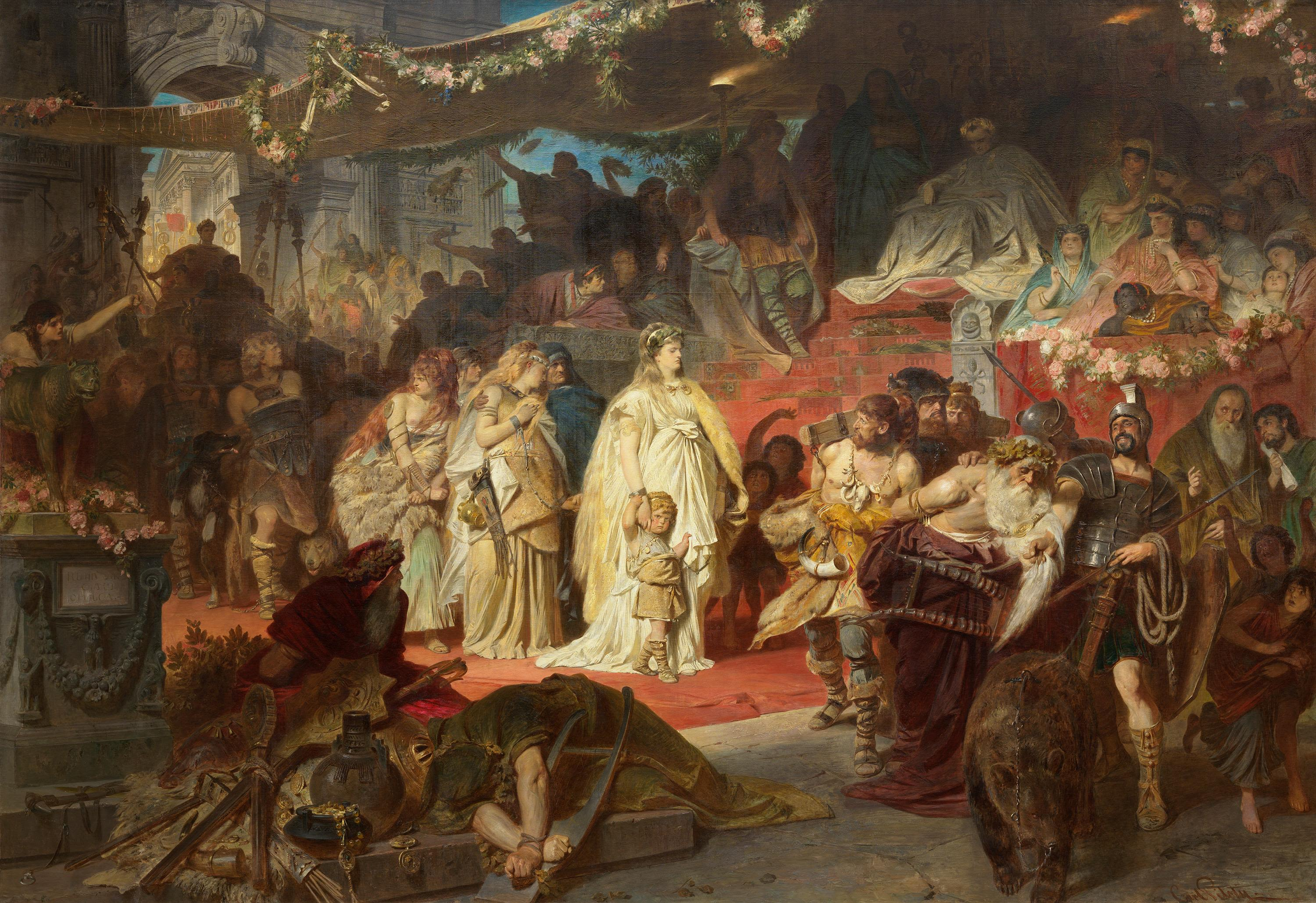
Thusnelda at the Triumph of Germanicus, by Karl von Piloty, 1873.

Starting in 6 or 7 AD, after Tiberius was forced to depart, the new province of Germania was governed for the Romans by Publius Quinctilius Varus, who tried to change the country more quickly into a normal Roman territory. According to Dio Cassius, Varus triggered resentment by giving commands to the Germani as if they were slaves, and demanding payments as if they were subject nations. Instead of rebelling the Germani were friendly towards him and drew him and his soldiers into various scattered activities deep in Germania.

Two leaders of the Cherusci, Segimer and his son Arminius, were deeply involved in this plot. They became constant companions of Varus, and often ate with him. Velleius Paterculus described Arminius as a young man of noble birth, brave in action and alert in mind, possessing an intelligence quite beyond the ordinary barbarian", a prince (princeps) of the Germani people (gens), who showed "the fire of the mind within in his countenance and in his eyes". He noted that Arminius had been a constant companion to the Romans in military service and had also obtained Roman citizenship and the distinction of equestrian rank. Tacitus wrote that during a battle Arminius called out to his own brother Flavus in Latin, which he had learned in the Roman army as a leader of his own countrymen. Modern scholars believe that Arminius and his Cheruscan unit had fought for Rome in the recent Pannonian conflict of 7-8 AD. It is possible but uncertain that they were still considered auxiliaries of the Roman military when they returned home, and it is also possible that Segimer died before the subsequent rebellion began.

The father-in-law of Arminius, a Cheruscan noble named Segestes, who had objected to the marriage of his daughter, attempted to warn the governor about the conspiracy repeatedly. However, Varus ignored Segestes and followed Arminius to a distant revolt in the north, travelling first towards the area of the Weser and the Cherusci territory with three legions, three cavalry alae, and six infantry cohorts. Arminius, Segimer, and Segestes travelled with Varus. Germanic forces were secretly set in place by the conspirators who included not only the Cherusci, but also the neighbouring Marsi, Bructeri and probably also Chatti. The conspirators attacked Roman outposts first and then the force of Varus, while it was travelling through dense forest.

After 3-4 days of fighting and the Romans moving and establishing at least two fortified camp positions, the Cherusci and their allies destroyed the 17th, 18th, and 19th Legions, who no longer appear in Roman records after this time. The Roman army had originally set out from a position near the sources of the Ems and Lippe, and not far from the Weser and Cherusci territory.

Arminius sent the head of Varus to Maroboduus after the battle. However, Maroboduus rejected the offer of an alliance and sent the head on to Rome.

=== Campaigns of Germanicus ===
In 13 AD Germanicus, the nephew of Tiberius, was sent to Germania by Augustus. In 14 AD, after the death of Augustus, he faced major problems with the discipline of the troops. Germanicus began a new series of invasions, attacking the Marsi at a holy site called Tamfana. The Bructeri, Tubantes, and Usipetes, attempted to ambush the Romans during their return from this slaughter, but the Roman forces managed to force their way back out of the forest passes.

In 15 AD, Germanicus had hopes that the Cherusci would be divided between Arminius and his more pro-Roman father-in-law Segestes. Already in the spring he had Aulus Caecina Severus lead an attack against the Chatti. When returning towards the Rhine they defeated Marsi forces, and frightened off Cherusci forces, who came to help the Chatti.

Soon afterwards, Segestes sent envoys including his son Segimundus to the Romans across the Rhine. He asked for help against his own people, the Cherusci. Germanicus led his army to break a siege. He rescued Segestes and some of his kinsfolk and dependents. He also took some women of rank, including the pregnant wife of Arminius, the daughter of Segestes, who came unwillingly. The Romans were also able to recover some of the plunder taken when Varus was defeated. Complaining of treachery, and Roman attacks against a pregnant woman, Arminius roused the support of neighbouring tribes and Cherusci including his own uncle Inguiomerus, who was respected by the Romans.

To distract the enemy, Germanicus sent Caecina with forty Roman cohorts through the Bructeri country to the river Ems. Lucius Stertinius moved ahead quickly to attack the Bructeri before they could burn their possessions, and managed to recover the eagle of the nineteenth legion which had been lost at the defeat of Varus. The troops ravaged their whole country between the Ems and Lippe. Secondly, cavalry was led through the territories of the Frisii, and thirdly Germanicus himself went with four legions on ships through the lakes which covered what is now the northern Netherlands. These three groups met at the Ems, at the limits of Bructeri territory. Germanicus then visited the sites of the Varus disaster, where human skeletons remained unburied amidst signs of human sacrifice, before turning towards the Cherusci country to the east. He sent Caecina to scout head in the forest-passes, and swamps, to raise bridge and causeways. When Germanicus started to push towards the Cherusci plains they were ambushed by Arminius, who had soldiers waiting in forest passes, who began pushing the Romans into swamps. Germanicus retreated back to the Ems, but Caecina was instructed to use the narrow causeways which went through large swamps, which had formerly been constructed by Lucius Domitius. This led to the Battle at Pontes Longi. Retreating from the Cherusci he camped on a slope while some of his men fought, and others rebuilt the bridges. The Cherusci were more used to the slippery terrain, and they were helped by not wearing heavy mail, and by being tall and using long spears when fighting. After several days of desperate struggle many of the Romans managed to retreat, and Arminius and Inguiomerus, who was wounded, had to escape the final battle when they attempted to storm Roman trenches. Tacitus considered this retreat a victory, and the Senate decreed a triumph, although the war remained open, and Tiberius the emperor was clearly now opposed to continuing the Germanic wars.

In 16 AD, contrary to imperial instructions Germanicus prepared for a bigger campaign. He prepared a fleet of 1000 ships, the Upper German army raided the Chatti, and with 6 legions Germanicus relieved a Roman fort based on the Lippe from a siege, and repaired roads to that area.

The forces of Germanicus and Arminius first confronted each other across the Weser, and Arminius asked for an interview with his brother Flavus, who fought among the Roman forces. The Romans forded the river with difficulty on the next day, and learned that the Cherusci had already chosen a battle field. The first major Battle of 16 AD happened on Idistaviso, an irregularly-shaped plain between the meandering Weser in the west and hills and forest in the east. The Cherusci alone took up position on the heights, so that they could charge down from above once the Romans were engaged. The Roman force was far greater than the three legions lost by Varus, and had strained the resources of Gaul. It included eight legions, two praetorian cohorts, selected cavalry, Gallic and German auxiliaries, and various archers and other allied forces. The Roman cavalry managed to attack the rear of the Cherusci and Arminius and his uncle Inguiomer were both wounded and narrowly evaded capture. The Roman soldiers proclaimed Tiberius as imperator and raised a pile of arms as a trophy with the names of the defeated tribes inscribed beneath them.

This trophy enraged the Germani in the area, who had been preparing to flee, but now flew to arms. "Common people and chiefs, young and old, rushed on the Roman army, and spread disorder." A second battle site was chosen in a narrow swampy plain between a river and forests, with the forests surrounded by deep swamp and on one side an earthwork which marked the boundary of Cherusci and Angrivarii territory, the so-called Angrivarian Wall. This second battle ended in another decisive Roman victory, with Germanicus calling for no prisoners. On the trip home however the forces who travelled by ship down the Ems encountered a heavy hailstorm at sea. "Some of the vessels were swallowed up; many were wrecked on distant islands, and the soldiers, finding there no form of human life, perished of hunger, except some who supported existence on carcases of horses washed on the same shores."

According to Tacitus, Germanicus was recalled to Rome by emperor Tiberius in repeated letters, advising him to return for the triumph having had enough success, but also enough disaster. "The Cherusci and the other insurgent tribes, since the vengeance of Rome had been satisfied, might be left to their internal feuds." On the 26th of May "Germanicus Caesar, celebrated his triumph over the Cherusci, Chatti, and Angrivarii, and the other tribes which extend as far as the Elbe". Germanicus was then moved to the Parthian border in Syria and soon died, possibly from poisoning.

=== Arminius after Germanicus ===
Soon after the departure of Germanicus, Arminius and Maroboduus turned upon each other. They were quite evenly matched according to Tacitus. Two major allies of Maroboduus, the Semnones and Langobardi, switched to the side of Arminius, while the faction of the uncle of Arminius, Inguiomerus, joined Maroboduus. After a destructive battle Maroboduus withdrew to his camp in the hills, and suffered from largescale desertions. He asked the Romans for help, but they refused.

As early as 19 AD, a Chattan noble made an offer to the Roman senate to assassinate Arminius. In 21 AD Arminius was killed by his own relatives for trying to raise himself above the aristocratic society of his people, and become a king. Tacitus says that he lived thirty-seven years, and in the time of Tacitus he was still a theme of song among barbarous nations, although he was unknown to Greek historians, and not as famous as he should be among the Romans.

=== After Germanicus ===
After Arminius's murder, the Romans left the Cherusci more or less to their own devices. In 47 AD, the Cherusci asked Rome to send Italicus, the son of Flavus and nephew of Arminius, to become their chieftain, as civil war had destroyed their other nobility. He was initially well liked but, since he was raised in Rome as a Roman citizen, he soon fell out of favor.

After a fierce struggle which he won, Italicus became proud, and was expelled but then reinstalled by the neighbouring Langobardi.

Surviving information about the Cherusci after this time is limited. Dio Cassius mentions a king of the Cherusci named Chariomerus who was driven out of his kingdom by the neighbouring Chatti during the reign of the emperor Domitian (reigned 81-96), because he was too friendly with the Romans. He gathered some companions and successfully returned. However his allies deserted him when he sent hostages to the Romans, and so became the suppliant of the emperor. He did not secure any military support from the Romans, only money.

Tacitus said that in his time, about 100 AD, the Cherusci had "long cherished, unassailed, an excessive and enervating love of peace". According to him this "was more pleasant than safe, for to be peaceful is self-deception among lawless and powerful neighbours". The Cherusci, "ever reputed good and just, are now called cowards and fools", while their neighbours the Chatti were now associated with success and prudence. Tacitus also noted the downfall of the Fosi, a neighbouring tribe who "shared equally in their disasters, though they had been inferior to them in prosperous days".

The later history of the Cherusci is unattested.

== See also ==
- Barbarians, a 2020 TV series dramatizing the events around the Battle of Teutoburg Forest

== Bibliography ==
- Beard, Mary (2007), The Roman Triumph, The Belknap Press of Harvard University Press, ISBN 978-0-674-02613-1
- Callies, Horst (1973), "Arminius § 1. Historisches", in Beck, Heinrich; Geuenich, Dieter; Steuer, Heiko (eds.), Reallexikon der Germanischen Altertumskunde, vol. 1 (2 ed.), De Gruyter, pp. 417–420, ISBN 978-3-11-004489-8
- Dahlheim, Werner (1973), "Arbalo", in Beck, Heinrich; Geuenich, Dieter; Steuer, Heiko (eds.), Reallexikon der Germanischen Altertumskunde, vol. 1 (2 ed.), De Gruyter, pp. 382–383, ISBN 978-3-11-004489-8
- Faoro, Davide (2014), "Gli ornamenta triumphalia di L. Domitius Ahenobarbus e Augusto, imperator XV", Zeitschrift für Papyrologie und Epigraphik, 190: 234–238, JSTOR 23850704
- Kehne, Peter (1998), "Germanicus", in Beck, Heinrich; Geuenich, Dieter; Steuer, Heiko (eds.), Reallexikon der Germanischen Altertumskunde, vol. 11 (2 ed.), De Gruyter, pp. 438–448
- Kuhn, Hans; Beck, Heinrich (1973), "Arminius § 2. Namenkundliches", in Beck, Heinrich; Geuenich, Dieter; Steuer, Heiko (eds.), Reallexikon der Germanischen Altertumskunde, vol. 1 (2 ed.), De Gruyter, pp. 420–421, ISBN 978-3-11-004489-8
- Lanting; van der Plicht (2010), "De ^{14}C-chronologie van de Nederlandse Pre- en Protohistorie VI: Romeinse tijd en Merovingische periode, deel A: historische bronnen en chronologische schema's", Palaeohistoria, vol. 51/52, p. 62, ISBN 978-90-77922-73-6
- Neumann, Günter (1981), "Cherusker §1. Namenkundliches", in Beck, Heinrich; Geuenich, Dieter; Steuer, Heiko (eds.), Reallexikon der Germanischen Altertumskunde, vol. 4 (2 ed.), De Gruyter, pp. 430–431, ISBN 978-3-11-006513-8
- von Petrikovits, Harald (1984), "Clades Variana", in Beck, Heinrich; Geuenich, Dieter; Steuer, Heiko (eds.), Reallexikon der Germanischen Altertumskunde, vol. 5 (2 ed.), De Gruyter, pp. 14–20, ISBN 978-3-11-009635-4
- Polak, Marinus; Kooistra, Laura (2013), "A sustainable frontier? The establishment of the Roman frontier in the Rhine delta. Part 1: From the end of the Iron Age to the death of Tiberius (c. 50 BC-AD 37)", Jahrbuch des Römisch-Germanischen Zentralmuseums, 60: 355–458
- Roberts, J. M. (1996). A History of Europe. New York: Allen Lane. ISBN 978-0-96584-319-5.
- Seager, Robin (2008), Tiberius, John Wiley & Sons, ISBN 9780470775417
- Tacitus, Cornelius (2008), Barrett, Anthony (ed.), The Annals: The Reigns of Tiberius, Claudius, and Nero, Oxford University Press, ISBN 9780192824219
- von Uslar, Rafael (1981), "Cherusker §5. Archäologisches", in Beck, Heinrich; Geuenich, Dieter; Steuer, Heiko (eds.), Reallexikon der Germanischen Altertumskunde, vol. 4 (2 ed.), De Gruyter, p. 435, ISBN 978-3-11-006513-8
- Wagner, Norbert (2015), "Lemovii, Helvecones*, Batavi, Βατίνοι, Chamavi, Cherusci Stammesnamen zwischen Germanen und Kelten", Historische Sprachforschung / Historical Linguistics, 128: 289–298, JSTOR 44114693
- Wells, Peter S. (2003). The Battle That Stopped Rome. Norton. ISBN 978-0-393-32643-7.
- van Wijlick, Hendrikus A. M. (2025), "Expansion, Territorial Loss, and Reach", in Günther, Sven (ed.), Roman Empire: A Handbook, De Gruyter Oldenbourg, pp. 61–90, doi:10.1515/9783110618211-006
- Wenskus, Reinhard (1981), "Cherusker §2-§4", in Beck, Heinrich; Geuenich, Dieter; Steuer, Heiko (eds.), Reallexikon der Germanischen Altertumskunde, vol. 4 (2 ed.), De Gruyter, pp. 431–435, ISBN 978-3-11-006513-8
