= Marcus Caelius =

Roman soldier (c. 45 BC – c. AD 9)

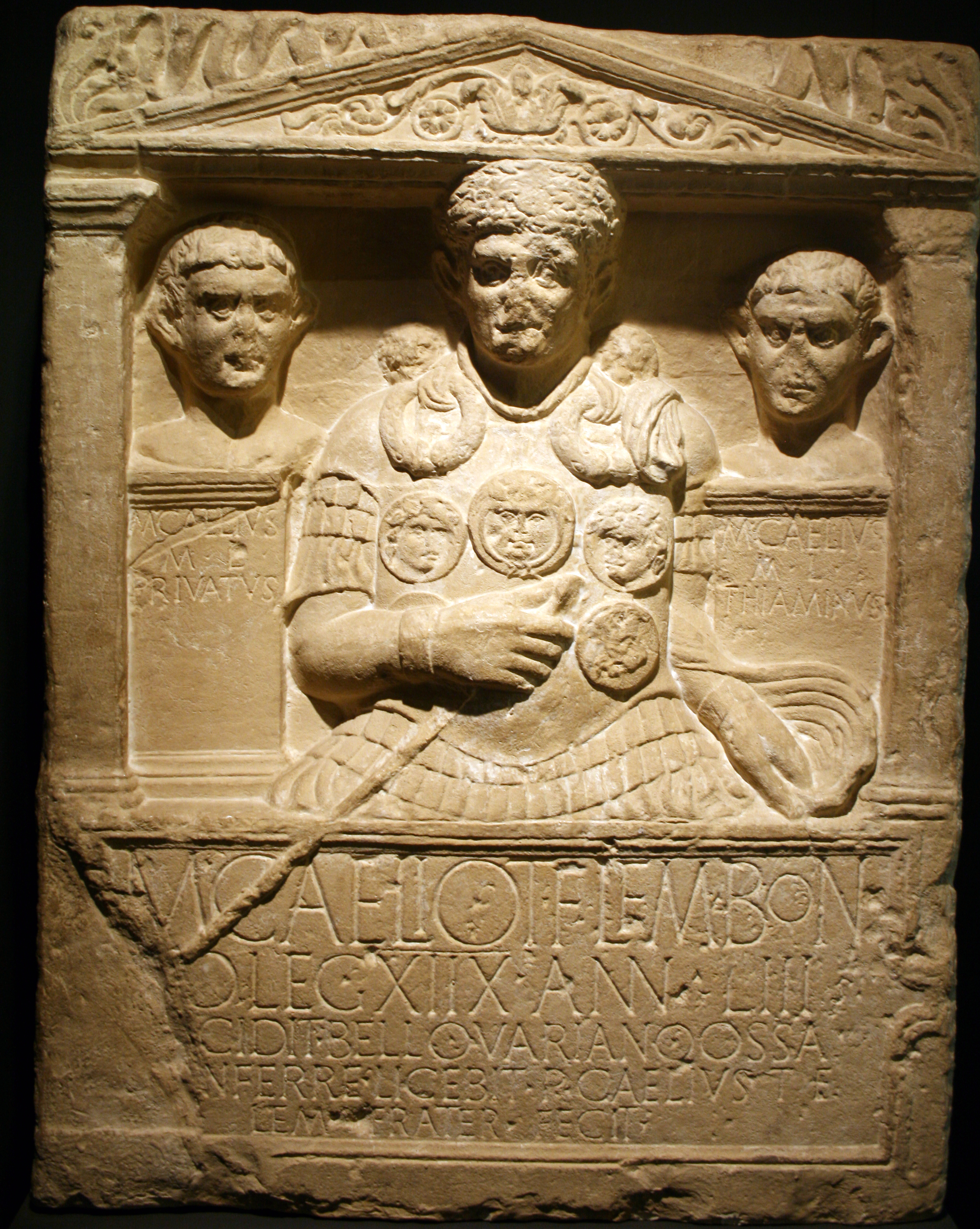
- Marcus Caelius (center) as portrayed in his cenotaph
- Born: c. March 45 BC; Bononia (Bologna, Italy)
- Died: c. September AD 9 (aged 53); Kalkriese, Germania
- Relatives: Titus Caelius (father); Publius Caelius (brother); M. C. Thiaminus (freedman); M. C. Privatus (freedman)
- Military career
- Allegiance: Roman Empire
- Branch: Roman Army
- Rank: Primus pilus
- Unit: XVIII Roman Legion
- Conflicts: Roman campaigns in Germania (12 BC – AD 16): Battle of the Teutoburg Forest †

Marcus Caelius (c. March 45 BC – c. September AD 9) was the senior centurion (Primus pilus) in XVIII Roman Legion who was killed in the Battle of the Teutoburg Forest. He is known from his cenotaph, which was discovered in 1620 in Birten (now a part of Xanten), Germany. Caelius is depicted wearing his military uniform, with phalerae (a type of military decoration), armillae (a type of bracelet), and a corona civica (an award for saving a fellow citizen's life), while in his right hand, he holds a vitis (carried by all centurions). On either side of his image are his non-combatant servants, Privatus and Thiaminus, both of whom perished in the battle and were given the status of freedman posthumously by Caelius’ brother, Publius.

The tombstone's lower left corner is damaged, but enough survives to determine that the text below the image once read:

M[ARCO] CAELIO T[ITI] F[ILIO] LEM[ONIA TRIBV] BON[ONIA]

P[RIMVS] O[RDO] LEG[IONIS] XIIX ANN[ORVM] LIII S[EMISSIS]

[CE]CIDIT BELLO VARIANO OSSA

[HVC] INFERRE LICEBIT P[UBLIVS] CAELIVS T[ITI] F[ILIVS]

LEM[ONIA TRIBV] FRATER FECIT

English translation:

To Marcus Caelius, son of Titus, of the Lemonian district, from Bologna,

first centurion of the eighteenth legion. 53 1/2 years old.

He fell in the Varian War.

His freedman's bones may be interred here. Publius Caelius, son of Titus,

of the Lemonian district, his brother, erected (this monument)."

The tombstone can today be found in the Rheinisches Landesmuseum in Bonn.
