= Battle of Arbalo =

Battle between Romans and Germanic tribes (11 BC)

- Part of the Roman campaigns in Germania (12 BC – AD 16), the Campaigns of Drusus and the Roman–Germanic Wars
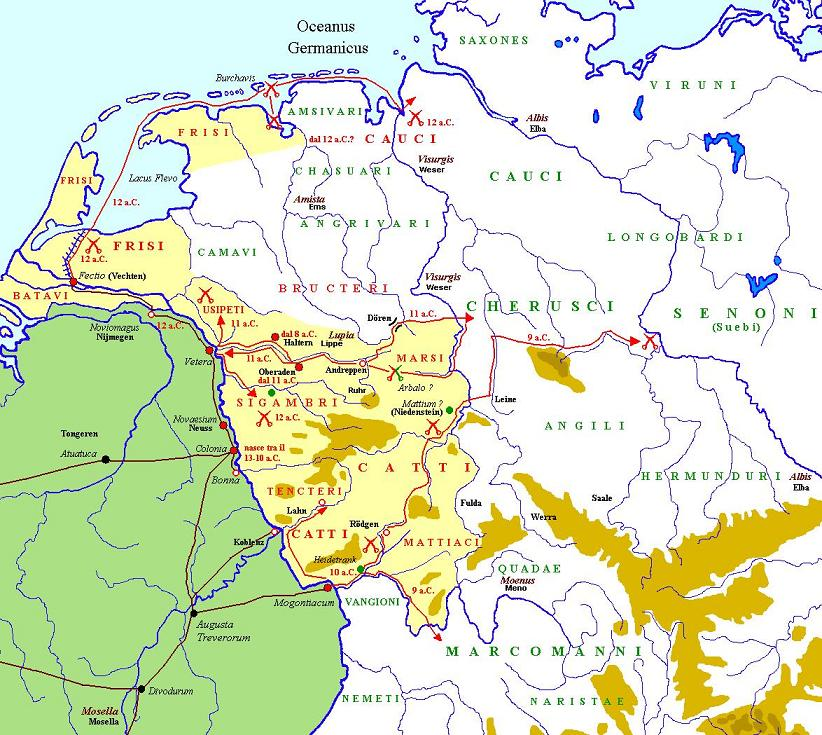
- Campaigns of Drusus
Date	11 BC
Location	Arbalo (not precisely identified)
Result	Roman victory

Belligerents
Roman Empire	Allied Germanic peoples, possibly including the: Cherusci; Sicambri

Commanders and leaders
Drusus	Unknown, possibly Segimer

Strength
19,200–41,600 (estimated)	10,000–20,000 (estimated)

Casualties and losses
1,000–3,000 (estimated)	2,000–5,000 (estimated)

The Battle of Arbalo was fought between the Romans and Germanic peoples in 11 BC in a narrow pass called Arbalo somewhere west of the Weser and probably near the Lippe.

It was part of Drusus' Germanic campaign (12–8 BC), which started in the unstable north of the Roman Empire near Gaul. With the Germans from the east of Gaul constantly attacking Rome, Augustus would send Drusus.

As part of operations by Augustus to secure the borders of the Roman Empire, Drusus, military commander and stepson of Augustus, was given the order to pacify the region on either side of the River Rhine. In spring 11 BC. he crossed the Rhine with his army and defeated the Usipetes. He built a bridge over the Lippe and marched through the territory of the Sugambri and the Cherusci to the Weser.

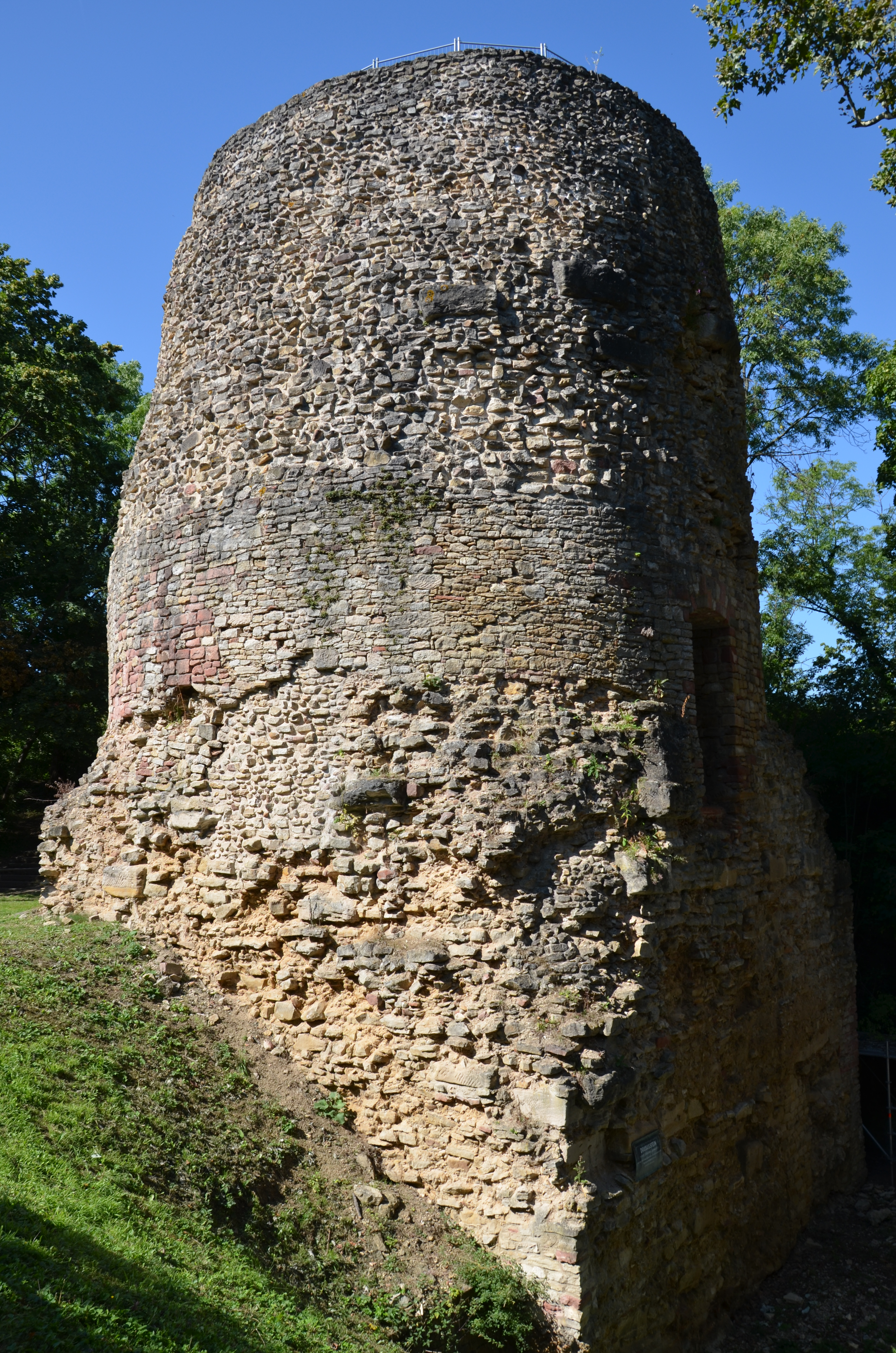
The buried place of Drusus by his soldiers

During its return march to the Rhine the army was lured into an ambush at a place called Arbalo. It was attacked in a narrow pass by the Cherusci.

Using the element of surprise and their advantageous position, the Germans were winning until they decided to retreat for some time, allowing the Romans to break through the force defending one of the exits and escape. After the battle, Drusus would build a fortified fort where the battle took place. However, only two years after the battle of Arbalo, Drusus would die after falling off a horse.

It has been proposed that Arbalo was near modern-day Hameln or Hildesheim. At the end of the campaign, the Romans were able to secure their lands to the north.

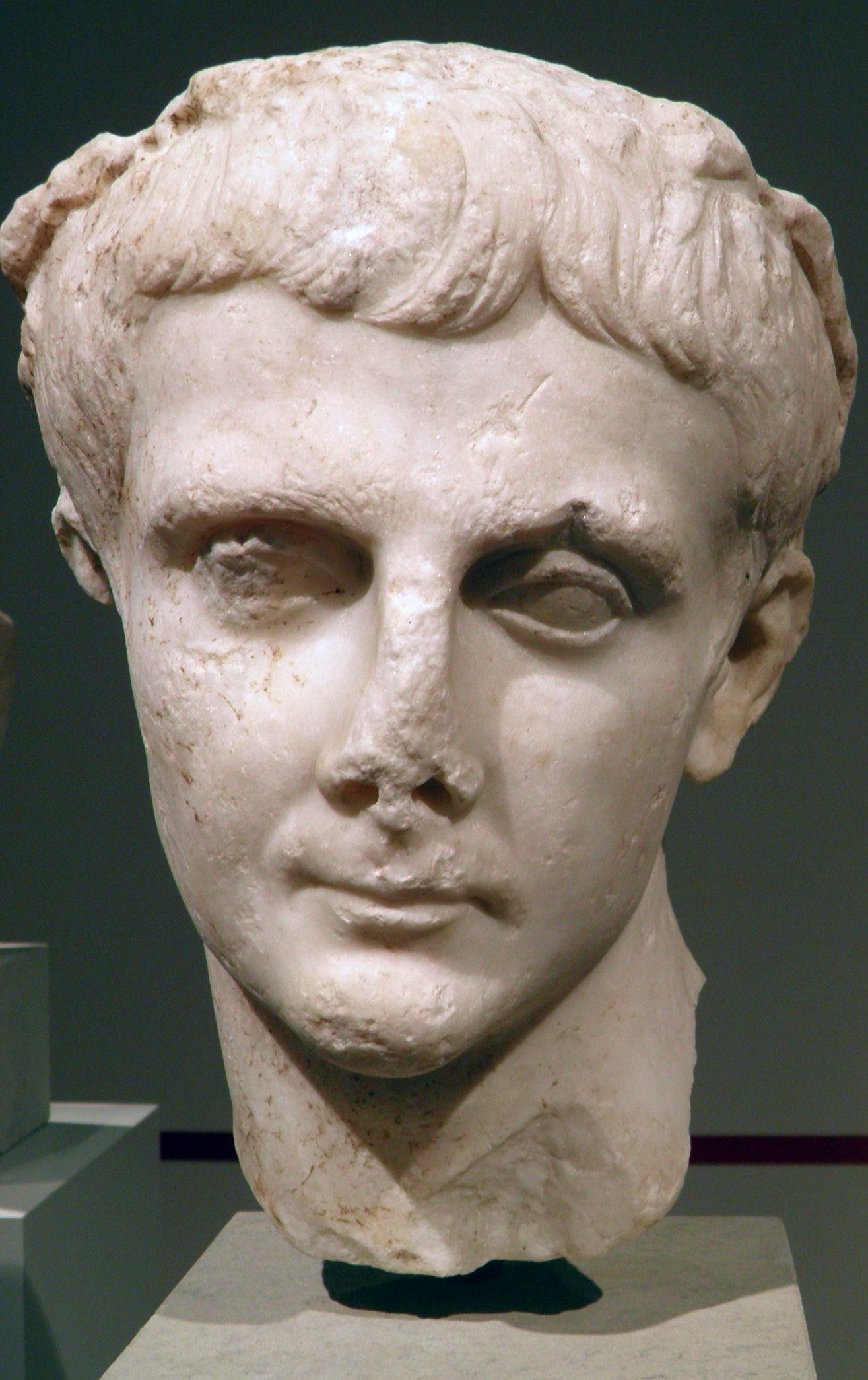
Drusus the Elder who lead the Romans in the campaign
