= Legio XVII =

Roman legion

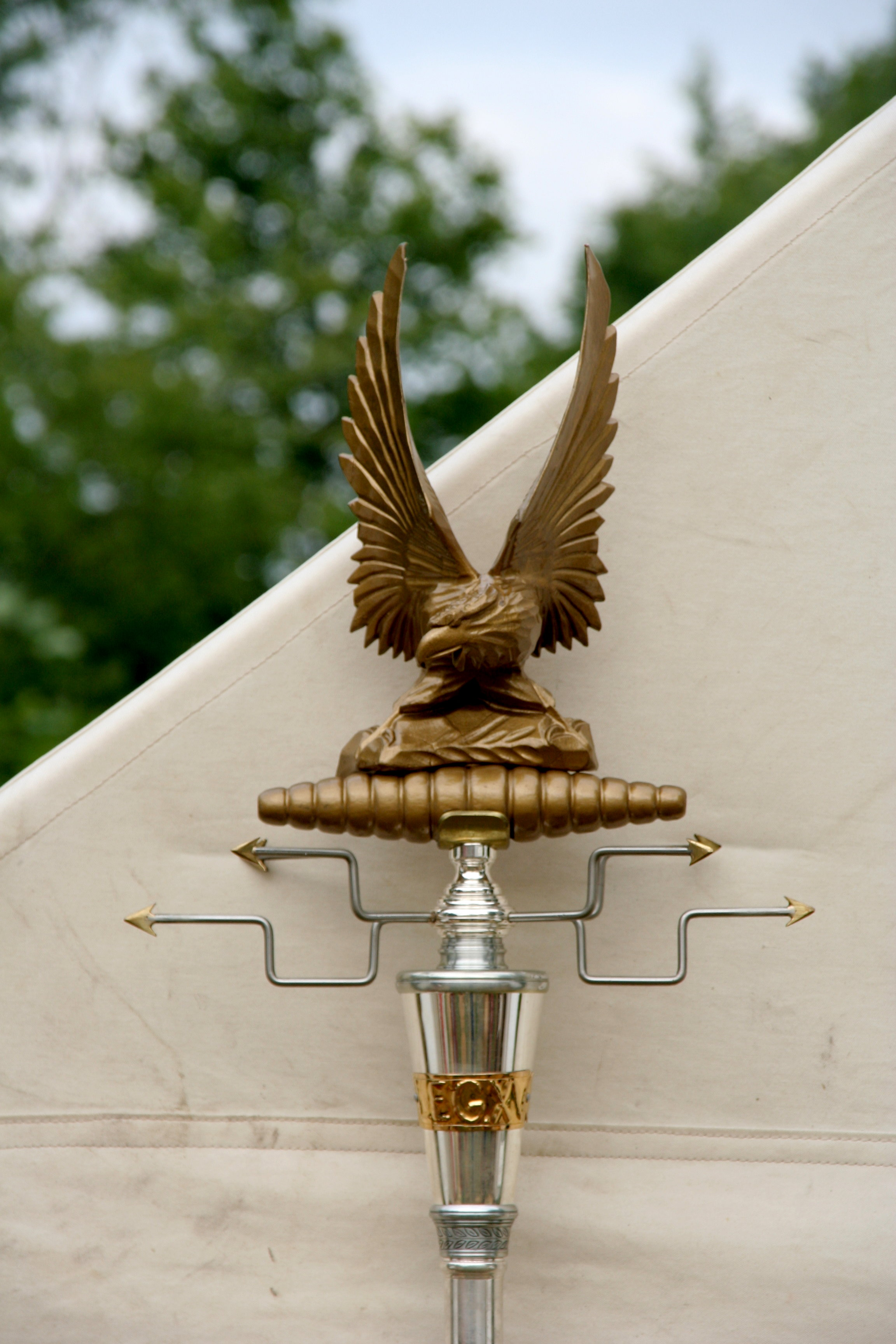
Reconstructed Legionary Eagle

Legio XVII ("Seventeenth Legion") was a legion of the Imperial Roman army. It was founded by Augustus around 41 BC. The legion was destroyed in the Battle of the Teutoburg Forest (September 9, 9). The legion's symbol and cognomen are unknown.

This legion was probably created to deal with Sextus Pompey, the last opponent of the Second Triumvirate, garrisoned in Sicily and threatening Rome's grain supply.

Following the defeat of Antony and Cleopatra in the battle of Actium (31 BC), the legion was stationed in Gaul. In the end of the 1st century BC, the Seventeenth was sent to the Germania provinces in the Rhine and was stationed in Castra Vetera (Xanten). In AD 5, the provinces were pacified and Publius Quinctilius Varus was assigned governor and commander of the Germania army.

On September 9, Arminius, leader of the Cheruscan allies, reported a rebellion in the Rhine area. Without suspecting the information received, Varus took his three legions, the XVII along with XVIII and XIX, and headed west. On 9 September, near modern Osnabrück, the Cheruscii led by Arminius ambushed the governor's army. All three legions were destroyed in what is known as the battle of the Teutoburg Forest and their eagle standards lost. The eagle standards were recovered by the Romans in later years.

After its destruction, the Romans never used this legion number again.

== Attested members ==
Name	Rank	Time frame	Province	Source
Lucius Eggius	Praefectus castrorum	AD 9	Germania Antiqua	Velleius Paterculus, ii. 119

== See also ==
- List of Roman legions
