= Legio XVIII =

Roman legion

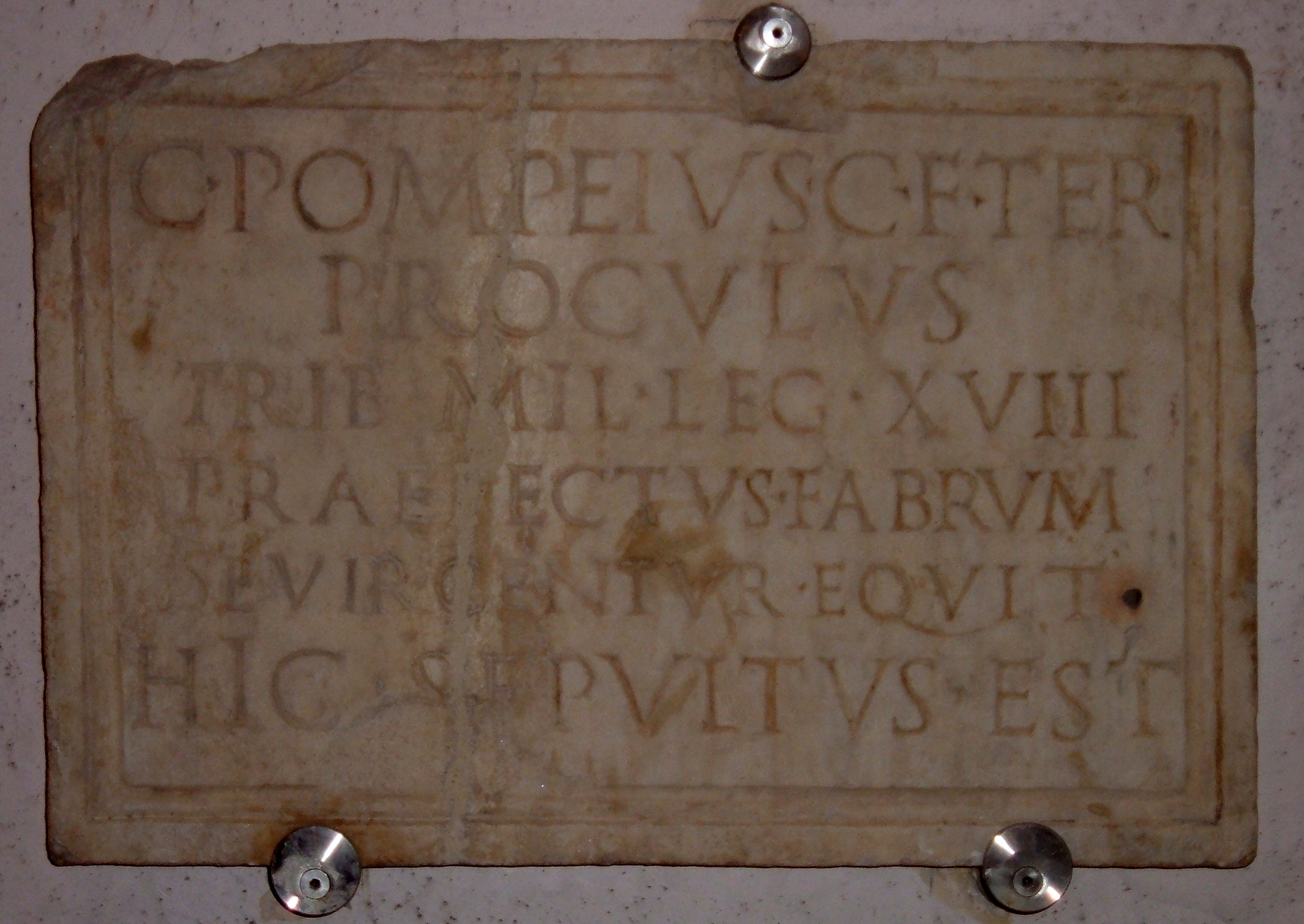
Funerary inscription for Gaius Pompeius Proculus, third son of Gaius, Tribunus Militum of the 18th legion, Praefectus Fabrum, Sevir of the equestrian units, an honorary title. Augustean period, Museo Epigrafico, Terme di Diocleziano, Rome.

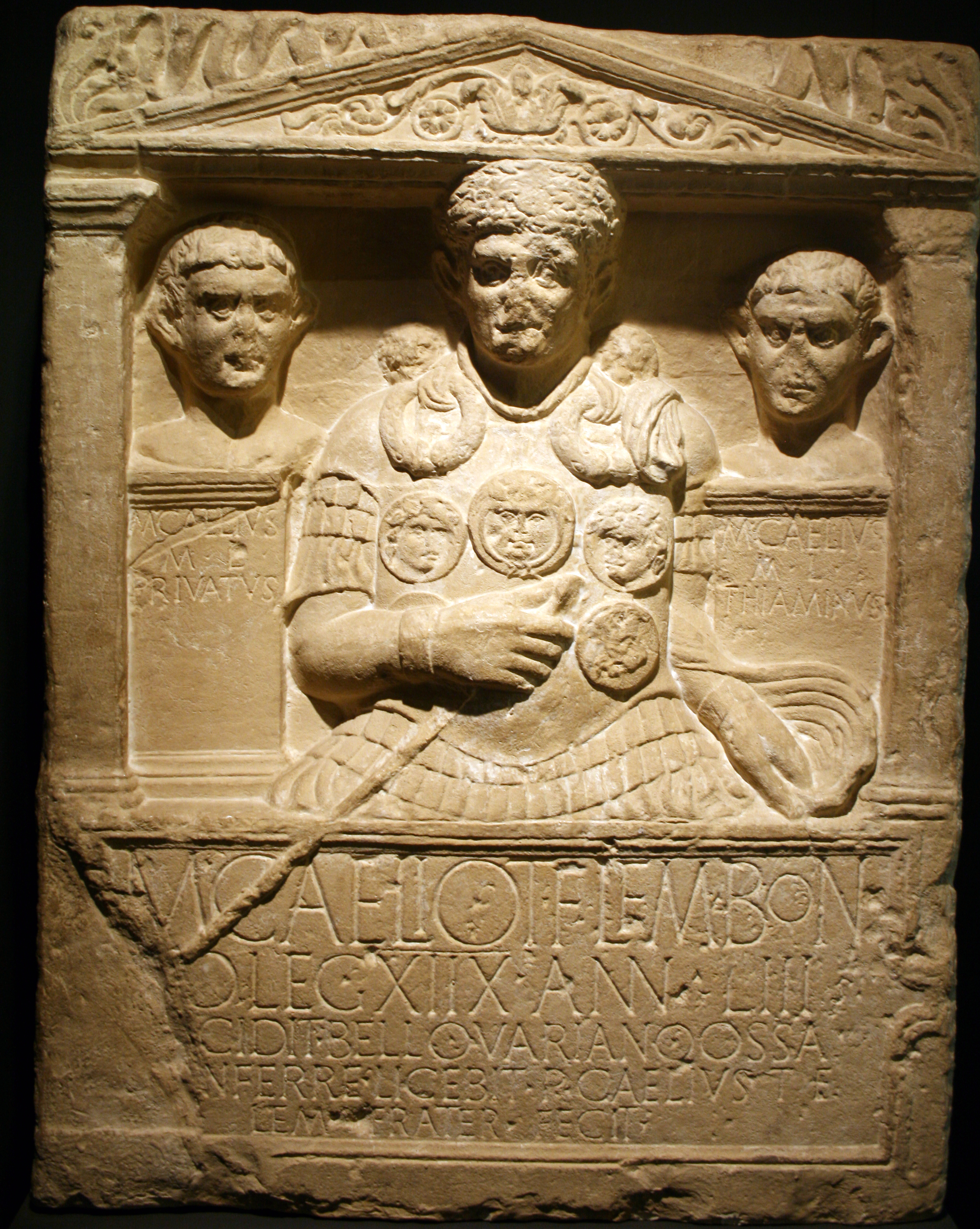
Epitaph of centurion Marcus Caelius, using the "XIIX" spelling

Legio XVIII ("Eighteenth Legion", spelled XVIII or XIIX (Note: See Roman numerals#Other subtractive forms for more details on XIIX)) was a legion of the Imperial Roman army. It was founded ca. 41 BC by the future emperor Augustus. The legion was, along with Legio XVII and Legio XIX, destroyed in the Battle of Teutoburg Forest (September, 9 AD). The legion's symbol and cognomen are unknown.

This legion was probably created to deal with Sextus Pompeius, the last opponent of the Second Triumvirate, garrisoned in Sicily and threatening Rome's grain supply. It was probably one of the eight legions Augustus promised Mark Antony for his campaign against the Parthians, but never delivered.

Following the defeat of Antony and Cleopatra in the battle of Actium (31 BC), the legion was stationed in Gaul. In the end of the 1st century BC, the XVIIIth was sent to the Germania provinces in the Rhine to take part in the enormous army led by Drusus and later Tiberius. In 5, the provinces were pacified. In 7, Publius Quinctilius Varus was assigned governor.

On September 9, Arminius, leader of the Cheruscan allies, reported a rebellion in the Rhine area. Unaware this was an act of deception, Varus took his three legions, the XVIII/XVII/XIX as well as supply/auxiliary forces and headed west. Near modern Osnabrück, the Cheruscii and various other Germanic tribes led by Arminius ambushed the governor's army. All three legions were destroyed in what is known as the Battle of Teutoburg Forest and their eagle standards lost.

After their destruction, the Romans never used these legion numbers (XVII, XVIII and XIX) again.

== Known members of the legion ==
Name	Rank	Time frame	Province	Soldier located in	Veteran located in	Source
Ceionius	Praefectus castrorum	9 AD	Germania Antiqua	?	-	Velleius Paterculus, ii. 119.
Gaius Pompeius Proculus	tribunus militum	?	?	?	Italy	
Marcus Caelius	centurio	?	Raetia?	?	-	
Titus Atidius	Miles	?	?	?	Italia, Venetia et Histria	CIL 5, 2499

== See also ==
- List of Roman legions
