= Legio XIX =

Roman legion

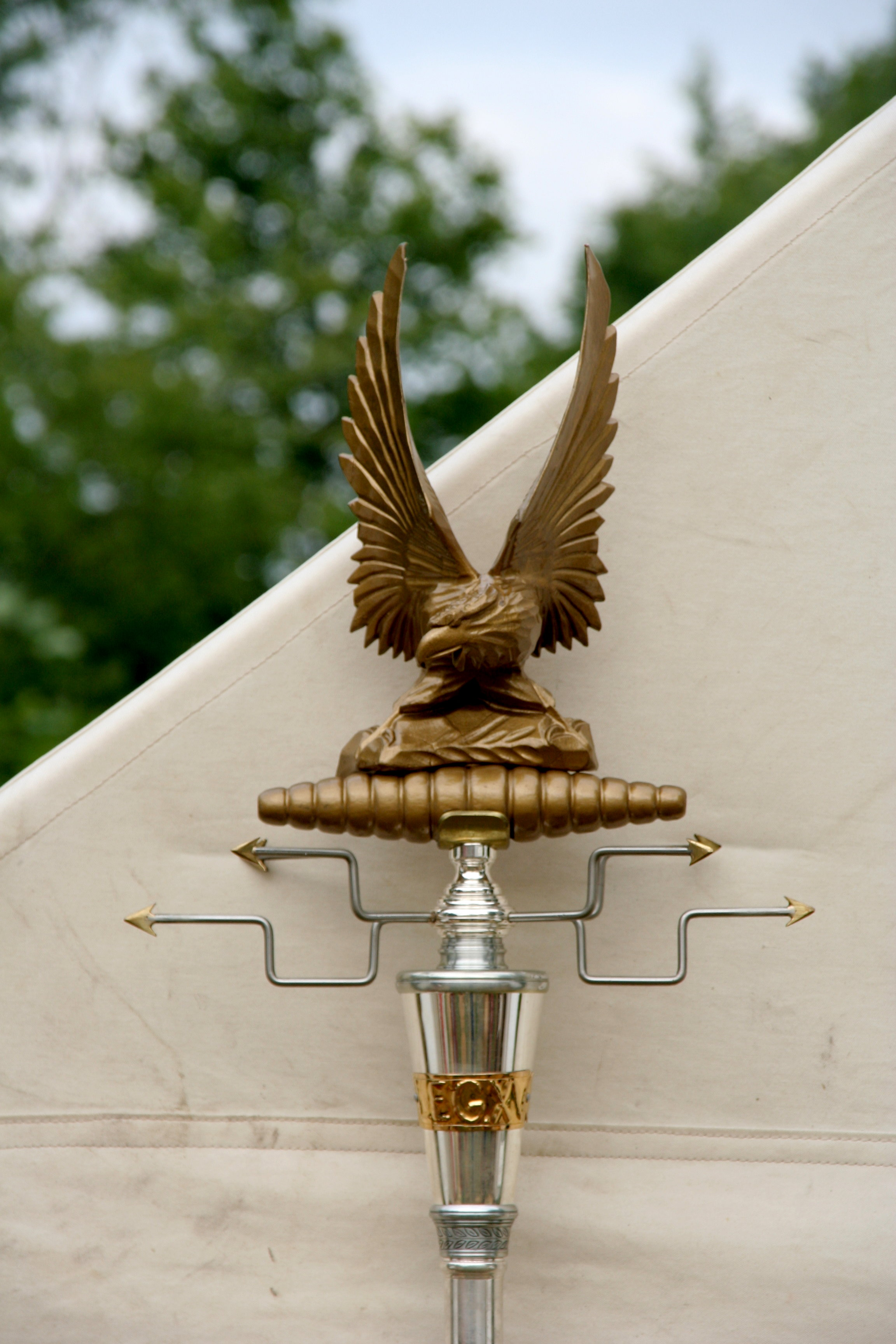
Aquila (reconstruction)

Legio XIX ("Nineteenth Legion") was a legion of the Imperial Roman army. It was destroyed in 9 AD in the Battle of the Teutoburg Forest. The emblem of the XIXth legion is unknown but was probably the Capricorn like other legions levied by Augustus.

== History ==
It was founded in 41 or 40 BC by Augustus. Their first assignment was in Sicily where Sextus Pompey, son of Pompey, was leading a revolt. This revolt put Rome's grain supply in peril and it needed a harsh response.

In 30 BC, veterans of the XIX legion were settled near Pisa, and after that, the rest of the legion was allocated in the Rhine frontier with base camp at Cologne. The XIX legion participated in the German campaigns of Drusus (13–9 BC) and Tiberius (8–5 BC). By the year 5 BC Germania was a Roman province and Publius Quinctilius Varus was assigned as governor.

The legion could have been stationed in Dangstetten. It is possible the reason the legion was stationed here was to police the nearby Roman Road.

In September 9 AD, Arminius, leader of the Cherusci and a Roman ally, set a trap. He had reported a major revolt of one of the western tribes and suggested the return of both governor and his legions to the Rhine. Varus accepted the suggestion and went with the XVII, XVIII and XIX legions. The army was trapped near Osnabrück and was completely destroyed in the Battle of the Teutoburg Forest. Between 16 and 18, Germanicus, the leader of the Rhine armies, looked for the remains of the legions. The Legion XIX Eagle was captured by the Bructeri. In 15 AD troops under the command of Lucius Stertinius rescued the eagle: After its destruction, the Romans never used this legion number again.

== Attested members ==
Name	Rank	Time frame	Source
Gnaeus Lerius	Tribunus angusticlavius	?	CIL 11, 05218
Sextus Abulenius	Centurion	27 BC - 14 AD	CIL 11, 06056
Marcus Virtius	Legionary	10 BC - 30 AD	AE 1974, 00283
Lucius Artorius	Legionary	27 BC - 14 AD	CIL 11, 00348
Sextus Anquirinnius	?	?	CIL 11, 01524

== See also ==
- List of Roman legions
