= List of battles (alphabetical) =

Alphabetical list of historical battles (see also Military history, Lists of battles):
NOTE: Where a year has been used to disambiguate battles, it is the year when the battle started. In some cases, these may still have gone on for several years.

For a free and comprehensive database of recorded battles, visit EveryBattle.

== 7 ==
- Battle of 73 Easting – 1991 – Gulf War

== A ==
- Battle of Aachen – 1944 – World War II
- Battle of Abensberg – 1809 – Napoleonic Wars
- Battle of Abbeville – 1940 – World War II
- Battle of Abukir – 1799 – French Revolution
- Battle of Abu Klea – 1885 – Mahdist War
- Battle of Aclea – 851 – Viking invasions of England
- Battle of Acragas – 406 BCE – Greek–Punic Wars
- Siege of Acre (1189–1191) – Third Crusade
- Siege of Acre (1291) – Fall of the last crusader city
- Siege of Acre (1799) – French Revolution
- Battle of the Admin Box – 1944 – World War II
- Battle of Akroinon – 740 – Arab–Byzantine wars
- Battle of Actium – 31 BCE – Final War of the Roman Republic
- Battle of Ad Decimum – 533 – Vandalic War
- Battle of Adwa – 1896 – First Italo-Ethiopian War
- Battle of Adwalton Moor – 1643 – English Civil War
- Battle of Aegina – 458 BCE – First Peloponnesian War
- Battle of Aegospotami – 405 BCE – Peloponnesian War
- Battle of Agincourt – 1415 – Hundred Years' War
- Battle of Agnadello (a.k.a. Battle of Vaila) – 1509 – Italian Wars
- Battle of Agusan Hill – 1900 – Philippine–American War
- Battle of Ahvenanmaa – 1714 – Great Northern War
- Battle of Ain Jalut – 1260 – Mongol conquests
- First Battle of the Aisne – 1914 – World War I
- Second Battle of the Aisne – 1917 – World War I
- Third Battle of the Aisne – 1918 – World War I
- Battle of Ajnadayn – 634 – Muslim conquest of the Levant
- Battle of Akraba (632) (a.k.a. Battle of Yemama) – "Apostate Wars"
- Battle of Alalia – 535 BCE – Greek–Punic Wars
- Battle of Alamance – 1771 – War of the Regulation
- Battle of al-Bab - 2017 - Syrian Civil War
- Battle of Alam el Halfa – 1942 – World War II
- Battle of the Alamo – 1836 – Texas Revolution
- Battle of Aldenhoven (1794) – French Revolutionary Wars
- Battles of El Alamein – both 1942 – World War II
  - First Battle of El Alamein
  - Second Battle of El Alamein
- Battle of Albarracin – 1937 – Spanish Civil War
- Battle of Alesia – 52 BCE – Gallic Wars
- Battle of Alexandria - 1801 - Napoleonic Wars
- Battle of Alessandria – 1391 – First Florentine–Milanese War
- Battle of Alfambra – 1938 – Spanish Civil War
- Battle of Alfarrobeira – 1449
- Battle of Algeciras – 1344 – Reconquista
- Battle of Aljubarrota – 1385 – 1383–1385 Portuguese interregnum
- Battle of Alma – 1854 – Crimean War
- Battle of Almansa – 1707 – War of the Spanish Succession
- Battle of Almendralejo – Spanish Civil War
- Battle of Almonacid – 1809 – Napoleonic Wars
- Battle of Al-Safra – 1812 – Ottoman–Saudi War
- Battle of Ambarawa - 1945 - Indonesian National Revolution
- Battle of Amberg – French Revolutionary Wars
- Battle of Amiens – 1870 – Franco-Prussian War
- Battle of Amiens – 1918 – World War I
- Battle of Amphipolis – 422 BCE – Peloponnesian War
- Battle of Amstetten – 1805 – War of the Third Coalition
- Battle of Angaur – 1944 – World War II
- Battle of Ankara (a.k.a. Battle of Angora) – 1402 – Timur's Invasion of Turkey
- Battle of Antietam – 1862 – American Civil War
- Battle of Antioch (218) – Inter-Roman battle
- Battle of Antioch (1097) – First Crusade
- Siege of Antioch (1268) – Crusades
- Battle of Antwerp (1584) – Dutch Revolt
- Battle of Antwerp (1832) – Ten Days' Campaign
- Battle of Antwerp (1914) – World War I
- Battle of Antwerp (1944) – World War II
- Battle of Anzen – 838 – Byzantine–Arab Wars
- Battle of Aong – 1857 – Indian Rebellion of 1857
- Siege of Apia – 1889 – Second Samoan Civil War
- Battle of Araure – 1813 – Venezuelan War of Independence
- Battle of Arbedo – 1422 – Milanese led by Francesco Bussone vs. Swiss
- Battle of Arcole (1796) – French Revolutionary Wars
- Battle of Arcis-sur-Aube – 1814 – Napoleonic Wars
- Battle of the Ardennes – World War I
- Battle of Arklow – 1798 – Irish Rebellion of 1798
- Battle of Arnhem – 1944 – World War II (Operation Market Garden)
- Battle of Arras (1654) – Thirty Years' War (Spanish–French extension)
- Battle of Arras (1917) – World War I
- Battle of Arsuf – 1191 – Third Crusade
- Battle of Artemisium – 480 BCE – Greco-Persian Wars
- Battle of Artois-Loos – 1915 – World War I
- Battle of Asal Uttar – 1965 – Indo-Pakistani War of 1965
- Battle of Ascalon – 1099 – First Crusade
- Battle of Ashdown – 871 – Viking-Saxon wars
- Battle of the Assunpink Creek – 1777 – American Revolutionary War
- Battle of Athens (Alabama) – 1864 – American Civil War
- Battle of Athens (Missouri) – 1861 – American Civil War
- Battle of Attu - 1943 - World War II
- Battle of Auerstaedt – 1806 – Napoleonic Wars
- Battle of Austerlitz – 1805 – Napoleonic Wars
- Battle of the Atlantic – World War I
- Battle of the Atlantic – World War II
- Battle of Auberoche – 1345 – Hundred Years' War
- Battle of Audenaarde – 1708 – War of the Spanish Succession
- Battle of Ayacucho – 1824 – Peruvian War of Independence
- Battle of Azaz (1030) – Arab–Byzantine Wars
- Battle of Azaz (1125)

== B ==
- Battle of Badajoz – 1936 – Spanish Civil War
- Battle of Badung Strait (18–20 February 1942)
- Battle of Badr (13 March 624)
- Battle of the Baggage – 737 – Umayyad–Turgesh Wars
- Battle of the Bagradas River (239 BC) – Carthage's Mercenary War
- Battle of the Bagradas River (49 BC) – Caesar's Civil War
- Battle of Baekgang – 663 – Baekje–Tang War
- Battle of Bakhmach – 1918 – World War I
- Battle of Balaclava – 1854 – Crimean War
- Battle of Balikpapan 1st battle (23–24 Jan, 1942) (Pacific Campaign of WW2)
- Battle of Balikpapan 2nd battle (1–21 July 1945) (Pacific Campaign of WW2)
- Battle of Bamianshan – 1950 – Chinese Civil War
- Battle of Bang Bo – 1885 – Sino-French War
- Battle of Bang Rajan – 1767 – Burmese–Siamese wars
- Battle of Bannockburn – 1314 – First War of Scottish Independence
- Battle of Bantam - 1601 - Dutch-Portuguese War
- Battle of Baoyang (May 1902) Moro Rebellion
- Operation Barbarossa – 1941 – World War II
- Battle of Barfleur – 1692 – Nine Years' War
- Battle of Barnet – 1471 – Wars of the Roses
- Battle of Basantar – 1971 – Indo-Pakistani War of 1971
- Battle of Bassorah (a.k.a. Battle of the Camel) – 656 – First Fitna
- Battle of Bataan – 1943 – World War II
- Battle of Bataan (1945) – World War II
- Battle of Bathys Ryax – 872–878 – Byzantine-Paulician Wars
- Battle of Batin – 1810 – Russo-Turkish War
- Battle of Bautzen – 1813 – Napoleonic Wars
- Battle of Beda Fomm – 1941 – World War II
- Battle of Beecher Island – 1868 – American Indian Wars
- Battle of Beersheba – 1917 – World War I
- Battle of Beirut – 1941 – World War II
- Battle of Belleau Wood – 1918 – World War I
- Battle of Benburb – 1646 – Irish Confederate Wars
- Battle of Benevento – 1266 – The Wars of the Guelphs and Ghibellines
- Battle of Beneventum (275 BC) – Rise of Rome
- Battle of Benfleet – 894 – Viking invasion of England
- Battle of Berea – 1852 – Xhosa Wars
- Battle of Berestechko – 1651 – The Deluge
- Battle of Bergen (1799) – French Revolutionary Wars
- Battle of the Bering Sea – 1943 – World War II
- Battle of Berlin (RAF campaign) - 1943-44 - World War II
- Battle of Berlin - 1945 - World War
- Battle of Beverwijk - 1997 -
- Battle of Biak – 1944 – World War II
- Battle of Bilbao – 1937 – Spanish Civil War
- Battle of Bilin River – 1942 – World War II
- Battle of Binakayan-Dalahican – 1896 – Philippine Revolution
- Battle of Bitonto – 1734 – War of the Polish Succession
- Battle of Bismarck Sea – 1943 – World War II
- Battle of Blanchetaque – 1346 – Hundred Years' War
- Battle of Blenheim – 1704 – War of the Spanish Succession
- Battle of Blood River – 1838 -
- Battle of Blore Heath – 1459 – Wars of the Roses
- Battle of Borodino – 1812 – Napoleonic Wars
- Battle of Borysthenes – 1512 – Muscovite–Lithuanian Wars
- Battle of the Bosnian Highlands – 927 – Croatian–Bulgarian wars
- Battle of Bosworth Field – 1485 – Wars of the Roses
- Battle of Boulou – 1794 – French Revolutionary Wars
- Battle of Bouvines – 1214 – Anglo-French War (1202–14)
- Battle of Boyacá – 1819 – Colombian War of Independence
- Battle of the Boyne – 1690 – Williamite War in Ireland
- Battle of Breisach – 1638 – Thirty Years' War
- Battle of Breitenfeld (1631) – Thirty Years' War
- Battle of Breitenfeld (1642) – Thirty Years' War
- Battle of Brentford – 1642 – English Civil War
- Battle of Brienne – 1814 – Napoleonic Wars
- Battle of Britain – 1940 – World War II
- Battle of Brandywine – 1777 – American Revolutionary War
- Battle of Brody – 1941 – World War II
- Battle of Brooklyn (a.k.a. Battle of Long Island) – 1776 – American Revolutionary War
- Battle of Brunete – 1937 – Spanish Civil War
- Battle of Brunanburh – 937
- Battle of Brunkeberg – 1471 – Dano-Swedish War (1470–71)
- Battle of Bråvalla – ca 750 – Danish–Swedish wars
- Battle of Bubat - 1357
- Battle of Buçaco – 1810 – Peninsular War
- Battle of Bud Bagsak –1913 – Moro Rebellion
- First Battle of Bud Dajo – 1906 – Moro Rebellion
- Second Battle of Bud Dajo – 1911 – Moro Rebellion
- Battle of Buena Vista – 1847 – Mexican–American War
- Brusilov Offensive – 1916 – World War I
- Battle of the Bulge – 1944 – World War II
- First Battle of Bull Run – 1861 – American Civil War
- Second Battle of Bull Run – 1862 – American Civil War
- Battle of Bunker Hill – 1775 – American Revolutionary War
- Battle of Burgos – 1808 – Napoleonic Wars
- Battle of Burkersdorf – 1762 – Seven Years' War
- Battle of Buxar - 1764

== C ==
- Battle of Cadiz – 1587 – Anglo-Spanish War (1585–1604)
- Battle of Caen (1346) – Hundred Years' War
- Battle for Caen – 1944 – Second World War
- Battle of Cagayan de Misamis – 1900 – Philippine–American War
- Battle of Caloocan – 1899 – Philippine–American War
- Second Battle of Caloocan – 1899 – Philippine–American War
- Battle of Cambrai – 1917 – World War I
- Battle of the Camel
- Battle of Camlann – 573, the only mentioning of King Arthur
- Battle of Camperdown – 1797 – French Revolutionary Wars
- Battle of Cannae – 216 BC – Second Punic War
- Battle of Cape Cherchell – 1937 – Spanish Civil War
- Battle of Cape Machichaco – 1937 – Spanish Civil War
- Battle of Cape Palos – 1938 – Spanish Civil War
- Battle of Cape St. Vincent (1780) – American Revolutionary War
- Battle of Cape St. Vincent (1797) – French Revolutionary Wars
- Battle of Caporetto (a.k.a. Twelfth Battle of Isonzo) – 1917 – World War I
- Battle of Capua – Second Punic War
- Siege of Capua (1734) – War of the Polish Succession
- Battle of Carabobo – 1821 – Venezuelan War of Independence
- Battle of Carbisdale – 1650
- Battle of Carchemish – 605 BC – Babylonian–Egyptian War
- Battle of Carillon – 1758 – Seven Years' War
- Battle of Carthage (c. 149 BC) – Third Punic War
- Battle of Carthage (533) (see Battle of Ad Decimum)
- Battle of Carthage (698) – Moslem Conquest of North Africa
- Battle of Casalecchio – 1402 – Third Florentine–Milanese War
- Battle of Castle Turjak – 1943 – World War II
- Battle of Cassel – 1677 – Franco-Dutch War
- Battle of Cassinga – 1978 – South African Border War
- Battle of Castillon – 1453 – Hundred Years' War
- Battle of the Catalaunian Plains – 451 – Fall of the Western Roman Empire
- Battle of the Caudine Forks – 321 BC – Samnite Wars
- Second Battle of Cawnpore – 1857 – Indian Rebellion of 1857
- Battle of Cedynia – 972 – First Polish–German War
- Battle of Cefn Digoll – 630
- Battle of Cesky-Brod (see Battle of Lipany)
- Conquest of Ceuta – 1415 – Moroccan–Portuguese conflicts
- Battle of Chaeronea (338 BC) – Wars of Alexander the Great
- Battle of Chaeronea (86 BC) – First Mithridatic War
- Battle of Chalcis – 429 BC – Peloponnesian War
- Battle of Châlons – 274 – Crisis of the Third Century
- Battle of Champaubert – 1814 – Napoleonic Wars
- Battle of Chancellorsville – 1863 – American Civil War
- Battle of Changsha (1911) – Xinhai Revolution
- Battle of Changsha (1939) – Second Sino-Japanese War
- Battle of Changsha (1941) – Second Sino-Japanese War
- Battle of Changsha (1942) – Second Sino-Japanese War as merged into World War II
- Battle of Changsha (1944) (a.k.a. Changsha-Hengyang) – Second Sino-Japanese War as merged into World War II
- Battle of Changping – 260 BC – Warring States Period
- Battle of Chapultepec – 1847 –Mexican–American War
- Battle of the Chateauguay – 1813 – War of 1812
- Battle of Chausa – 1539 – Sher Shah Sur's Campaigns
- Battle of the Chernaya – 1855 – Crimean War
- Battle of the Chesapeake – 1781 – American Revolutionary War
- Battle of Chesma – 1770 – Russo-Turkish War (1768–1774)
- Battle of Chickamauga – 1863 – American Civil War
- Battle of Chippawa – 1812 – War of 1812
- Battle of Chiset – 1373 – Hundred Years War
- Battle of Chojnice (a.k.a. Battle of Conitz) – 1454 – Thirteen Years' War
- Battle of the Ch'ongch'on River – 1950 – Korean War
- Battle of Chosin Reservoir – 1950 – Korean War
- Battle of Chrysopolis – 324 – Civil wars of the Tetrarchy
- Battle of Ciudad Real – 1809 – Napoleonic Wars
- Battle of Civitate – 1053 – Norman vs. Swabian-Italian-Lombard Papal coalition
- Battle of Clyst St. Mary – 1549 – Prayer Book Rebellion
- Battle of Cocherel – 1364 – French vs. the forces of Charles II of Navarre
- Battle of Cold Harbor – 1864 – American Civil War
- Battle of Colenso – 1899 – Second Boer War
- Assault on Copenhagen (1659) – Northern Wars
- Battle of Copenhagen (1801) – French Revolutionary Wars
- Battle of Copenhagen (1807) – Napoleonic Wars
- Battle of the Coral Sea – 1942 – World War II
- Battle of Coronea – 447 BC – pre-Peloponnesian War
- Battle of Coronel – 1914 – World War I
- Battle of Covadonga – 722 – Umayyad conquest of Hispania
- Battle of Cracow – 1655 – The Deluge
- Battle of Craonne – 1814 – Napoleonic Wars
- Battle of Cravant – 1423 – Hundred Years' War
- Battle of the Crater – 1864 – American Civil War
- Battle of Crécy – 1346 – Hundred Years' War
- Battle of Crete – 1941 – World War II
- Battle of Crucifix Hill – 1944 – World War II
- Battle of Crysler's Farm – 1813 – War of 1812
- Battle of Culloden (a.k.a. Culloden Moor) – 1746 – Jacobite rising of 1745
- Battle of Cunaxa – 401 BC – Greco-Persian Wars
- Battle of Cut Knife – 1885 – North-West Rebellion
- Battle of Culiacán - 2019 - Mexican drug war

== D ==
- Battle of Dairen – 1904 – Russo-Japanese War
- Battle of Dakar – 1940 – World War II
- Battle of Damour – 1941 – World War II
- Battle of Darzab - 2018 - War in Afghanistan (2001–2021)
- Battle of the Defile – 731 – Umayyad–Turgesh Wars
- Battle of Delium – 424 BC – Peloponnesian War
- Battle of Debaltseve – 2015 – War in Donbas
- Battle of Denain – 1712 – War of the Spanish Succession
- Battle of Deorham (a.k.a. Dyrham) – 577 – Anglo-Saxon conquest of England
- Battle of Dessau Bridge – (1626) – Thirty Years' War
- Siege of Detroit – 1812 – War of 1812
- Battle of Dettingen – 1743 – War of the Austrian Succession
- Battle of Dien Bien Phu – 1954 – First Indochina War
- Battle of Diersheim (1797) – French Revolutionary Wars
- Battle of Didgori – 1121 – Georgian–Seljuk wars
- Siege of Diriyah – 1818 – Ottoman–Saudi War
- Battle of Diu – 1509 – Portuguese-Ottoman War
- Battle of Dogger Bank (1781) – American Revolutionary War
- Battle of Dogger Bank (1915) – World War I
- Battle of Domstadtl (Domašov) – 1758 – Seven Years' War
- Battle of Dorylaeum – 1097 – First Crusade
- Battle of Dražgoše – 1942 – World War II
- Battle of Drepana – 249 BC – First Punic War
- Battle of Dresden – 1813 – Napoleonic Wars
- Battle of Dufile – 1888 – Emin Pasha – Moyo District – Uganda
- Battle of Dumlupınar – 1922 – Greco-Turkish War (1919–22)
- Battle of the Dunes (1658) – Franco-Spanish War (1635–59)
- Battle of Dunkirk (a.k.a. Dunkerque) – 1940 – World War II
- Battle of Dunbar (1296) – Wars of Scottish Independence
- Battle of Dunbar (1650) – Third English Civil War
- Battle of Dungan's Hill – 1647 – Irish Confederate Wars
- Battle of Dun Nechtain (a/k/a Battle of Dunnichen)
- Battle of Dupplin Moor – 1332 – Second War of Scottish Independence
- Battle of Dybbøl – 1864 – Second Schleswig War

== E ==
- Battle of Eastern Henan – 1930 – Central Plains War
- Battle of the Ebro – 1938 – Spanish Civil War (1936–39)
- Battle of Eckmühl – 1800 – Napoleonic Wars
- Battle of Edgehill – 1642 – English Civil War
- Battle of Elchingen – 1805 – War of the Third Coalition
- Battle of Elena – 1877 – Russo-Turkish War (1877–78)
- Battle of Elvina – 1809 – Napoleonic Wars
- Battle of Embabo – 1882
- Battle of Engen – 1800 – French Revolutionary Wars
- Battle of Enogai – 1942 – World War II
- Siege of Eshowe – 1879 – Anglo-Zulu War
- Battle of Espinosa de los Monteros – 1808 – Napoleonic Wars
- Battle of Essling-Aspern – 1809 – Napoleonic Wars
- Battle of the Eurymedon – c. 466 BC – Greco-Persian Wars
- Battle of Evesham – 1265 – Second Barons' War of England
- Siege of Exeter (c. 630) – almost certainly fictional
- Battle of Exeter – 1068 – Norman conquest of England
- Siege of Exeter – 1549 – Prayer Book Rebellion
- Battle of Eylau – 1807 – Napoleonic Wars

== F ==
- Battle of Fajardo – 1898 – Spanish-American War
- Battle of the Falaise Gap – 1944 – World War II
- Battle of Falkirk – 1298 – Wars of Scottish Independence
- Battle of Falkirk Muir – 1746 – Jacobite rising of 1745
- Battle of the Falkland Islands – 1914 – World War I
- First Battle of Fallujah – April 2004 – American-led operation of the Iraq War
- Second Battle of Fallujah – November and December 2004 – American-British-Iraqi offensive of the Iraq War
- Third Battle of Fallujah – 2016 – Iraqi government operation against ISIL
- Battle of Fehrbellin – 1675 – Northern Wars
- Battle of Fei River – 383 – Wars of the Eastern Jin Dynasty
- Battle of Five Forks – 1865 – American Civil War
- Battle of Fleurus (1622) – Thirty Years' War
- Battle of Fleurus (1690) – Nine Years' War
- Battle of Fleurus (1794) – French Revolutionary Wars
- Battle of Flodden Field – 1513 – War of the League of Cambrai
- Battle of Focșani – 1789 – Russo-Turkish War (1787–92)
- Battle of Fontenoy (841) (Latin Fontanetum, near Auxerre, and now Fontenoy-en-Puisaye) – Carolingian Civil War
- Battle of Fontenay-le-Comte – 1793 – French Revolutionary Wars*
- Battle of Fontenoy – 1745 (in Belgium) – War of the Austrian Succession
- Battle of Formigny – 1450 – Hundred Years' War
- Battle of Fornovo – 1495 – Invasion of Italy by Charles VIII
- Battle of Fort Charlotte – 1780 – American Revolutionary War
- Battle of Fort Donelson – 1862 – American Civil War
- Siege of Fort Zeelandia – 1661 – Sino–Dutch conflicts
- Battle of Frankfurt an der Oder – 1631 – Thirty Years' War
- Battle of Fredericksburg – 1862 – American Civil War
- Battle of Freiburg – 1644 – Thirty Years' War
- Battle of Freiberg – 1762 – Seven Years' War
- Battle of Friedland – 1807 – Napoleonic Wars
- Battle of the Frontiers – 1914
- Battle of Fuentes de Oñoro – 1811 – Napoleonic Wars
- Battle of Fulford – 1066 – Viking invasion of England
- Battle of Fürth – 1632 – Thirty Years' War

== G ==
- Gallipoli Campaign – 1915 – World War I
- Battle of Garibpur – 1971 – Indo-Pakistani War of 1971
- Battle of Gaugamela – 331 BC – Wars of Alexander the Great
- First Battle of Gaza – 1917 – World War I
- Second Battle of Gaza – 1917 – World War I
- Battle of Geisberg (1793) – French Revolutionary Wars
- Battle of Germantown – 1777 – American Revolutionary War
- Battle of Gettysburg – 1863 – American Civil War
- Battle of Gilboa – 1000 BC – Israeli–Philistine Wars
- Battle of Gingindlovu – 1879 – Anglo-Zulu War
- Battle of Glen Shiel – 1719 – Jacobite rising of 1719
- Glorious First of June – 1794 – French Revolutionary Wars
- Siege of Gloucester – 1643 – English Civil War
- Gorlice–Tarnów Offensive – 1915 – World War I
- Battle of Grahamstown – 1819 – 5th Xhosa War
- Battle of Grandson – 1476 – Burgundian Wars
- Battle of the Granicus – 334 BC – Wars of Alexander the Great
- Battle of the Grapevine Creek – 1888 – Hatfield–McCoy feud
- Battle of Grathe Heath – 1157 – Dispute over Danish throne
- Battle of Gravelines – 1588 – Spanish Armada
- Battle of Grengam – 1720 – Great Northern War
- Battle of Grotniki – 1439 – Hussite Wars
- Battle of Grunwald – 1410 – Polish–Lithuanian–Teutonic War
- Guadalcanal campaign – 1942 – World War II
- Battle of Guadalete – 711 – Umayyad conquest of Hispania
- Battle of Guam – 1941 – World War II
- Second Battle of Guam – 1944 – World War II
- Battle of Guandu – 200 – Conquest of Northern China
- Battle of Guangzhou – 1927
- Second Battle of Guangzhou – 1929
- Second Battle of Guilin – 1930 – Central Plains War
- Battle of Gully Ravine – 1915 – World War I – Gallipoli Campaign
- Battle of Gumbinnen – 1914 – World War I
- Battle of Gvozd Mountain (Peter's Mountain) – 1097 – Croatian–Hungarian War of 1097

Kosovo War -Battle of Glođane -Second battle of Glođane

== H ==
- Battle of Halidon Hill – 1333 – Second War of Scottish Independence
- Battle of Halule – 691 BC – Neo-Assyrian Border Wars
- Battle of Halmyros – 1311 – Catalan Company
- Battle of Halys – 585 BC – Greco-Persian Wars
- Battle of Hampton Roads – 1862 – American Civil War
- Siege of Harfleur – 1415 – Hundred Years' War
- Battle of Harlaw – 1411 – Aberdeenshire, Scotland
- Battle of Hartmannswillerkopf – 1915 – Alsace
- Battle of Hastings – 1066 – Norman conquest of England
- Battle of Hattin – 1187 – Crusades
- Battle of Le Havre – 1944 – World War II
- Battle of Heligoland (1864) – Second Schleswig War
- Battle of Heligoland Bight (1914) – World War I
- Battle of the Hellespont – 324
- Battle of Helsingborg – 1362 – Danish–German War
- Battle of Hemmingstedt – 1500 – Danish invasion in Dithmarschen, Germany
- Battle of Heraclea – 280 BC – Pyrrhic War
- Battle of Hill 60 (Gallipoli) – 1915 – World War I – Gallipoli Campaign
- Battle of Hill 60 (Western Front) – 1915 – World War I – Western Front
- Battle of Hilli – 1971 – Indo-Pakistani War of 1971
- Battle of Hlobane – 1879 – Anglo-Zulu War
- Battle of Höchst – 1622 – Thirty Years' War
- First Battle of Höchstädt – 1703 – War of the Spanish Succession
- Battle of Höchstädt (1800) – French Revolutionary Wars
- Battle of Hohenfriedberg – 1745 – Second Silesian War and War of the Austrian Succession
- Battle of Hohenlinden – 1800 – French Revolutionary Wars
- Battle of Hondschoote (1793) – French Revolutionary Wars
- Battle of Hopton Heath – 1643 – First English Civil War
- Battle of Huế – 1968 – Vietnam War
- Hundred Regiments Offensive – 1940 – Second Sino-Japanese War
- Battle of the Hydaspes – 326 BC – Wars of Alexander the Great

== I ==
- Battle of Iena – 1806 – Napoleonic Wars
- Battle of Ilipa – 206 BC – Second Punic War
- Battle of Ilovaisk – 2014 – War in Donbas
- Battle of Inkerman – 1854 – Crimean War
- Battle of Intombe – 1879 – Anglo-Zulu War
- Battle of Inverlochy (1431)
- Battle of Inverlochy (1645) – 1645 – Scottish Civil War
- Battle of Irtysh River – 657 – Tang campaigns against the Western Turks
- Battle of Isaszeg – 1849 – Hungarian War of Independence
- Battle of Issus – 333 BC – Wars of Alexander the Great
- Battle of Ituzaingó – 1827 – Cisplatine War
- Battle of Iwo Jima – 1945 – World War II
- Battle of the Iron Bridge – 637 – Arab–Byzantine wars
- Battle of the Ironclads (a.k.a. Monitor vs. Merrimack, Battle of Hampton Roads) – 1862 – American Civil War
- Battle of Isandlwana – Anglo-Zulu War
- Battle of Isaszeg -1849
- Battle of Isonzo (489)
- Battles of the Isonzo – World War I – series of eleven related battles, ending with the Battle of Caporetto
- Battle of the Imjin River - 1951 - Korean War

== J ==
- Battle of Jackson, Mississippi – 1863 – American Civil War
- Battle of Jackson, Tennessee – 1862 – American Civil War
- Battle of Jankau – 1645 – Thirty Years' War
- Battle of Jarama – 1937 Spanish Civil War
- Battle of the Java Sea – 1942 – World War II
- Battle of Jeddah – 1813 – Ottoman–Saudi War
- Battle of Jemappes – 1792 – War of the First Coalition
- Battle of Jena–Auerstedt – 1806 – War of the Fourth Coalition
- Battle of Jinan – 1930 – Central Plains War
- Battle of Jutland – 1916 – World War I

== K ==
- Battle of Kabul (1842) – First Anglo-Afghan War
- Battle of Kadesh – 1274 BC – Second Syrian campaign of Ramesses II
- Battle of Kakarong de Sili – 1987 – Philippine Revolution
- Battle of Kambula – 1879 – Anglo-Zulu War
- Battle of Kampar - 1941 - malayan campaign
- Battle of Kanauj – 1540 – Sher Shah Sur's campaigns
- Battle of Kapyong 1951 – Korean War
- Battle of Karkar – 854 BC or 853 BC – Assyrian conquest of Aram
- Battle of Kharistan – 737 – Umayyad–Turgesh wars
- Battle of Kepaniwai – 1790 – Unification of the Hawaiian Islands
- Battle of Khafji – 1991 – Gulf War
- Siege of Khartoum – 1884–5 – Mahdist War
- Battle of Khartoum – 2023 – Third Sudanese Civil War
- Siege of Kiev – 898 – Hungarian migration to the west
- Siege of Kiev – 968 – By the Pechenigs against the Kievan Rus
- Siege of Kiev (1017), unsuccessful siege by the Pechenigs
- Capture of Kiev (1018) by Bolesław I the Brave
- Kiev uprising (1018), successful uprising against poles
- Siege of Kiev (1036), defeat of the Pechenigs by Yaroslav the Wise
- Sack of Kiev (1169), by a coalition assembled by Vladimir-Suzdal prince Andrey Bogolyubsky
- Siege of Kiev (1203), by Rurik Rostislavich
- Siege of Kiev (1240), during the Mongol invasion of Rus'
- Sack of Kiev (1299), during the war between Toqta against Nogay and the Polovtsy
- Sack of Kiev (1399), by Temür Qutlugh
- Sack of Kiev (1416), by Edigu against the Grand Duchy of Lithuania
- Sack of Kiev (1482), by Meñli I Giray against the Grand Duchy of Lithuania
- Sack of Kiev (1651), by Janusz Radziwiłł
- Siege of Kiev (1658), unsuccessful siege by Ivan Vyhovsky
- Kiev Arsenal January Uprising, January 1918
- Battle of Kiev (1918), a February Bolshevik military operation of Petrograd and the Moscow Red Guard against the Rada forces
- Battle of Kiev (January 1919), an offensive by elements of the Ukrainian Front of the Red Army to capture Kiev
- Capture of Kiev by the White Army, August 1919
- Battle of Kiev (December 1919), the third of three battles fought in Kiev in 1919
- Kiev offensive (1920), part of the Polish-Soviet War
- Battle of Kiev (1941), a major Axis victory over the Soviets during the Second World War
- Battle of Kiev (1943), a Soviet victory in the Second World War
- Battle of Killiecrankie – 1689 – Jacobite rising of 1689
- Siege of Kimberley – 1899–1900 – Second Boer War
- Battle of Kings Mountain – 1780 – part of American Revolution
- Battle of Kummuh – 745
- Battle of Kircholm – 1605 – War between Sweden and Polish–Lithuanian Commonwealth for the Inflants
- Battle of Kleidion – 1014 – Byzantine–Bulgarian wars
- Battle of Klushino – 1610 – Poles defeat Russians during Time of Troubles in Russia
- Battle of Knocknanuss – 1647 – Irish Confederate Wars
- Battle of Kōan – 1281 – Mongol invasions of Japan
- Battle of Kolín – 1757 – Seven Years' War
- Battle of Kolubara – 1914 – World War I
- Battle of Königgrätz – 1866 – Austro-Prussian War
- Battle of Kopidnadon – 788 – Arab–Byzantine wars
- Battle of Kosovo – 1389 – Ottoman wars in Europe
- Battle of Kosovo (1448) – Ottoman wars in Europe
- Battle of Kosovo (1915) – World War I
- Battle of Kota Bharu - 1941 - malayan campaign
- Battle of Krasos – 804 – Arab–Byzantine wars
- Battle of Krbava Field – 1493 – Hundred Years' Croatian–Ottoman War
- Battles of Krithia – 1915 – World War I – Gallipoli Campaign
  - First Battle of Krithia
  - Second Battle of Krithia
  - Third Battle of Krithia
  - Battle of Krithia Vineyard
- Battle of Kunyang – 24 – Rise of the Eastern Han
- Battle of Kursk – 1943 – World War II
- Siege of Kut – 1915–16 – World War I
- Battle of Kwajalein – 1944 – World War II
- Battle of Kyushu – 1281 – Mongol invasions of Japan
- Battle of Kyiv – 2022 – Russian Invasion of Ukraine

== L ==
- Battle of La Bicocca – 1522 – Italian War of 1521–1526
- Battle of Lade – 494 BC – Ionian Revolt
- Battle of La Hogue – 1692 – Nine Years' War
- Battle of Lake Erie – 1813 – War of 1812
- Battle of Lalakaon – 863 – Arab–Byzantine wars
- Battle of Laon – 1814 – Napoleonic Wars
- Battle of Largs – 1263 – Scottish–Norwegian War
- Battle of Lauffeld (in Belgium) – War of the Austrian Succession
- Battle of Le Cateau – 1914 – World War I
- Battle of Lechfeld – 955 – German states stop the gyaster
- Battle of Legnano – 1176 – Wars of the Guelphs and Ghibellines
- Battle of Leipzig – 1813 – Napoleonic Wars
- Battle of Lens – 1648 – Thirty Years' War
- First Battle of Lepanto – 1499 – Ottoman–Venetian War (1499–1503)
- Second Battle of Lepanto – 1500 – a second battle at the same place during the Ottoman–Venetian War
- Battle of Lepanto – 1571 – a third battle at Lepanto, during the Ottoman–Venetian War (1570–73)
- Battle of Lesnaya – 1708 – Great Northern War
- Battle of Leuthen – 1757 – Seven Years' War
- Battle of Leuven (891)
- Battle of Lewes – 1264 – Second Barons' War of England
- Battles of Lexington and Concord – 1775 – American War of Independence
- Battle of Leyte (land battle) – 1944 – World War II
- Battle of Leyte Gulf (sea battle) – 1944 – World War II
- Battle of Liaoyang – 1904 – Russo-Japanese War
- Battle of Ligny – 1815 – War of the Seventh Coalition
- Battle of Lincoln (1141) – 2 February 1141 – Stephen of England vs Matilda, England.
- Battle of Lincoln (1217) – 20 May 1217 – First Barons' War of England.
- Battle of Lipany (a.k.a. Cesky´-Brod or Böhmisch-Brod) – 1434 – Hussite Wars
- Battle of Lisnagarvey – 1649 – Cromwellian Wars
- Battle of Lissa – 1866 – Austro-Prussian War
- Battle of Littleferry – April 15, 1746 – Jacobite rising of 1745
- Battle of the Little Bighorn – 1876 – Great Sioux War of 1876
- Battle of Łódź – 1914 – World War I
- Battle of Lone Pine – 1915 – World War I – Gallipoli Campaign
- Battle of Long Island (a.k.a. Battle of Brooklyn) – 1776 – American Revolutionary War
- Battle of Long Jawai - 1963 - Indonesia–Malaysia confrontation
- Battle of Longewala – 1971 – Indo-Pakistani War of 1971
- Battle of Loos (see Battle of Artois-Loos)
- Battle of Lostwithiel (two connected battles) – 1642 and 1644 – English Civil War
- Battle of Lowestoft – 1665 – Second Anglo-Dutch War
- Battle of Łowicz – 1656 – The Deluge
- Battle of Lugou Bridge (a.k.a. Incident at Marco Polo Bridge) – 1937 – Second Sino-Japanese War
- Battle of Lumphanan – 1057 – Scottish dispute over the throne; Macbeth died here.
- Battle of Lundy's Lane – 1814 – War of 1812
- Battle of Lutetia – 52 BC – Gallic Wars
- Battle of Lutter – 1626 – Thirty Years' War
- Battle of Lützen (1632) – Thirty Years' War
- Battle of Lützen (1813) – Napoleonic Wars

== M ==
- Battle of Mabitac – 1900 – Philippine–American War
- Battle of Mactan – 1521 – Spanish Conquest of The Philippines
- Battle of Madagascar – 1942 – World War II
- Battle of Magdeburg – 1631 – Thirty Years' War
- Battle of Magdhaba – 1916 – World War I
- Battle of Magenta – 1859 – Italian Independence War
- Battle of Magersfontein – 1899 – Second Boer War
- Battle of Magh Tuiredh (two battles) – Irish mythology – see also Tuatha Dé Danann, Lugh
- Battle of Maiwand – 1880 – Second Anglo-Afghan War
- Battle of Majuba Hill – 1881 – First Boer War
- Battle of Makahambus Hill – 1900 – Philippine–American War
- Battle of Malakoff – 1855 – Crimean War
- Battle of Maldon – 991
- Battle of Malplaquet – 1709 – War of the Spanish Succession
- Battle of Manila (1574) – Spanish Conquest of The Philippines
- Battle of Manila (1762) – Seven Years' War
- Battle of Manila (1898) – Spanish–American War
- Battle of Manila (1899) – Philippine–American War
- Battle of Manila (1945) – World War II
- Battle of Manila Bay – 1898 – Spanish–American War
- Battle of Manners Street – 1943 World War II
- Battle of Mantinea (418 BC) – 418 BC – Peloponnesian War
- Battle of Mantinea (362 BC) – 362 BC
- Battle of Manzikert – 1071 – Byzantine–Seljuq wars
- Battle of Marathon – 490 BC – Greco-Persian Wars
- Battle of Marawi – 2017 - Moro conflict
- Battle of Marengo – 1800 – Napoleonic Wars
- Battle of Margate – 1387 – Hundred Years' War
- Battle of Marignano – 1515 – War of the League of Cambrai
- Battle of Marilao River – 1899 – Philippine–American War
- Operation Market Garden (Battle of Arnhem) – 1944 – World War II
- Battle of Markada - 2014 - Inter-rebel conflict during the Syrian Civil War
- First Battle of the Marne – 1914 – World War I
- Second Battle of the Marne – 1918 – World War I
- Battle of Marrakech – 1908
- Battle of Marston Moor – 1644 – First English Civil War
- First Battle of the Masurian Lakes – September 1914 – World War I
- Second Battle of the Masurian Lakes – February 1915 – World War I
- Battle of Măcin – 1791 – Russo-Turkish War (1787–92)
- Battle of Mauropotamos – Arab–Byzantine wars
- Battle of Mecca – 1813 – Ottoman–Saudi War
- Battle of Medellín – 1809 – Napoleonic Wars
- Battle of Medina (1812) – 1812 – Ottoman–Saudi War
- Battle of Meelick Island – 1650 – Cromwellian Wars
- Battle of Mello – 1358 – Peasant Jacquerie
- Battle of Megiddo (15th century BC) – Egyptian–Canaanite War
- Battle of Megiddo (609 BC) – 609 BC
- Battle of Megiddo (1918) – 1918 – World War I
- Battle of Mergentheim – 1645 – Thirty Years' War
- Battle of Meloria (1241) – Frederick II and Pisa vs. Genoa
- Battle of Meloria (1284) – Pisa vs. Genoa
- Battle of Mhlatuze River – Zulu Civil War
- Battle of Miani – 1843 – Anglo-Baluchi War
- Battle of Midway – 1942 – World War II
- Battle of the Milvian Bridge – 312 – Civil wars of the Tetrarchy
- Battle of Minatogawa – 1336 – Nanboku-chō Wars
- Battle of Mindanao – 1945 – World War II
- Battle of Mindoro – 1944 – World War II
- Battle of Minden – 1759 – Seven Years' War
- Battle of Mirbat – 1972 – [Oman Coup]
- Battle of Mobile (1781) – American Revolutionary War
- Battle of Mobile Bay – 1864 – American Civil War
- Battle of Modder River – 1899 – Second Boer War
- Battle of Möerskirch – 1800 – French Revolutionary Wars
- Battle of Mogadishu (1993) – Operation Gothic Serpent
- Battle of Mohács – 1526 – Ottoman–Hungarian Wars
- Battle of Mollwitz – 1741 – War of the Austrian Succession
- Battle of Monmouth – 1778 – American Revolutionary War
- Battle of Monocacy – 1864 – American Civil War
- Battle of the Monongahela – 1755 – French and Indian War
- Battle of Mons – 1914 – World War I
- Battle of Mons Badonicus – about 500 – Anglo-Saxon invasion of Britain
- Battle of Mons Graupius – 84 – Roman conquest of Britain
- Battle of Monte Cassino – 1944 – Italian Campaign (World War II)
- Battle of Montereau – 1814 – Napoleonic Wars
- Battle of Montmirail – 1814 – Napoleonic Wars
- Battle of Mormant – 1814 – Napoleonic Wars
- Battle of Moscow – 1941 – World War II
- Battle of Mouquet Farm – 1916
- Battle of Muhi (or Mohi) - 1241
- Battle of Mühlberg – 1547 – Schmalkaldic War
- Battle of Mycale – 479 BC – Greco-Persian Wars
- Battle of Myriokephalon – 1176 – Byzantine–Seljuq wars

== N ==
- Battle of Naissus – 269 – Crisis of the Third Century
- Night Attack at Târgoviște – 1462 – Vlad the Impaler versus Mehmed the Conqueror
- Battle of Nanking – 1937 – Second Sino-Japanese War
- Second Battle of Nanning – 1930 – Yunnan Army invasion
- Battle of Nanos – 1942 – World War II
- Battle of the Narmada – 619 – Conquests of Harshavardhana
- Battle of Naseby – 1645 – English Civil War
- Battle of Nashville – 1864 – American Civil War
- Battle of Naupactus – 429 BC – Peloponnesian War
- Battle of Navarino – 1827 – Greek War of Independence
- Battle of Las Navas de Tolosa – 1212 – Reconquista
- Battle of Nechtansmere – 685 – see Battle of Dun Nechtain
- Battle of Neerwinden (1693) – Nine Years' War
- Battles of Nejd – 1817 – 1818 – Wahhabi War
- Battle of the Nek – 1915 – World War I Gallipoli campaign
- Battle of Neresheim – 1796 – French Revolutionary Wars
- Battle of Nesjar – 1016 – Saint Olav Haraldsson
- Battle of Neuwied (1797) – French Revolutionary Wars
- Battle of New Orleans – 1815 – War of 1812
- Battle of New Ross (1798) – Irish Rebellion of 1798
- Battle of Nicopolis – 1396 – Ottoman wars in Europe
- Battle of Nikiou – 646 – Arab–Byzantine wars
- Battle of the Nile – 1798 – French Revolutionary Wars
- Battle of Nineveh (612 BC) – Fall of Assyria
- Battle of Nineveh (627) – Byzantine–Sasanian wars
- Battle of Nipe Bay – 1898 – Spanish-American War
- Battle of Niquitao – 1813 – Venezuelan War of Independence
- Battle of Nördlingen (1634) – Thirty Years' War
- Battle of Nördlingen (1645) – Thirty Years' War
- Battle of Normandy – 1944 – World War II
- Battle of Noryang – 1598 – Japanese invasions of Korea (1592–1598)
- Battle of Novara (1513) – War of the League of Cambrai
- Battle of Novara (1849) – Italian Independence wars
- Battle of Novi (1799) – French Revolutionary Wars

== O ==
- Battle of Ocaña – 1809 – Napoleonic Wars
- Battle of Oenophyta – 457 BC – First Peloponnesian War
- Battle of Okinawa – 1945 – World War II
- Battle of Olongapo – 1899 - Philippine–American War
- Battle of Olpae – 426 BC – Peloponnesian War
- Battle of Omdurman – 1898 – Mahdist War
- Battle of Orchomenus – 84 BC – First Mithridatic War
- Battle of Orléans – 1429 – Hundred Years' War – Joan of Arc participated
- Battle of Otterburn – 1388 – Scottish/English border dispute
- Battle of Oudenarde – 1708 – War of the Spanish Succession
- Battle of Ourique – 1139 – Reconquista

== P ==
- Battle of Paardeberg – 1900 – Second Boer War
- Battle of Pákozd – 1848 – Hungarian Revolution of 1848
- Battle of Panipat (1526) – Mughal - Delhi Sultanate War
- Battle of Panipat (1556) – Mughal–Afghan Wars
- Battle of Panipat (1761) – Afghan–Maratha Wars
- Battle of Parwan – 1221 – Mongol invasion of the Khwarazmian Empire
- Battle of the Paracel Islands – 1974 – Vietnam War
- Battle of Passchendaele – 1917 – World War I
- Battle of Patay – 1429 – Hundred Years' War
- Battle of Pavia (271) – Crisis of the Third Century
- Siege of Pavia (773–74) – Conquests of Charlemagne
- Battle of Pavia (1431) – Wars in Lombardy
- Battle of Pavia – 1525 – Italian War of 1521–26
- Battle of Paye – 1899 – Philippine–American War
- Battle of Peking (1900) – Boxer Rebellion
- Battle of Peleliu – 1944 – World War II
- Attack on Pearl Harbor – 1941 – World War II
- Sieges of Petra, Lazica – 6th century AD – Byzantine-Sasanian wars
- Battle of Pharsalus – 48 BC – Caesar's Civil War
- Battle of Philippi – 42 BC (in Macedonia) – Liberators' civil war
- Battle of Philippi (West Virginia) – (1861) – American Civil War
- Battle of the Philippine Sea – 1944 – World War II
- Battle of the Plains of Abraham – 1759 – Seven Years' War
- Siege of Pilsen – 1618 – Thirty Years' War
- Battle of Pine Creek - 1858 - Yakima War
- Battle of Pinkie – 1547 – Rough Wooing, England v. Scotland
- Battle of Placentia (271)
- Battle of Plassey - 1757
- Battle of Plataea – 479 BC – Greco-Persian Wars
- Battle of Plaman Mapu - 1965 - Indonesia-Malaysia Confrontation
- Battle of Pliska – Byzantine–Bulgarian wars
- Battle of Poitiers – 1356 – Hundred Years' War
- Battle of Poljana – 1945 – World War II
- Battle of Pollentia – 402 – Goth invasion of the Western Roman Empire
- Battle of Poltava – 1709 – Great Northern War
- Battle of Port Arthur – 1904 – Russo-Japanese War
- Battle of Portland – 1653 – First Anglo-Dutch War
- Battle of Portland Harbor – 1863 – American Civil War
- Battle of Portomaggiore – 1395 – Italy
- Battle of Pozoblanco – 1937 – Spanish Civil War
- Battle of Pozzolo – 1800 – French Revolutionary Wars
- Battle of Prague (1648) – Thirty Years' War
- Battle of Prague (1757) – Seven Years' War
- Battle of Pressburg (907) [Pozsony or Bratislava]-Hungarian conquest of the Carpathian Basin
- Battle of Preston (1648) – Second English Civil War
- Battle of Preston (1715) – Jacobite rising of 1715
- Battle of Prestonpans – 1745 – Jacobite rising of 1745
- Battle of Princeton – 1777 – American Revolutionary War
- Battle of Pteria – 547 BC – Greco-Persian Wars
- Siege of Puebla (1847) – Mexican–American War
- Battle of Puebla – 1862 – French intervention in Mexico
- Battle of Puente Sanpayo – 1862 – Peninsular War
- Battle of Pydna – 168 BC – Third Macedonian War
- Battle of Pylos – 425 BC – Peloponnesian War

== Q ==
- Battle of Qarawal – 1764 – Afghan–Sikh Wars
- Battle of Quatre Bras – 1815 – War of the Seventh Coalition
- Battle of Quebec (1690) – British attack during King William's War
- Battle of Quebec (1759) – Seven Years' War, includes the Battle of the Plains of Abraham.
- Battle of Quebec (1760) – Seven Years' War
- Battle of Quebec (1775) – American Revolutionary War
- Battle of Queenston Heights – 1812 – War of 1812
- Battle of Quingua – 1899 – Philippine–American War

== R ==
- Battle of Raab – 1809 – Napoleonic Wars
- Battle of Rafa – 1917 – World War I
- Battle of Rain – 1632 – Thirty Years' War
- Battle of Rakvere – 1268
- Battle of Ramillies – 1706 – War of the Spanish Succession
- Battle of Ramoth-Gilead – 953 BC – Israeli–Syrian War
- Battle of Rastatt (1796) – French Revolutionary Wars
- Battle of Raszyn (1809) – Napoleonic Wars
- Battle of Raucoux (1746) (in Belgium) – War of the Austrian Succession
- Battle of Ravenna (432) – Bonifacius vs. Flavius Aëtius
- Battle of Ravenna (1512) – War of the League of Cambrai
- Battle of Reading – 871 – Ethelred of Wessex and Alfred the Great defeated by a Danish army
- Battle of Reading – 1688 – Glorious Revolution
- Battle of Red Cliffs – 208 – Rise of the Three Kingdoms
- Battle of Remagen – 1945 – World War II
- Battle of Rheinfelden – 1638 – Thirty Years' War
- Second Battle of Rivas – 1856 – Central American coalition defeats filibuster William Walker
- Battle of the River Plate – 1939 – World War II
- Battle of Rivoli – 1796 – French Revolutionary Wars
- Battle of Rocroi – 1643 – Thirty Years' War
- Battle of Romani – 1916 – World War I
- Battle for Rome – 1944 – Italian Campaign (World War II)
- Battle of Rorke's Drift – 1879 – Anglo-Zulu War
- Battle of Rossbach – 1757 – Seven Years' War
- Battle of Roundway Down – 1643 – First English Civil War
- Battle of Rozgony - 1312
- Battle of Ruvo – 1503 – Italian War of 1499–1504

== S ==
- Battle of San Lorenzo de la Muga – 1794 – French Revolutionary Wars
- Battle of San Francisco de Malabon – 1896 – Philippine Revolution
- Battle of Saint-Omer – 1340 – Hundred Years' War
- Battle of St Pol de Léon – 1346 – War of the Breton Succession
- Battle of St. Quentin (1914) – World War I
- Battle of Sablat – 1619 – Thirty Years' War
- Battle of Saigon (1968) – Vietnam War
- Battle of Sainte-Foy – 1760 – Seven Years' War
- Battle of Saipan – 1944 – World War II
- Battle of Salamanca – 1812 – Napoleonic Wars
- Battle of Salamis – 480 BC – Greco-Persian Wars
- Battle of Salamis (in Cyprus) – 450 BC – pre-Peloponnesian War
- Battle of San Jacinto – 1836 – Texas Revolution
- Battle of Santa Rosa – 1856 – Costa Rican troops rout Walker's soldiers
- Battle of Santiago de Cuba – 1898 – Spanish–American War
- Battles of Saratoga – 1777 – American Revolutionary War
- Battle of Sarhū – 1619 – Transition from Ming to Qing
- Battle of Sari Bair – 1915 – World War I – Gallipoli Campaign
- Battle of Sarmada – 1119 – Crusader-Turkish Wars
- Battle of Scheveningen – 1653 – First Anglo-Dutch War
- Battle of Schwechat – 1848 – Hungarian Revolution of 1848
- Battle of Schwetz – see Battle of Świecino
- Battle of Scimitar Hill – 1915 – World War I – Gallipoli Campaign
- Battle of Sedan (1870) – Franco-Prussian War
- Battle of Sedgemoor – 1685 – Monmouth Rebellion
- Battle of Sekigahara – 1600 – Re-unification of Japan and rise of the Tokugawa shogunate
- Battle of Sempach – 1386 – Growth of the Old Swiss Confederacy
- Battle of Seneffe – 1674 – Franco-Dutch War
- Siege of Sevastopol – 1854-5 – Crimean War
- Battle of Shanhai Pass – 1644 – Manchu conquest of China
- Battle of Shanghai – 1937 – Second Sino-Japanese War
- Battle of Shen-Liao – 1621 – Qing conquest of the Ming
- Battle of Shijōnawate – 1348 – Nanboku-chō period
- Battle of Shiloh – 1862 – American Civil War
- Battle of Sheriffmuir – 1715 – Jacobite rising of 1715
- Battle of Shrewsbury – 1403 – Percy Revolt against Henry IV
- Battle of Shujabad – 1780 – Afghan–Sikh Wars
- Battle of Sitka – 1804 – Russian colonization of the Americas
- Battle of Skibo and Strathfleet – 1480 – Scottish clan battle
- Battle of Sluis (1603) – Eighty Years' War
- Battle of Sluys – 1340 – Hundred Years' War
- Battle of Smolensk – 1943 – World War II
- Battle of Solferino – 1859 – Second Italian War of Independence
- Battle of the Somme – 1916 – World War I
- Battle of the Somme (1918) – World War I
- Battle of Sphacteria – 425 BC – Peloponnesian War
- Battle of Spion Kop – 1900 – Second Boer War
- Battle of Spotsylvania Court House – 1864 – American Civil War
- Battle of Stadtlohn – 1623 – Thirty Years' War
- Battle of Stalingrad – 1942 – World War II
- Battle of Stamford Bridge – 1066 – Viking invasion of England
- First Battle of St Albans – 1455 – Wars of the Roses
- Second Battle of St Albans – 1461 – Wars of the Roses
- First Battle of Saint-Dizier – 1814 – Napoleonic Wars
- Second Battle of Saint-Dizier – 1814 – Napoleonic Wars
- Battle of Saint Gotthard – 1664 – Ottoman wars in Europe
- Battle of Steenkerque – 1692 – Nine Years' War
- Battle of Stiklestad – 1030 – Christianization of Norway
- Battle of Stirling Bridge – 1297 – First War of Scottish Independence
- Battle of Stirling (1648) – Wars of the Three Kingdoms
- Battle of Stoke Field – 1487 – Wars of the Roses
- Battle of Stockach (1800) – French Revolutionary Wars
- Siege of Stralsund (1628) – Thirty Years' War
- Siege of Stralsund (1711–15) – Great Northern War
- First Battle of the Stronghold – 1873 – Modoc War
- Battle of Stångebro – 1598 – War against Sigismund
- Battle of Suiyang – 757 – An Lushan rebellion
- Battle of Surat – 1664 – Imperial Maratha Conquests
- Battle of Surajgarh – 1534 – Sher Shah Sur's Campaigns
- Battle of Sutlej – 1765 – Afghan–Sikh Wars
- Battle of Svistov – 1877 – Russo-Turkish War (1877–78)
- Battle of Świecino (a.k.a. Schwetz, Żarnowiec) – 1462 – Thirteen Years' War
- Battle of Syracuse (415 BC) – Peloponnesian War
- Siege of Syracuse (397 BC) – Greek–Punic Wars

== T ==
- Battle of Tagliacozzo – 1268
- Battle of Taierzhuang – 1938 – Second Sino-Japanese War
- Battle of Taku Forts – 1900 – Boxer Rebellion
- Battle of Talas – 751 – Muslim conquest of Transoxiana
- Battle of Talavera – 1809 – Napoleonic Wars
- Battle of Tanagra (457 BC) – Peloponnesian War
- Battle of Tannenberg (1410) – Polish–Lithuanian–Teutonic War
- Battle of Tannenberg – 1914 – World War I
- Battle of Tarawa (a.k.a. Tarawa-Makin) – 1943 – World War II
- Battle of Tarifa – 1340 – during the Reconquista
- Battle of Tarvisio – 1943 – World War II
- Battle of Tassafaronga – 1942 – World War II
- Battle of Tashkessen – 1877 – Russo-Turkish War (1877–1878)
- Battle of Teruel – 1937 – Spanish Civil War (1936–1939)
- Battle of Tchernaïa – 1855 – Crimean War
- Battle of Temesvár -1849
- Fall of Tenochtitlan – 1521 – Spanish conquest of the Aztec Empire
- Battle of the Teutoburg Forest – 9 – Germanic Wars
- Battle of Tewkesbury – 1471 – Wars of the Roses
- Battle of Texel – 1673 – Franco-Dutch and Third Anglo-Dutch Wars
- Battle of the Thames – 1813 – War of 1812
- Battle of Thapsus – 46 BC – Caesar's Civil War
- Battle of Thermopylae – 480 BC – Greco-Persian Wars
- Battle of Ticonderoga (1758) – French and Indian War
- Battle of Ticonderoga (1759) – French and Indian War
- Battle of Ticonderoga (1775) – American Revolutionary War
- Siege of Fort Ticonderoga (1777) – American Revolutionary War
- First Battle of Tikrit – 2014 – Iraqi Civil War (2014–2017)
- Second Battle of Tikrit – 2015 – Iraqi Civil War (2014–2017)
- Battle of Tippecanoe – 1811 – Tecumseh's War
- Battle of Tippermuir – 1644 – Wars of the Three Kingdoms
- Battle of Tirad Pass – 1899 – Philippine–American War
- Siege of Tobruk – 1941 – World War II
- Battle of Tolentino – 1815 – War of the Seventh Coalition
- Battle of Tololing – 1999 – Kargil War
- Battle of Torran Dubh – 1517 – Scottish clan battle
- Battle of Toulon – 1707 – War of the Spanish Succession
- Battle of Toulon – 1744 – War of the Austrian Succession
- Siege of Toulon – 1793 – French Revolutionary Wars
- Battle of Toulouse – 721 – Islamic invasion of Gaul
- Battle of Toulouse – 1814 – Napoleonic Wars
- Battle of Tourcoing – 1794 – French Revolutionary Wars
- Battle of Tours – 732 – Islamic invasion of Gaul
- Battle of Towton – 1461 – Wars of the Roses
- Battle of Trafalgar – 1805 – Napoleonic Wars
- Battle of Trebbia (1799) – French Revolutionary Wars
- Battle of Trenton – 1776 – American Revolutionary War
- Second Battle of Trenton – 1777 – American Revolutionary War
- Battle of Triangle Hill – 1952 – Korean War
- Battle of Trippstadt – 1794 – French Revolutionary Wars
- Battle of Troy – 1194 BC – Trojan War
- Battle of Tsushima – 1905 – Russo-Japanese War
- Battle of Tudela – 1808 – Napoleonic Wars
- Battle of Tuiteam Tarbhach – 1406? – Scottish clan battle
- Battle of Turckheim – 1675 – Franco-Dutch War
- Battle of Tumu Fortress/Castle – 1449 – Ming wars against the Mongols
- Battle of Tunisia – 1942 – World War II
- Battle of Turnham Green – 1642 – English Civil War
- Battle of Tuttlingen – 1643 – Thirty Years' War
- Battle of Tetovo – 2001 – 2001 insurgency in Macedonia

== U ==
- Battle of Uclés (1108) – Reconquista
- Battle of Uclés (1809) – Peninsular War in the Napoleonic Wars
- Battle of Ulm – 1805 – War of the Third Coalition
- Battle of Ulundi – 1879 – Anglo-Zulu War
- Battle of Unsan – 1950 – Korean War
- Battle of Uji – 1180 – Genpei War
- Battle of Ürümqi (1933) - Kumul Rebellion
- Battle of Ürümqi (1933–34) - Kumul Rebellion
- Battle of Ushant – 1778 – American Revolutionary War

== V ==
- Battle of Vaila – see Battle of Agnadello
- Battle of Valenciennes – 1656 – Thirty Years' War (Spanish-French Extension)
- Battle of Valley Forge (1777–1778)
- Battle of Valmy – 1792 – French Revolutionary Wars
- Battle of Valsequillo – 1936 – Spanish Civil War
- Battle of Varey – 1325 – Dauphiné-Savoy disputes
- Battle of Vaslui – 1475 – (Moldavian–Ottoman Wars)
- Battle of Vauchamps – 1814 – Napoleonic Wars
- Siege of Veracruz – 1847 – Mexican–American War
- Battle of Veracruz – 1914 – see United States occupation of Veracruz
- Battle of Verdun – 1916 – World War I
- Battle of Vimeiro – 1808 – Napoleonic Wars
- Battle of Vimy Ridge – 1917 – World War I
- Battle of Vinegar Hill – 1798 – Irish Rebellion of 1798
- Battle of Vitoria – 1813 – Napoleonic Wars
- Battle of the Visayas – 1945 – World War II
- Battle of Vukovar – 1991 – Croatian War of Independence
- Siege of Vicksburg – 1863 – American Civil War

== W ==
- Battle of Wagram – 1809 – Napoleonic Wars
- Battle of Wakefield – 1460 – Wars of the Roses
- Battle of Warsaw (1656) – Northern Wars
- Battle of Warsaw (1831) – Polish revolt against Russia
- Battle of Vistula Lagoon – 1463 – Thirteen Years' War
- Battle of Warsaw (1920) – Polish–Soviet War
- Siege of Warsaw (1939) – World War II
- Warsaw Uprising – 1944 – World War II
- Battle of Washita River – 1868 – the American Indian Wars
- Battle of Waterloo – 1815 – War of the Seventh Coalition
- Battle of Wattignies – 1793 – French Revolutionary Wars
- Battle of Wau – 1942 – World War II
- Battle of Wavre – 1815 – War of the Seventh Coalition
- Battle of Wayna Daga – 1543 – Abyssinian–Adal war and Ottoman–Portuguese conflicts (1538–57)
- Battle of Werben – 1631 – Thirty Years' War
- Battle of Westerplatte – 1939 – World War II
- Battle of Wevelinghoven – 1648 – Thirty Years' War
- Battle of White Mountain – 1620 – Thirty Years' War
- Battle of Wiesloch – 1622 – Thirty Years' War
- Battle of the Wilderness – 1864 – American Civil War
- Battle of Wimpfen – 1622 – Thirty Years' War
- Battle of Wittstock – 1636 – Thirty Years' War
- Battle of Wœrth (1793) – French Revolutionary Wars
- Battle of Wogastisburg – 631
- Battle of Wolgast – 1628 – Thirty Years' War
- Battle of Worcester – 1651 – English Civil War
- Battle of Worringen – 1288 – War of the Limburg Succession
- Battle of Wounded Knee – 1890 – Sioux Wars
- Battle of Wuzhang Plains – 234 – fought between Shu Han and Cao Wei during the Three Kingdoms period of China

== X ==
- Battle of Xiangyang (191 AD) – End of the Han Dynasty
- Battle of Xiangyang (1268–1273) – Yuan conquest of Southern Song
- Battle of Xinzheng – (1930) – Central Plains War

== Y ==
- Battle of Yalu River (1894) – First Sino-Japanese War
- Battle of Yalu River (1904) – Russo-Japanese War
- Battle of Yarmuk – 636 – Byzantine-Arab Wars
- Battle of Yarmouk Camp - 2015 - Syrian Civil War
- Battle of York – 1813 – War of 1812
- Battle of Yorktown (1781) – American Revolutionary War
- First Battle of Ypres – 1914 – World War I
- Second Battle of Ypres – 1915 – World War I
- Third Battle of Ypres – 1917 – World War I

== Z ==
- Battle of Žalgiris – see Battle of Grunwald (1410)
- Battle of Zama – 202 BC – Second Punic War
- Battle of Żarnowiec – see Battle of Świecino
- Battle of Zapote Bridge (1897) – Philippine Revolution
- Battle of Zenta – 1697 – Great Turkish War
- Battle of Zborov – 1917 – World War I
- Battle of Zhongli – 507 – Northern and Southern dynasties
- First Battle of Zurich – 1799 – Wars of the French Revolution
- Second Battle of Zurich – 1799 – Wars of the French Revolution
- Battle of Zusmarshausen – 1648 – Thirty Years' War
