= Hahausen =

Place in Lower Saxony, Germany

- Ortschaft of Langelsheim
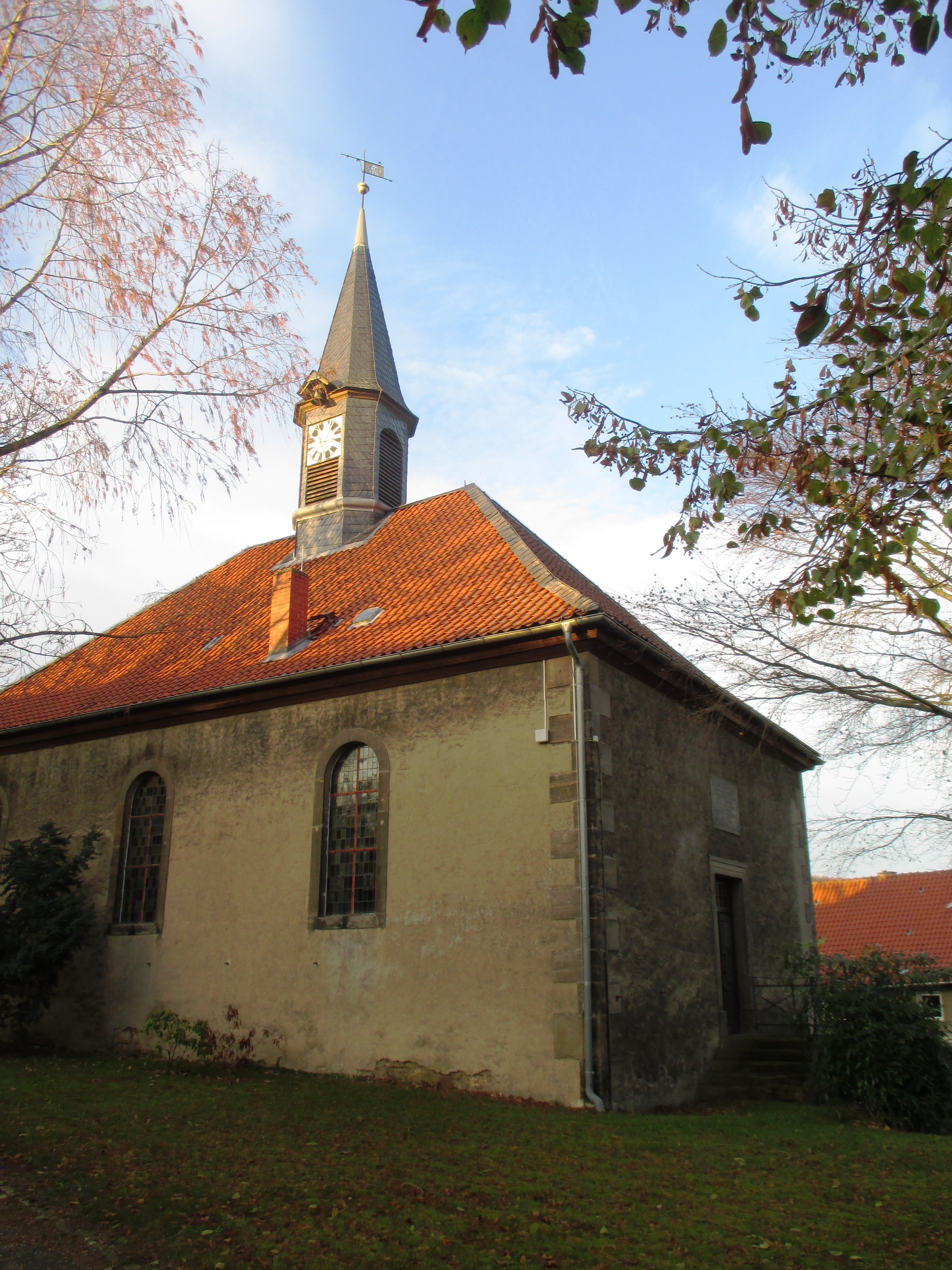
- Church in Hahausen

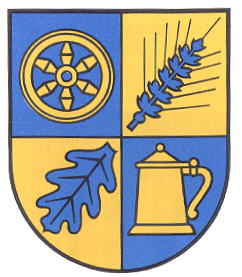
- Coat of arms
- Interactive map of Hahausen
- Location within Germany Location within Lower Saxony
- Coordinates: 51°57′00″N 10°13′03″E
- Country: Germany
- State: Lower Saxony
- District: Goslar
- Town: Langelsheim

Area
  - Total: 9.65 km^{2} (3.73 sq mi)
- Elevation: 210 m (690 ft)

Population (2020)
  - Total: 765
  - Density: 79.3/km^{2} (205/sq mi)
- Time zone: UTC+01:00 (CET)
  - Summer (DST): UTC+02:00 (CEST)
- Postal codes: 38729
- Dialling codes: 05383
- Vehicle registration: GS
- Website: www.hahausen.de

Hahausen is a village and a former municipality in the district of Goslar in Lower Saxony, Germany. Since 1 November 2021, it is part of the town Langelsheim, of which it is an Ortschaft.

It is situated northwest of the Harz mountains, between Seesen and Lutter am Barenberge. It was part of the former Samtgemeinde ("collective municipality") Lutter am Barenberge.

== Geography ==
=== City districts ===
- Hahausen
- Neuekrug

== History ==
=== Demographics ===
As of 30 June 2020 there were 765 inhabitants in Hahausen.

Population statistics

Year	Inhabitants
1821	425
1848	639
1871	784
1885	890
1905	869
1925	852

Year	Inhabitants
1933	849
1939	821
1946	1,545
1950	1,584
1956	1,265

Year	Inhabitants
1961	1,102
1968	1,066
1970	1,050
1975	957
1980	950

Year	Inhabitants
1985	982
1990	928
1995	983
2000	973
2005	930
