= Markus Paschke =

German politician

Member of the Bundestag; from Lower Saxony
- In office 4 November 2019 – 26 October 2021
- Preceded by: Sigmar Gabriel
- Succeeded by: Dunja Kreiser
- Constituency: Salzgitter – Wolfenbüttel
- In office 22 October 2013 – 24 October 2017
- Constituency: State list

Personal details
- Born: Markus Alfred Josef Paschke; 8 June 1963 (age 63) Bremen, West Germany
- Party: Social Democratic

Markus Paschke (born 8 June 1963) is a German politician of the Social Democratic Party (SPD) who has served as a member of the Bundestag from the state of Lower Saxony from 2013 till 2017 and again from 2019 to October 2021.

== Political career ==
On 4 November 2019 Paschke succeeded Sigmar Gabriel who had resigned his seat in the Bundestag. In parliament, he has since been serving is a member of the Committee for Education, Research and Technology Assessment.
