= Battle of Changsha =

Battle of Changsha may refer to:

== Battles ==
- Battle of Changsha (1852), part of the Taiping Rebellion
- Battle of Changsha (1911), part of the Xinhai Revolution
- Battle of Changsha (1939), in the Second Sino-Japanese War
- Battle of Changsha (1941), in the Second Sino-Japanese War
- Battle of Changsha (1941–1942), in the Second Sino-Japanese War
- Battle of Changsha (1944), in the Second Sino-Japanese War

== Other uses ==
- Battle of Changsha (TV series), 2014
