= Salzgitter – Wolfenbüttel =

Federal electoral district of Germany

49 Salzgitter – Wolfenbüttel
- Electoral district for the Bundestag
- Salzgitter – Wolfenbüttel in 2025
- State: Lower Saxony
- Population: 266,200 (2019)
- Electorate: 200,922 (2021)
- Major settlements: Salzgitter; Wolfenbüttel
- Area: 1,238.4 km^{2}

Current electoral district
- Created: 1949
- Party: SPD
- Member: Dunja Kreiser
- Elected: 2021, 2025

Salzgitter – Wolfenbüttel is an electoral constituency (German: Wahlkreis) represented in the Bundestag. It elects one member via first-past-the-post voting. Under the current constituency numbering system, it is designated as constituency 49. It is located in southeastern Lower Saxony, comprising the city of Salzgitter, the district of Wolfenbüttel, and northern parts of the district of Goslar.

Salzgitter – Wolfenbüttel was created for the inaugural 1949 federal election. Since 2021, it has been represented by Dunja Kreiser of the Social Democratic Party (SPD).

== Geography ==
Salzgitter – Wolfenbüttel is located in southeastern Lower Saxony. As of the 2021 federal election, it comprises the independent city of Salzgitter, the entirety of the district of Wolfenbüttel, and the Samtgemeinde of Lutter am Barenberge and municipalities of Langelsheim, Liebenburg, and Seesen from the district of Goslar.

== History ==
Salzgitter – Wolfenbüttel was created in 1949, then known as Gandersheim – Salzgitter. In the 1965 through 1976 elections, it was named Salzgitter. It acquired its current name in the 1980 election. In the inaugural Bundestag election, it was Lower Saxony constituency 27 in the numbering system. From 1953 through 1961, it was number 49. From 1965 through 1998, it was number 44. In the 2002 and 2005 elections, it was number 49. In the 2009 election, it was number 50. Since the 2013 election, it has been number 49.

Originally, the constituency comprised the independent city of Salzgitter, the district of Gandersheim, and the Samtgemeinde of Baddeckenstedt from the Wolfenbüttel district. In the 1980 through 1998 elections, it comprised the independent city of Salzgitter and district of Wolfenbüttel. It acquired its current borders in the 2002 election.

Election	No.	Name	Borders
1949	27	Gandersheim – Salzgitter	Salzgitter city; Gandersheim district; Wolfenbüttel district (only Baddeckenstedt Samtgemeinde)
1953	49	Gandersheim – Salzgitter	Salzgitter city; Gandersheim district; Wolfenbüttel district (only Baddeckenstedt Samtgemeinde)
1957	49	Gandersheim – Salzgitter	Salzgitter city; Gandersheim district; Wolfenbüttel district (only Baddeckenstedt Samtgemeinde)
1961	49	Gandersheim – Salzgitter	Salzgitter city; Gandersheim district; Wolfenbüttel district (only Baddeckenstedt Samtgemeinde)
1965	44	Salzgitter	Salzgitter city; Gandersheim district; Wolfenbüttel district (only Baddeckenstedt Samtgemeinde)
1969	44	Salzgitter	Salzgitter city; Gandersheim district; Wolfenbüttel district (only Baddeckenstedt Samtgemeinde)
1972	44	Salzgitter	Salzgitter city; Gandersheim district; Wolfenbüttel district (only Baddeckenstedt Samtgemeinde)
1976	44	Salzgitter	Salzgitter city; Gandersheim district; Wolfenbüttel district (only Baddeckenstedt Samtgemeinde)
1980	44	Salzgitter – Wolfenbüttel	Salzgitter city; Wolfenbüttel district
1983	44	Salzgitter – Wolfenbüttel	Salzgitter city; Wolfenbüttel district
1987	44	Salzgitter – Wolfenbüttel	Salzgitter city; Wolfenbüttel district
1990	44	Salzgitter – Wolfenbüttel	Salzgitter city; Wolfenbüttel district
1994	44	Salzgitter – Wolfenbüttel	Salzgitter city; Wolfenbüttel district
1998	44	Salzgitter – Wolfenbüttel	Salzgitter city; Wolfenbüttel district
2002	49	Salzgitter – Wolfenbüttel	Salzgitter city; Wolfenbüttel district; Goslar district (only Langelsheim, Liebenburg, and Seesen municipalities and Lutter am Barenberge Samtgemeinde)
2005	49	Salzgitter – Wolfenbüttel	Salzgitter city; Wolfenbüttel district; Goslar district (only Langelsheim, Liebenburg, and Seesen municipalities and Lutter am Barenberge Samtgemeinde)
2009	50	Salzgitter – Wolfenbüttel	Salzgitter city; Wolfenbüttel district; Goslar district (only Langelsheim, Liebenburg, and Seesen municipalities and Lutter am Barenberge Samtgemeinde)
2013	49	Salzgitter – Wolfenbüttel	Salzgitter city; Wolfenbüttel district; Goslar district (only Langelsheim, Liebenburg, and Seesen municipalities and Lutter am Barenberge Samtgemeinde)
2017	49	Salzgitter – Wolfenbüttel	Salzgitter city; Wolfenbüttel district; Goslar district (only Langelsheim, Liebenburg, and Seesen municipalities and Lutter am Barenberge Samtgemeinde)
2021	49	Salzgitter – Wolfenbüttel	Salzgitter city; Wolfenbüttel district; Goslar district (only Langelsheim, Liebenburg, and Seesen municipalities and Lutter am Barenberge Samtgemeinde)
2025	49	Salzgitter – Wolfenbüttel	Salzgitter city; Wolfenbüttel district; Goslar district (only Langelsheim, Liebenburg, and Seesen municipalities and Lutter am Barenberge Samtgemeinde)

== Members ==
The constituency has been held by the Social Democratic Party (SPD) during all but two Bundestag terms since 1949. Its first representative was Karl Bielig of the SPD, who served from 1949 to 1953. Wilhelm Höck of the Christian Democratic Union (CDU) won the constituency in 1953 and was re-elected in 1957. In 1961, Hans-Jürgen Junghans of the SPD was elected. He was succeeded in 1987 by Wilhelm Schmidt, who served until 2005. Sigmar Gabriel has served as representative since 2005; Gabriel served as Vice-Chancellor of Germany from 2013 to 2018. He was succeeded as representative by Dunja Kreiser in 2021.

Election	Member	Party	%
1949	Karl Bielig	SPD	35.2
1953	Wilhelm Höck	CDU	39.8
1957	Wilhelm Höck	CDU	48.3
1961	Hans-Jürgen Junghans	SPD	46.8
1965	Hans-Jürgen Junghans	SPD	48.3
1969	Hans-Jürgen Junghans	SPD	52.5
1972	Hans-Jürgen Junghans	SPD	59.0
1976	Hans-Jürgen Junghans	SPD	55.0
1980	Hans-Jürgen Junghans	SPD	54.2
1983	Hans-Jürgen Junghans	SPD	47.9
1987	Wilhelm Schmidt	SPD	49.2
1990	Wilhelm Schmidt	SPD	45.4
1994	Wilhelm Schmidt	SPD	49.9
1998	Wilhelm Schmidt	SPD	58.9
2002	Wilhelm Schmidt	SPD	56.8
2005	Sigmar Gabriel	SPD	52.3
2009	Sigmar Gabriel	SPD	44.9
2013	Sigmar Gabriel	SPD	46.6
2017	Sigmar Gabriel	SPD	42.8
2021	Dunja Kreiser	SPD	38.6
2025	Dunja Kreiser	SPD	30.6

== Election results ==
=== 2025 election ===
Federal election (20215): Salzgitter – Wolfenbüttel
Notes:	Blue background denotes the winner of the electorate vote. Pink background denotes a candidate elected from their party list. Yellow background denotes an electorate win by a list member, or other incumbent. A ✓ or ✗ denotes status of any incumbent, win or lose respectively.						
Party	Candidate	Votes	%	±%	Party votes	%	±%
SPD	✓ Dunja Kreiser	48,410	30.6	▼8.0	38,650	24.4	▼12.3
CDU	Reza Asghari	44,807	28.3	▲1.1	42,085	26.5	▲3.6
AfD	Angela Rudzka	33,787	21.3	▲11.5	33,836	21.2	▲11.4
Left	Cem Ince	11,139	7.0	▲3.1	12,357	7.8	▲4.7
Greens	Lena Krause	10,910	6.9	▼3.7	33,824	8.7	▼3.7
BSW					6,404	4.0	
FDP	Kevin Violence	3,934	2.5	▼4.1	5,619	3.5	▼5.7
FW	Jörg-Uwe Weber	2,291	1.4	▲0.3	1,129	0.7	▼0.2
Volt	Marie Lenke	1,596	1.0		816	0.5	▲0.3
Tierschutzpartei					2,024	1.3	▼0.2
dieBasis	Nina Ute	1,406	0.9	▼0.2	539	0.3	▼0.6
PARTEI					732	0.5	▼0.4
Pirates				▼0.8	267	0.2	▼0.2
BD					179	0.1	
Humanists					105	0.1	0.0
MLPD					31	0.0	0.0
Team Todenhöfer							▼0.5
ÖDP							▼0.1
Informal votes		1,324			1,007		
Total valid votes		158,280			158,597		
Turnout		159,604	81.8	▲8.5			
SPD hold	Majority	3,603	2.3				

=== 2021 election ===
Federal election (2021): Salzgitter – Wolfenbüttel
Notes:	Blue background denotes the winner of the electorate vote. Pink background denotes a candidate elected from their party list. Yellow background denotes an electorate win by a list member, or other incumbent. A ✓ or ✗ denotes status of any incumbent, win or lose respectively.						
Party	Candidate	Votes	%	±%	Party votes	%	±%
SPD	Dunja Kreiser	56,157	38.6	▼4.2	53,411	36.7	▲4.2
CDU	Holger Bormann	39,541	27.2	▼2.0	33,453	23.0	▼6.6
Greens	Claudia Bei der Wieden	15,353	10.6	▲6.3	18,105	12.4	▲5.9
AfD	Thomas Günther	14,331	9.9	▼2.1	14,415	9.9	▼2.4
FDP	Max Weitemeier	9,544	6.6	▲1.9	13,463	9.2	▲1.2
Left	Victor Perli	5,675	3.9	▼2.1	4,478	3.1	▼4.2
Tierschutzpartei					2,156	1.5	▲0.5
FW	Günter Karl-Heinz Gehmert	1,651	1.1		1,317	0.9	▲0.6
dieBasis	Volker Eyssen	1,599	1.1		1,362	0.9	
PARTEI					1,274	0.9	▼0.1
Team Todenhöfer					743	0.5	
Pirates	Jens Golland	1,220	0.8	0.0	598	0.4	0.0
Independent	Christiane Jagau	282	0.2				
Volt					260	0.2	
NPD					240	0.2	▼0.2
V-Partei3					100	0.1	0.0
Humanists					94	0.1	
ÖDP					86	0.1	0.0
du.					86	0.1	
Independent	Paul Deutsch	71	0.0				
LKR					39	0.0	
MLPD					23	0.0	0.0
DKP					19	0.0	0.0
Informal votes		1,794			1,496		
Total valid votes		145,424			145,722		
Turnout		147,218	73.3	▼2.9			
SPD hold	Majority	16,616	11.4	▼2.3			

=== 2017 election ===
Federal election (2017): Salzgitter – Wolfenbüttel
Notes:	Blue background denotes the winner of the electorate vote. Pink background denotes a candidate elected from their party list. Yellow background denotes an electorate win by a list member, or other incumbent. A ✓ or ✗ denotes status of any incumbent, win or lose respectively.						
Party	Candidate	Votes	%	±%	Party votes	%	±%
SPD	✓ Sigmar Gabriel	66,587	42.8	▼3.8	50,482	32.4	▼6.8
CDU	Uwe Lagosky	45,310	29.1	▼7.9	45,985	29.5	▼6.2
AfD	Manfred Wolfrum	18,564	11.9	▲8.9	19,115	12.3	▲8.2
Left	Victor Perli	9,290	6.0	▲1.6	11,266	7.2	▲1.6
FDP	Jens Henry Neubert	7,268	4.7	▲3.6	12,450	8.0	▲4.6
Greens	Ghali El Boustami	6,680	4.3	▼0.1	10,213	6.6	▼0.8
Tierschutzpartei					1,591	1.0	▲0.2
PARTEI					1,557	1.0	
Pirates	Jens Golland	1,335	0.9	▼0.6	684	0.4	▼1.0
NPD					606	0.4	▼0.8
FW					531	0.3	▼0.4
DM					430	0.3	
Independent	Christiane Jagau	283	0.2				
BGE					207	0.1	
DiB					197	0.1	
V-Partei³					183	0.1	
Independent	Niels Salveter	162	0.1				
ÖDP					117	0.1	
MLPD					74	0.0	0.0
DKP					31	0.0	
Informal votes		1,567			1,327		
Total valid votes		155,479			155,719		
Turnout		157,046	76.2	▲3.2			
SPD hold	Majority	21,277	13.7	▲4.1			

=== 2013 election ===
Federal election (2013): Salzgitter – Wolfenbüttel
Notes:	Blue background denotes the winner of the electorate vote. Pink background denotes a candidate elected from their party list. Yellow background denotes an electorate win by a list member, or other incumbent. A ✓ or ✗ denotes status of any incumbent, win or lose respectively.						
Party	Candidate	Votes	%	±%	Party votes	%	±%
SPD	✓ Sigmar Gabriel	70,080	46.6	▲1.7	58,881	39.3	▲5.1
CDU	Uwe Lagosky	55,720	37.1	▲4.5	53,593	35.7	▲5.0
Greens	Sascha Pitkamin	6,630	4.4	▼1.4	11,013	7.3	▼1.5
Left	Dorothée Menzner	6,524	4.3	▼3.7	8,461	5.6	▼4.4
AfD	Axel Steinkampf-Sommer	4,548	3.0		5,938	4.0	
Pirates	Arne Hattendorf	2,119	1.4		2,228	1.5	▼0.3
NPD	Adolf Preuß	1,940	1.3	▼0.5	1,796	1.2	▼0.4
FDP	Dirk Michaelis	1,582	1.1	▼5.0	5,142	3.4	▼7.2
Tierschutzpartei					1,286	0.9	0.0
FW	Anke Bastian	1,248	0.8		1,046	0.7	
REP					208	0.1	
PRO					183	0.1	
PBC					167	0.1	
MLPD					39	0.0	0.0
Informal votes		2,208			2,618		
Total valid votes		150,391			149,981		
Turnout		152,599	73.0	▼0.9			
SPD hold	Majority	14,360	9.5	▼2.8			

=== 2009 election ===
Federal election (2009): Salzgitter – Wolfenbüttel
Notes:	Blue background denotes the winner of the electorate vote. Pink background denotes a candidate elected from their party list. Yellow background denotes an electorate win by a list member, or other incumbent. A ✓ or ✗ denotes status of any incumbent, win or lose respectively.						
Party	Candidate	Votes	%	±%	Party votes	%	±%
SPD	✓ Sigmar Gabriel	69,631	44.9	▼7.4	53,144	34.2	▼13.5
CDU	Jochen-Konrad Fromme	50,519	32.6	▼3.1	47,719	30.7	▼0.6
Left	Hermann Fleischer	12,538	8.1	▲4.0	15,569	10.0	▲5.0
FDP	Thomas Keller	9,436	6.1	▲3.5	16,479	10.6	▲3.2
Greens	Jürgen Selke-Witzel	9,032	5.8	▲2.5	13,744	8.8	▲3.4
Pirates					2,812	1.8	
NPD	Friedrich-Werner Schulenburg	2,791	1.8	▲0.2	2,490	1.6	0.0
Tierschutzpartei					1,334	0.9	▲0.2
RRP	Rolf Vorberger	1,163	0.7		1,771	1.1	
ÖDP					129	0.1	
DVU					186	0.1	
MLPD					34	0.0	0.0
Informal votes		2,468			2,167		
Total valid votes		155,110			155,411		
Turnout		157,578	73.9	▼5.6			
SPD hold	Majority	19,112	12.3	▼4.3			

=== 2005 election ===
Federal election (2005):Salzgitter – Wolfenbüttel
Notes:	Blue background denotes the winner of the electorate vote. Pink background denotes a candidate elected from their party list. Yellow background denotes an electorate win by a list member, or other incumbent. A ✓ or ✗ denotes status of any incumbent, win or lose respectively.						
Party	Candidate	Votes	%	±%	Party votes	%	±%
SPD	Sigmar Gabriel	89,068	52.3	▼4.5	81,279	47.7	▼5.3
CDU	Jochen-Konrad Fromme	60,671	35.6	▲1.6	53,365	31.3	▼1.1
Left	Walter Gruber	6,896	4.0	▲3.1	8,596	5.0	▲4.1
Greens	Sven Hagemann	5,718	3.4	▼0.1	9,317	5.5	▲0.2
FDP	Wilhelm Minschke	4,466	2.6	▼2.1	12,572	7.4	▲1.4
NPD	Andreas Molau	2,680	1.6		2,704	1.6	▲1.3
Tierschutzpartei					1,087	0.6	▲0.2
PBC	Michael Müller	787	0.5		528	0.3	▲0.1
GRAUEN					596	0.3	▲0.2
Pro German Center – Pro D-Mark Initiative					59	0.1	
BüSo					70	0.0	0.0
MLPD					75	0.0	
Informal votes		2,918			2,856		
Total valid votes		170,286			170,348		
Turnout		173,204	79.5	▼0.9			
SPD hold	Majority	28,397	16.7				
