= Dunja Kreiser =

German politician

Dunja Kreiser MdB
- Kreiser in 2021

Member of the Bundestag; for Salzgitter – Wolfenbüttel
- Incumbent
- Assumed office 26 October 2021
- Preceded by: Markus Paschke

Member of the Landtag of Lower Saxony; for Wolfenbüttel-Nord
- In office 14 November 2017 – 11 November 2021
- Preceded by: Frank Oesterhelweg
- Succeeded by: Maximilian Schmidt

Personal details
- Born: 27 June 1971 (age 55) Wolfenbüttel, West Germany
- Party: Social Democratic
- Children: 1

Dunja Eleonore Angelika Kreiser (born 27 June 1971) is a German lawyer and politician of the Social Democratic Party (SPD) who has been serving as a member of the Bundestag since 2021.

== Early career ==
Before joining politics, Kreiser worked as a sewage supervisor for the city of Wolfenbüttel. From 1987 to 1990, Kreiser trained as a supply and waste disposal specialist. Kreiser worked as a wastewater master for the city of Wolfenbüttel until 2017 when she was elected in the state election to the Lower Saxony state parliament for the electoral district Wolfenbüttel-Nord.

== Political career ==
Dunja Kreiser stood as a direct candidate in the Salzgitter – Wolfenbüttel constituency in the 2021 federal election and stood in 12th place on the SPD state list. She won her constituency with 38.6% of the first-place votes. She then resigned her seat in the state parliament. Maximilian Schmidt succeeded her in the state parliament.

Kreiser is a full member of the Committee on the Interior and Home Affairs in the Bundestag. She is also a deputy member of the Sports Committee and the Economic Committee.

In addition to her committee assignments, Kreiser chairs the German-Mexican Parliamentary Friendship Group.

== Personal life ==
Kreiser is married and has one child. She is a Protestant.
