= Wilhelm Schmidt (politician, born 1944) =

Member of the Bundestag; for Salzgitter – Wolfenbüttel
- In office 18 February 1987 – 18 October 2005
- Preceded by: Hans-Jürgen Junghans
- Succeeded by: Sigmar Gabriel

Member of the Landtag of Lower Saxony
- In office 21 June 1978 – 20 June 1986
- Constituency: State list

Personal details
- Born: 13 May 1944 (age 82) Lengede, Germany
- Party: Social Democratic
- Children: 2

Wilhelm Schmidt (born 13 May 1944) is a German politician. A member of the Social Democratic Party of Germany, he served in the Landtag of Lower Saxony from 1978 to 1986 and in the Bundestag from 1987 to 2005.

== Later life ==
In early 2021, Schmidt and his wife relocated from Salzgitter to Buxtehude to be closer to their family. Coinciding with the move, he announced his definitive retirement from seeking formal political or organizational offices. He subsequently stepped down from the executive board of the Workers' Welfare Association (AWO) in the summer of 2021, and relinquished his post on the ZDF Television Council the following year.
