= Karl Bielig =

German politician (1898–1991)

Member of the Bundestag; for Gandersheim – Salzgitter
- In office 7 September 1949 – 6 October 1953
- Preceded by: Constituency established
- Succeeded by: Wilhelm Höck

Personal details
- Born: Karl Paul Bielig; 10 October 1898 Meissen, Germany
- Died: 13 June 1991 (aged 92) Bad Homburg, Germany
- Party: Social Democratic

Karl Bielig (10 October 1898 – 13 June 1991) was a German politician of the Social Democratic Party (SPD) and member of the German Bundestag.

== Political career ==
Bielig was a member of the German Bundestag from the first federal elections in 1949 to 1953. In parliament he represented the constituency of Gandersheim–Salzgitter. He was a member of the committee for all-German issues.

== Literature ==
Herbst, Ludolf; Jahn, Bruno (2002). Vierhaus, Rudolf (ed.). Biographisches Handbuch der Mitglieder des Deutschen Bundestages. 1949–2002 [Biographical Handbook of the Members of the German Bundestag. 1949–2002] (in German). München: De Gruyter - De Gruyter Saur. p. 1715. ISBN 978-3-11-184511-1.
