= Lutter am Barenberge (Samtgemeinde) =

- Samtgemeinde
- Interactive map of Lutter am Barenberge
- Location within Germany Location within Lower Saxony
- Coordinates: 51°59′21″N 10°15′47″E
- Country: Germany
- State: Lower Saxony
- District: Goslar
- Disbanded: November 2021
- Subdivisions: 3 municipalities

Area
  - Total: 59.76 km^{2} (23.07 sq mi)
- Elevation: 180 m (590 ft)

Population (2020)
  - Total: 3,968
  - Density: 66.40/km^{2} (172.0/sq mi)
- Time zone: UTC+01:00 (CET)
  - Summer (DST): UTC+02:00 (CEST)
- Postal codes: 38729
- Dialling codes: 05383
- Vehicle registration: GS
- Website: www.sg-lutter.de

Lutter am Barenberge is a former Samtgemeinde ("collective municipality") in the district of Goslar, in Lower Saxony, Germany. It was disbanded in November 2021, and its municipalities were absorbed by the town Langelsheim. It was situated northwest of the Harz, approx. 13 km northwest of Goslar. Its seat was in the town Lutter am Barenberge.

== Geography ==
The Samtgemeinde Lutter am Barenberge consisted of the following municipalities:

- Hahausen
- Lutter am Barenberge
- Wallmoden

== Demographics ==
Population statistics

Year	Inhabitants
1975	4,862
1980	4,727
1985	4,747
1990	4,669

Year	Inhabitants
1995	4,631
2000	4,593
2005	4,451
