= Lutter am Barenberge =

Place in Lower Saxony, Germany

- Ortschaft of Langelsheim
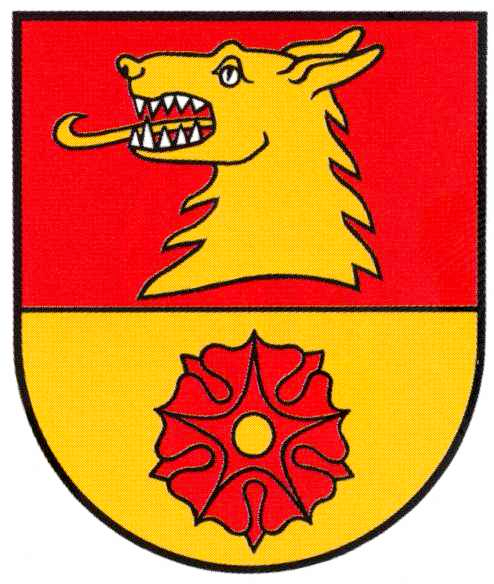
- Coat of arms
- Interactive map of Lutter am Barenberge
- Location within Germany Location within Lower Saxony
- Coordinates: 51°59′24″N 10°16′16″E
- Country: Germany
- State: Lower Saxony
- District: Goslar
- Town: Langelsheim
- Founded: 956
- Subdivisions: 3 districts

Area
  - Total: 33.29 km^{2} (12.85 sq mi)
- Elevation: 165 m (541 ft)

Population (2020)
  - Total: 2,296
  - Density: 68.97/km^{2} (178.6/sq mi)
- Time zone: UTC+01:00 (CET)
  - Summer (DST): UTC+02:00 (CEST)
- Postal codes: 38729
- Dialling codes: 05383
- Vehicle registration: GS
- Website: www.sg-lutter.de

Lutter am Barenberge is a market town (Flecken) and a former municipality in the Goslar district of Lower Saxony, Germany. Since 1 November 2021, it is part of the town Langelsheim, of which it is an Ortschaft. It was the administrative seat of the former Samtgemeinde ("collective municipality") Lutter am Barenberge

== Geography ==
It is situated between the Harz mountain range in the south and the Hainberg hills in the north, approx. 13 km (8 mi) northwest of Goslar. The municipal area comprises the localities of Nauen and Ostlutter.

== History ==
Lutter, named after a nearby creek, was founded by Emperor Otto I in 956 as a part of the Gandersheim Abbey estates within the Duchy of Saxony. A water castle was first mentioned in 1259, leased by the Bishops of Hildesheim to local nobles. In various times, it was claimed by the Dukes of Brunswick-Lüneburg, but re-acquired by the Hildesheim bishops in 1323. Thereupon the denotation Bischofslutter appeared in order to differ it from nearby Königslutter. The name Lutter am Barenberge (i.e. the Harz mountains) is documented since the 14th century.

In the fierce Hildesheim Diocesan Feud of 1523, Lutter was again conquered by Duke Henry V of Brunswick and the Hildesheim prince-bishop John IV of Saxe-Lauenburg could only retain the locality of Ostlutter. During the Thirty Years' War, the Danish troops under King Christian IV retired to Lutter Castle, where they were defeated by Imperial and Catholic forces led by Count Tilly in the 1626 Battle of Lutter, a rout that changed the course of the Thirty Years' War.

According to the Final Act of the Vienna Congress, the former Hildesheim estates of Ostlutter in 1815 passed to the Kingdom of Hanover (Prussian Province of Hanover from 1866), while Lutter proper remained with the Duchy of Brunswick. Both parts were not re-united until an administrative reform of 1941.

=== Demographics ===
As of 30 June 2020 there were 2,296 inhabitants in the municipality Lutter am Barenberge, of which 1,583 in Lutter am Barenberge proper, 313 in Nauen and 400 in Ostlutter.

Population statistics

Year	Inhabitants
1821	1,840
1848	2,557
1871	2,618
1885	2,721
1905	2,558
1925	2,205

Year	Inhabitants
1933	2,245
1939	2,209
1946	3,873
1950	3,795
1956	3,197

Year	Inhabitants
1961	2,956
1968	2,792
1970	2,812
1975	2,681
1980	2,588

Year	Inhabitants
1985	2,584
1990	2,612
1995	2,541
2000	2,529
2005	2,409
