= Frank Oesterhelweg =

German politician

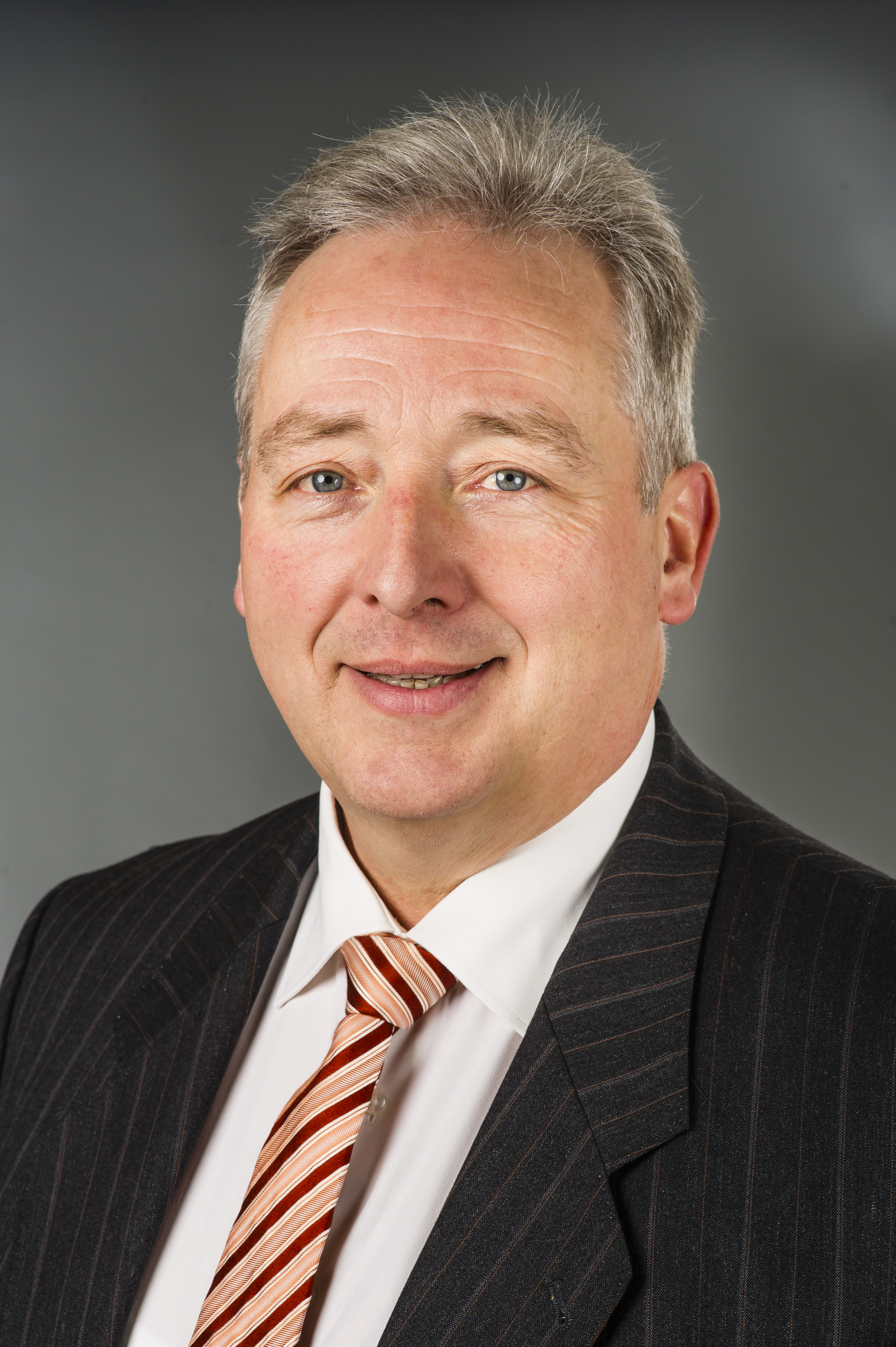
Frank Oesterhelweg (2018)

Frank Oesterhelweg (born 19 November 1961) is a German politician for the Christian Democratic Union of Germany (CDU).

== Life and politics ==
Oesterhelweg was born on 19 November 1961 in Wolfenbüttel and he became a member of the CDU in 1978.

Since 2002, he has been a member of the Landtag of Lower Saxony, the legislative body of the German federal state of Lower Saxony.

Since 2010, Oesterhelweg has been chairman of the regional union of the CDU in Braunschweig.
