= Battle of Łowicz =

War between Polish–Lithuanian Commonwealth and Crimean Khanate

Coordinates: 52°6′N 19°56′E

- Part of the Second Northern War / The Deluge
Date	August 25, 1656
Location	Łowicz, Poland
Result	Polish-Lithuanian victory

Belligerents
Polish–Lithuanian Commonwealth; Crimean Khanate	Swedish Empire

Commanders and leaders
(Polish–Lithuanian Commonwealth) Stefan Czarniecki	(Swedish Empire) Hans Böddeker

Strength
6,000 cavalry (4,000 Poles, 2,000 Tatars)	1,500 cavalry

Casualties and losses
Unknown	1,470 killed

The Battle of Łowicz on August 25, 1656 between forces of the Polish–Lithuanian Commonwealth and Crimean Khanate commanded by Stefan Czarniecki on one side, and on the other Swedish forces commanded by Hans Böddeker. Polish-Tatar forces won the battle.
