= Second Battle of Nanning =

Coordinates: 24°49′0″N 108°19′39″E

- Part of the Central Plains War
Date	August 15 – October 22, 1930
Location	Nanning, Guangxi

Belligerents
Yunnan Army; Supported by: Nationalist government	New Guangxi clique army

Commanders and leaders
Zhang Chong	

The Battle of Nanning was fought between the invading Yunnan Army, allied to Chiang Kai-shek's faction, and the defending forces of the New Guangxi clique.

== Bibliography ==
- 中華民國國防大學編，《中國現代軍事史主要戰役表》
