= Battle of Tarvisio (1943) =

Battle in the Italian campaign

- Part of Operation Achse during the Italian Campaign of World War II
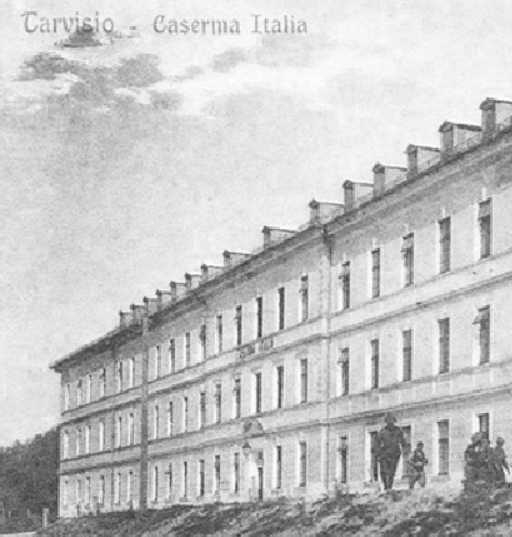
- The "Italia Barrack" (Caserma Italia), where the main exchange of fire in the battle occurred and where most of the active units were located. Members of the Guardia alla Frontiera can be spotted in the image.
Date	9 September 1943 (6 Hours and 15 Minutes)
Location	Tarvisio, Kingdom of Italy
Result	German victory

Belligerents
Germany	Kingdom of Italy

Commanders and leaders
(Nazi Germany) Hans Brand	(Kingdom of Italy) Giovanni Jon (Kingdom of Italy) Bruno Michelotto (Kingdom of Italy) Arnaldo Brasa

Units involved
Waffen SS Karstjäger	Guardia alla Frontiera; XVII° Guardia alla Frontiera

Strength
300 soldiers	200 soldiers

Casualties and losses
80 dead	25 dead 180 wounded

Between the night of 8 September 1943 and 9 September 1943, in the city of Tarvisio, Italy, the members of the XVII° Guardia alla Frontiera guarding the coverage sector, followed the orders of their commanders and attempted to resist the Waffen SS Karstjäger under the command of colonel Hans Brand, in what would be known as the Battle of Tarvisio. It is the first battle ever fought by the Italian resistance against German occupation.

== Background ==
=== Conference of Tarvisio and the Armistice of Cassibile ===
On 6 August 1943, in Tarvisio itself, there was the Conference of Tarvisio, the last documented attempt by the Kingdom of Italy at diplomacy with the Third German Reich. This conference was between the ministers of foreign affairs of both nations, that being Raffaele Guariglia and Joachim Ribbentrop at the time, and additionally the commanders of the Supreme command of both nations at the time, Vittorio Ambrosio and Wilhelm Keitel. The Germans had requested Dino Alfieri to be substituted with Mario Roatta as an ambassador of Italy in Berlin, whilst the Italians had put into question the deployment of the Germans in Northern Italy (questioning why they had been deployed in areas without any active warfare) and the war crimes committed in some areas by German soldiers.

The encounter was pursued in an almost intimidatory and antagonistic manner by the German diplomats, who questioned Italy's allegiance to Germany and questioned Badoglio's officials on whether ongoing negotiations with the Allied Powers had occurred, something the Italians officials had denied, despite it being the case. In fact, the Italians had already began to strengthen contacts with allied intel and governments prior to the conference, and had even told the Allies that the Tarvisio conference with Ribbentrop would have occurred and that it was only a tool as to buy time for Italy. The Armistice of Cassibile would later be signed on 8 September 1943, leading the Germans to operate Operation Achse.

== Battle ==
=== Prelude ===
At 19:00 CET (18:00 GMT) the soldiers in the "Italia barrack" of Tarvisio received the news of the Armistice of Cassibile. Unlike in other areas of Italy, the soldiers within the barrack and in the nearby posts within the city decided to prepare themselves for battle, adhering to the armistice and accepting Nazi Germany as their enemy. The decision was initiated by Giovanni Jon, the local lieutenant colonel, who sounded the alarms within the barracks, and after waiting for every soldier to return to their position, armed and ready, he stated:

Men, for us, the war begins now, and if the Germans attack, we will respond to their weapons with courage and determination. We are the border guards, the advanced sentries of the Fatherland, and we will do our duty.

— Giovanni Jon, "I Sangiorgesi dopo l'8 settembre 1943" - Sempione News

At 22:00 CET (21:00 GMT) there was an attempt to call reinforcements, with Jon trying to contact the XXIV Army Corps, which at the time was located in Udine. The first call for help seems to have occurred only after Giovanni went outside the barrack and spotted numerous German patrols and aufklärungsabteilung nearby. After seeing the situation, Jon was forced to reach out to a local civilian switchboard, due to the fact that the barrack did not possess an independent telephone line, and thus would risk interception. In that civilian switchboard, a woman, Luigia Picech, lent her assistance, having replaced her young sister, Rosa, on duty that day, well aware of the possible risks of her collaboration in this act of defiance. The request thus successfully occurred, however, it was not well received; at first it was plainly rejected, but upon a second attempt, General Licurgo Zannini, head of the XXIV Army Corps, was reported to be sleeping and had thus requested to "not be disturbed" by his subordinates, who, for this reason, rejected the requests by Giovanni to communicate with Licurgo any further. A small Italian anti-parachute platoon was then located at the civilian switchboard, where Luigia keeps on working.

Prior to the battle itself, the Germans were already equipped with superior equipment and could count on reinforcement in the nearby areas to come if the situation had gotten too dire for them unlike the Italians stationed in the barrack.

At 02:00 CET (01:00 AM GMT) of 9 September 1943 there was the very first telephonic ultimatum by Colonel Hans Brand, demanding that the Italians within the barrack lay down their weaponry and surrender to the German forces. Jon refused and told his men to ready for imminent combat. The initial ultimatum highlighted how the Italians only had one hour to decide their next move. By this time the command of the defence of the barrack had been given to Colonel Bruno Michelotto by Jon.

At 03:00 CET (02:00 AM GMT), there was a second ultimatum asking once again for the Italians to surrender, this time with a messenger being sent physically to the location, however, Jon and all of his men refused once again, and instead ordered his men to be ready and told them the battle was about to begin. At that time, Michelotto, in a telegram, specified to other units within the GaF that his men were all ready and full of morale. An illuminating flare could be seen minutes after the refusal, and gunfire started to be shot against Italian positions within the city.

=== Active combat ===
The first casualty of the battle was an Italian soldier of the Guardia alla Frontiera, who, upon saluting the Germans as part of a protocol, was shot. The casualties that followed immediately after were mostly Germans by the hands of the GaF's machine gun and artillery which had been prepared in the previous hours. The Germans responded with their own 20-inch, four-barreled machine guns, prompting Giovanni to ask for reinforcements once again, but to no avail.

More requests of reinforcements were requested, all of them passing through Luigia Picech's public post, which was now being besieged by the Germans. The Germans, seeing no progress in their attacks against the post decided to bring in an anti-tank gun which destroyed the wall of the building and blinded the anti-parachute platoons units stationed there, giving the chance to the SS to kill them. During the battle, Luigia, was injured in the head and in the foot, but continued to pursue her duty, handling the communication lines of the resisting forces within the barrack and at her post, and helping in the battle's effort as much as she could. This forced a still-alive Luigia to drop everything and equip one of the weapons dropped by the fallen soldiers and attempt to fend off the Germans by her own, she would manage to survive but would be unable to continue her job. From that moment onwards, the communication lines of the barrack had been cut off. By this moment onwards, lieutenant colonel Giovanni Jon, captain Bruno Michelotto and lieutenant Arnaldo Brasa were on their own.

After severe German casualties, up to 80 fallen soldiers being recorded, the Italians had run out of ammo and were forced to surrender, raising a white flag from the barrack, and being awarded by the Germans the honours of war, the battle was concluded at 09:15 CET (08:15 GMT).

== Aftermath ==
After the surrender, the entirety of the GAF division involved was explicitly given the choice to either join the Nazi and collaborationist Italian corps or be sent to concentration camps in occupied Poland or Germany. Most of the soldiers and personnel willingly chose to be sent to concentration camps rather than work with the Nazis, and thus, were loaded onto cattle trucks and directed there. Most would face the same fate as most Italian internees, being forced to become forced labourers.

Giovanni Jon was interned in various internment camps including: Cestokowa/Tschenstochau 367, Nurnberg Langwasser 73, Hesepe /308 Lager Fallendo 108. He remained in camps up until 5 April 1945.

Luigia Picech managed to survive the battle, and despite her dire situation, she managed to not be sent to an internment or concentration camp thanks to the help of a family friend, Hans Planger, a trustee of the German Reich, who managed to board her on top of a truck transporting hay and brought her to safety. She would only die in 1981.

== Legacy ==
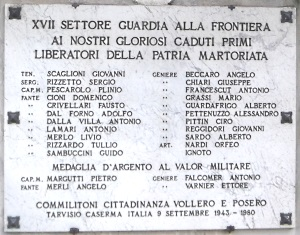
Commemorative plaque for those who have fallen during the Battle of Tarvisio, calling them "liberators of the tortured motherland".

From the 1990s, Italian soldiers that defied Nazi Germany and were sent to internment or concentration camps were recognized by the Italian state and various historical and partisan-affiliated organizations as members of the Italian resistance and victims of Nazi-fascism. This allowed many of the people involved to get badges for their attempts to repel the Germans. Giovanni Jon received an honorary badge, whilst the Silver Medal of Military Valor was granted to Bruno Michelotto.

After his internment, Bruno Michelotto would release a diary in which he would detail parts of the events of the battle, but most importantly his stay in a concentration camp.

Luigia Picech would become the first woman in Italian history to receive the Silver Medal of Military Valor.
