= Sieges of Petra, Lazica =

Three sieges of Petra, Lazica occurred during the Lazic War between the Sasanians and the Byzantines:

- Siege of Petra (541)
- Siege of Petra (549)
- Siege of Petra (550–551)
