= Victor Perli =

German politician

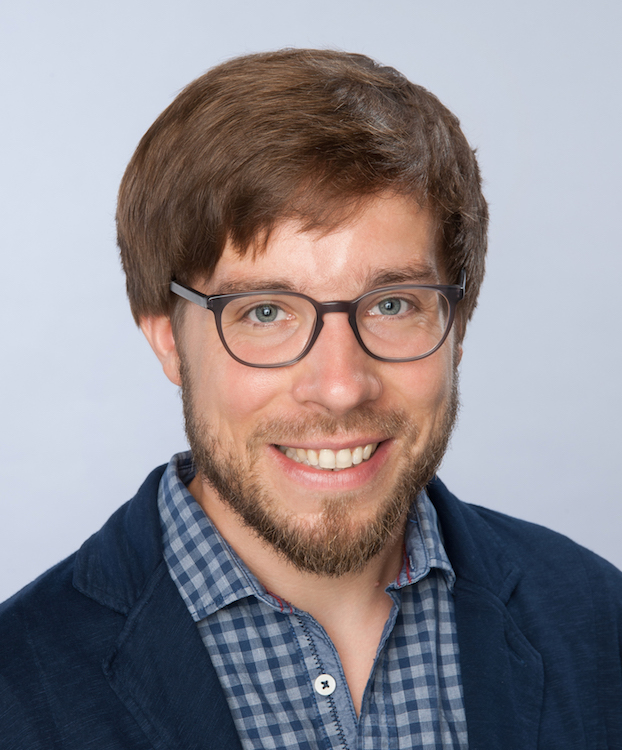
- Perli in 2017

Member of the Bundestag
- Incumbent
- Assumed office 2017

Personal details
- Born: 1 February 1982 (age 44) Bad Oeynhausen, West Germany
- Party: The Left

Victor Perli (born 1 February 1982) is a German politician. Born in Bad Oeynhausen, Lower Saxony, he represents The Left. He has served as a member of the Bundestag from the state of Lower Saxony since 2017.

== Life ==
Perli was born in Bad Oeynhausen as the child of an Italian-Dutch working-class family. The family moved to Wolfenbüttel in 1993, where Perli graduated from the Gymnasium im Schloss in 2001. He then studied political science, sociology and modern history, first at the TU Braunschweig and from 2006 at the University of Potsdam. He completed his studies with the academic degree Magister Artium (M.A.) and subsequently worked as managing director of a family business. He became member of the bundestag after the 2017 German federal election. He is a member of the Budget Committee of Bundestag. In November 2024 Perli announced, that he would not seeking re-election for Bundestag in February 2025.

== Publications ==
- Atommüll - Vom Technik- zum Standortkonflikt?: Konfrontation und Kooperation bei der Endlagersuche. 2017 LIT Verlag ISBN 978-3643137456
