= Battle of Kummuh =

742 BC battle in Syria

The Battle of Kummuh marked the end of the Urartu hold on northern Syria, as Tiglath-pileser III defeated Sarduri II (r. 763–734 B.C.) in 742 B.C.

Tiglath-Pileser III's summary inscriptions indicate that the battle at Kummuh was immediately followed by an Assyrian attack on Urartian territory and a subsequent siege of their capital city.

== History ==
Urartian campaigns in the west solidified their presence in the region for over fifty years. However, their influence began to wane after Tiglath-pileser III (744–727) defeated Sarduri II and his north Syrian and Anatolian allies in a major battle fought in Kummuh (Commagene) in 742. Sarduri II had captured Kummuh somewhere between 746 and 745.

The passage cited above demonstrates the type of control that Urartian kings exerted. They would first attack strategic locations, which would often result in the local ruler surrendering. The ruler would then be reinstated, but would be obliged to provide materials and manpower to the Urartian king as needed. Next, centres along the frontier were detached from the subject territory and integrated into the Urartian state, thereby reducing the subject ruler's power base. The defeated king's treasures were also taken and relocated to Urartian centres. Finally, part of the population would be permanently removed and resettled within Urartu to reinforce the peasantry, armed forces, and garrisons.
