= Battle of Changsha (1911) =

- Part of Xinhai Revolution
Date	October 20, 1911
Location	Changsha, Hunan, China 28°13′41″N 112°56′20″E
Result	Decisive Tongmenghui victory

Belligerents
(Qing dynasty) Qing Empire	Tongmenghui

Commanders and leaders
Unknown	Huang Xing

Strength
40,000 troops	3,000 troops

Casualties and losses
10,000 killed	900 killed

Days after the success of the Wuchang Uprising in October 1911, the Revolutionaries began to spread the revolution to other major cities of China starting from Changsha in Hunan province, not far from Wuhan. The Qing troops were already weakened by their defeat at Wuchang, therefore making the city easy to capture.

On October 22, 1911, the Hunan Tongmenghui members were led by Jiao Dafeng (焦達峰) and Chen Zuoxin (陳作新). They led an armed group consisting partly of revolutionaries from Hongjiang and partly of New Army units in a campaign to extend the uprising into Changsha. They then captured the city and killed the local Qing Imperial general. Then, they announced the establishment of the "Hunan Military Government of the Republic of China" and announced their opposition to the Qing Dynasty and support for a Chinese republic.
