= Philip Matyszak =

British author

Philip L. Matyszak (born 1958) is a British non-fiction author, primarily of historical works relating to ancient Rome.

== Biography ==
Matyszak studied ancient history at Royal Holloway, University of London, graduating with a Bachelor of Arts degree. He then studied Roman history at St John's College, Oxford, graduating with a Doctor of Philosophy degree. His doctoral thesis submitted in 1993, and was titled "Dominance in the Roman senate from Sulla to the Principate".

Matyszak's first career was as a journalist. As well as being a writer, he also teaches ancient history for the Institute of Continuing Education, Cambridge University.

== Published works ==
Chronicle of the Roman Republic	The Rulers of Ancient Rome from Romulus to Augustus	Thames & Hudson (June 2003)
The Enemies of Rome	From Hannibal to Attila the Hun	Thames & Hudson (November 2004)
The Sons of Caesar	Imperial Rome's First Dynasty	Thames & Hudson (June 2006)
Ancient Rome on Five Denarii a Day	Your guide to Sport, Sightseeing & Shopping in Rome, the City of the Caesars	Thames & Hudson (June, 2007)
Ancient Athens on Five Drachmas a Day	Where to eat, drink and meet a philosopher your guide to the cradle of Western culture	Thames & Hudson (September 2008)
Lives of the Romans	(with Joanne Berry)	Thames & Hudson (September 2008)
Mithridates the Great	Rome's Indomitable Enemy	Pen and Sword Books (November 2008)
Legionary	The Roman Soldier's (Unofficial) Manual	Thames & Hudson (27 April 2009)
Roman conquests: Macedonia and Greece	Rome's conquest of Macedonia and Greece	Pen & Sword (November 2009)
The Greek and Roman Myths	A Guide to the Classical Stories	Thames & Hudson (31 August 2010)
Gladiator	The Roman Fighter's (Unofficial) Manual	Thames & Hudson (28 February 2011)
Imperial General	The Remarkable Career of Petilius Cerealis	Pen & Sword Military (11 July 2011)
Expedition to Disaster	The Athenian expedition to Sicily	Pen & Sword Military (30 September 2012)
Sertorius and the Struggle for Spain	Quintus Sertorius and the Sertorian War	Pen & Sword Military (October 2013)
The Gold of Tolosa	A novel set in Rome and Gallic Tolosa in 105 BC	Monashee Mountain Publishing (10 September 2013)
The Roman Empire	Beginner's Guides	Oneworld Publications (3 April 2014)
Cataclysm 90 BC	The Forgotten War That Almost Destroyed Rome	Pen & Sword Military (15 December 2014)
Forgotten Peoples of the Ancient World		Thames & Hudson (2020)
The Blood-Red Sunset	The Lucius Panderius Papers III	Monashee Mountain Publishing (16 October 2020)
A Year in the Life of Ancient Greece	The Real Lives of the People Who Lived There	Michael O'Mara (10 June 2021)
