= George Patrick Welch =

American historian

Colonel George Patrick Welch was an American military officer, historian and writer whose works include Britannia: The Roman Conquest and Occupation of Britain.

== Life ==
He was born in 1900 in Boston, Massachusetts and was educated at Harvard from which he graduated in 1923. For fifteen years thereafter he was active in investment banking, retiring in 1938 to write. In the next few years, he published many short stories and articles, plus a historical novel, Final Hosting. Then came Pearl Harbor and the Army. As a soldier, Colonel Welch served through World War II and for some ten years after in various posts in the United States, the Africa-Middle East Theatre, and Japan.

During the Korean War, he commanded an artillery battalion at the Inchon landing, the assault on Seoul, and the march to the Yalu River. He also served as General Matthew Ridgway's Information Officer. He made headlines in Time magazine in 1952 because of his involvement in exposing information leaks between American and Russian journalists. Some war correspondents, said Welch, had been abusing their rights at Panmunjom by "fraternization and trafficking with the enemy." He said they were guilty of "excessive social consorting, including drinking of alcoholic beverages, with Communist 'journalists.'"

He retired as a full colonel in 1956, he held the Legion of Merit with two oak leaf clusters, the Korean Campaign Medal with four stars, and the Air Medal.

Besides his two books, he also wrote a play, "Assignment in Judea", a fact-based fictional account of the trial and crucifixion of Jesus Christ from the Romans' and Pontius Pilate's perspectives. It premiered in Florida in 1964.

He lived his final years in Colorado Springs, surrounded by his friends in the extensive military complexes headquartered there, including the Air Force Academy, Fort Carson, and NORAD. He died in 1973.
