= Bavares =

Tribe living in Mauretania Caesariensis (between the 3rd to 5th century)

- Ancient Libyan tribe
- Tribes of ancient Kabylia.
- Ethnicity: Ancient Libyans (Berbers)
- Location: Babors
- Language: Old Libyan, African Latin
- Religion: Libyan religion

The Bavares (also Babares or Baveres) were a Berber tribe living in the Roman province of Mauretania Caesariensis between the 3rd and 5th centuries AD. They are known only from inscriptions. They are sometimes portrayed as nomads and other times as sedentary mountaineers. Gabriel Camps argues that the name "Berbers" (Latin barbari) does not derive from "barbarian", as usually thought, but from the name of the Bavares.
